= Catholic Church and abortion =

Stance of the Catholic Church on abortion

The official teachings of the Catechism of the Catholic Church promulgated by Pope John Paul II in 1992 oppose all forms of abortion procedures whose direct purpose is to destroy a zygote, blastocyst, embryo or fetus, since it holds that "human life must be respected and protected absolutely from the moment of conception. From the first moment of his existence, a human being must be recognized as having the rights of a person – among which is the inviolable right of every innocent being to life". However, the Church does recognize as morally legitimate certain acts which indirectly result in the death of the fetus, as when the direct purpose is removal of a cancerous womb. Canon 1397 §2 of the 1983 Code of Canon Law imposes automatic (latae sententiae) excommunication on Latin Catholics who actually procure an abortion, if they fulfill the conditions for being subject to such a sanction. Eastern Catholics are not subject to automatic excommunication, but by canon 1450 of the Code of Canons of the Eastern Churches they are to be excommunicated by decree if found guilty of the same action, and they may be absolved of the sin only by the eparchial bishop. In addition to teaching that abortion is immoral, the Catholic Church also generally makes public statements and takes actions in opposition to its legality.

Many Catholics hold views on abortion that differ from the official position of the Catholic Church. Views range from anti-abortion positions that allow some exceptions to positions that accept the general legality and morality of abortion. There is a correlation between Mass attendance and agreement with the official teaching of the Church on the issue; that is, frequent Mass-goers are far more likely to be anti-abortion, while those who attend less often (or rarely or never) are more likely to be in favor of abortion rights under certain circumstances.

== Early writings ==
According to Respect For Unborn Human Life: The Church's Constant Teaching, a document released by United States Conference of Catholic Bishops Committee on Pro-Life Activities, the Catholic Church has condemned procured abortion as immoral since the 1st century.

John R. Connery writes that early Christian writings rejecting abortion are the Didache, the Epistle of Barnabas, the Apocalypse of Peter, and the works of early writers such as Tertullian, Athenagoras of Athens, Clement of Alexandria and Basil of Caesarea. The earliest Church legislation did not make a distinction between "formed" and "unformed" fetuses, as was done in the Greek Septuagint version of Exodus 21:22-23; this position can be found in the writing of early Church Fathers such as Basil of Caesarea and early Church council canons (Elvira, Ancyra).

In the 4th and 5th centuries, some writers such as Gregory of Nyssa and Maximus the Confessor held that human life already began at conception, others such as Lactantius – following Aristotle's view – spoke rather of the soul that was "infused" in the body after forty days or more, and those such as Jerome and Augustine of Hippo left the mystery of the timing of the infusion to God.

Augustine of Hippo "vigorously condemned the practice of induced abortion" as a crime, in any stage of pregnancy, although he accepted the distinction between "formed" and "unformed" fetuses mentioned in the Septuagint translation of Exodus 21:22-23, and did not classify as murder the abortion of an "unformed" fetus since he thought that it could not be said with certainty whether the fetus had already received a soul. The US Conference of Catholic Bishops considers Augustine's reflections on abortion to be of little value in the present day because of the limitations of the science of embryology at that time.

Later writers such as John Chrysostom and Caesarius of Arles, as well as later Church councils (e.g. Lerida and Braga II), also condemned abortion as "gravely wrong", without making a distinction between "formed" and "unformed" fetuses nor defining precisely in what stage of pregnancy human life began.

Some theologians, such as John Chrysostom and Thomas Sanchez, believed that post-quickening abortion was less sinful than deliberate contraception, and Chrysostom believed that contraception was worse than murder.

As Koblitz writes,

Catholic theologians have long wrestled with the question of whether one can truly be forgiven for a sin that one confesses while either still engaged in the sinful practice or else fully intending to resume the action as soon as absolution has been obtained. When a woman confesses to having had an abortion, she can make a sincere act of contrition if she believes that she will never commit the sin again. "It only happened once" is a frequent (though not necessarily accurate) refrain when an unintended pregnancy occurs. Daily use of contraception, on the other hand, is impossible to rationalize to oneself in this manner, and so it is a sin that, to many Catholics, cannot be satisfactorily expunged.

=== Belief in delayed animation ===
Following Aristotle's view, it was commonly held by such leading Catholic thinkers in early Church history as Jerome and Augustine that a human being did not come into existence as such immediately on conception, but only some weeks later. Abortion was viewed as a sin, but not as murder, until the embryo was animated by a human soul. In On Virginal Conception and Original Sin 7, Anselm of Canterbury (1033–1109) said that "no human intellect accepts the view that an infant has the rational soul from the moment of conception". A few decades after Anselm's death, a Catholic collection of canon law, in the Decretum Gratiani, stated that "he is not a murderer who brings about abortion before the soul is in the body".

Even when Church law, in line with the theory of delayed ensoulment, assigned different penalties to earlier and later abortions, abortion at any stage was considered a grave evil by some commentators. Thus Thomas Aquinas, who accepted the Aristotelian theory that a human soul was infused only after 40 days for a male fetus, 90 days for a female, saw abortion of an unsouled fetus as always unethical, a serious crime, a grave sin, a misdeed and contrary to nature. He wrote: "This sin, although grave and to be reckoned among misdeeds and against nature [...] is something less than homicide [...] nor is such to be judged irregular unless one procures the abortion of an already formed fetus".

=== Juridical consequences ===
Most early penitentials imposed equal penances for abortion whether early-term or late-term, but others distinguished between the two. Later penitentials normally distinguished, imposing heavier penances for late-term abortions. By comparison, anal and oral sex were treated much more harshly, as was intentional homicide.

Although the Decretum Gratiani, which remained the basis of Catholic canon law until replaced by the 1917 Code of Canon Law, distinguished between early-term and late-term abortions, that canonical distinction was abolished for a period of three years by the bull of Pope Sixtus V, Effraenatam, (Note: The relevant part of this constitution is reproduced in Gasparri, Pietro, ed. (1926). "165. Sixtus V, const. Effraenatam, 29 oct. 1588.". Codicis Iuris Canonici Fontes. Vol. I:1-364. (ref. given for the constitution: Bull. Rom., tom. 5, I, p. 25-27). Rome: Typis Polyglottis Vaticanis. pp. 308–311.; also here) of 28 October 1588. This decreed various penalties against perpetrators of all forms of abortion without distinction. Calling abortion murder, it decreed that those who procured the abortion of a fetus, "whether animated or unanimated, formed or unformed" should suffer the same punishments as "true murderers and assassins who have actually and really committed murder". As well as decreeing those punishments for subjects of the Papal States, whose civil ruler he was, Pope Sixtus also inflicted on perpetrators the spiritual punishment of automatic excommunication (section 7). According to Riddle, "The bull had a lifetime of about two-and-a-half years and was weak in influence. The succeeding pope countered it and returned to the traditional position that contraception was a sin and abortion a crime, but that abortion could not occur until after the fortieth day, when the fetus was ensouled".

Sixtus's successor, Pope Gregory XIV, recognizing that the law was not producing the hoped-for effects, withdrew it in 1591 by publishing new regulations in the apostolic constitution Sedes Apostolica (Note: The relevant part of this constitution is reproduced in Gasparri, Pietro, ed. (1926). "173. Gregorius XIV, const. Sedes Apostolica, 31 maii 1591.". Codicis Iuris Canonici Fontes. Vol. I:1-364. (ref. given for the constitution: Bull. Rom., tom. 5, I, p. 275, 276). Rome: Typis Polyglottis Vaticanis. pp. 330–331.) (published on 31 May 1591), limiting the punishments to abortion of a "formed" fetus: "When abortion was neither 'an issue of homicide or of an animate fetus,' Gregory thought it 'more useful' to return to the less-harsh penalties [for early abortion] of the holy canons and profane laws: those who abort an inanimatus [soulless] will not be guilty of true homicide because they have not killed a human being in actuality; clerics involved in abortions will have committed mortal sin but will not incur irregularity". After 1591, Gregory's Sedes apostolica "remained in effect for almost three centuries, being revised only in 1869 by Pius IX".

With his 1869 bull Apostolicae Sedis moderationi, Pope Pius IX rescinded Gregory XIV's not-yet-animated fetus exception with regard to the spiritual penalty of excommunication, declaring that those who procured an effective abortion incurred excommunication reserved to bishops or ordinaries. From then on this penalty was incurred automatically through abortion at any stage of pregnancy.

The 1917 Code of Canon Law codified Pius IX's bull.

=== Discussions about possible justifying circumstances ===
In the Middle Ages, many Church commentators condemned all abortions, but the 14th-century Dominican John of Naples is reported to have been the first to make an explicit statement that if the purpose was to save the mother's life abortion was actually permitted, provided that ensoulment had not been attained. This view met both support and rejection from other theologians. In the 16th century, while Thomas Sanchez accepted it, Antoninus de Corbuba made the distinction that from then on became generally accepted among Catholic theologians, namely that direct killing of the fetus was unacceptable, but that treatment to cure the mother should be given even if it would indirectly result in the death of the fetus.

When, in the 17th century, Francis Torreblanca approved abortions aimed merely at saving a woman's good name, the Holy Office (what is now called the Dicastery for the Doctrine of the Faith), at that time headed by Pope Innocent XI, condemned the proposition that "it is lawful to procure abortion before ensoulment of the fetus lest a girl, detected as pregnant, be killed or defamed".

Although it is sometimes said that 18th-century Alphonsus Liguori argued that because of uncertainty about when the soul entered the fetus, abortion was acceptable in circumstances such as when the mother's life was in danger, he clearly stated that it is never right to take a medicine that of itself is directed to killing a fetus. He also stated that it is lawful (at least according to general theological opinion) to give a mother in extreme illness a medicine whose direct result is to save her life, even when it indirectly results in expulsion of the fetus. (Note: "Question 4. Is it permissible to give a mother in extreme illness medicine to expel a fetus? Reply. Firstly, it is certain that it is not permissible for a mother outside of danger of death to take medicine for expelling even an inanimate fetus, since directly impeding the life of a human being is a grave sin, and a still graver one if the fetus is animate. It is certain, secondly, that it is not permissible for a mother even in danger of death to take medicine for expelling an ensouled fetus directly, since this would be procuring the child's death directly. The question is rather whether it is permissible for a mother to take a medicine absolutely necessary to save her life when it involves danger of expulsion of the fetus. The reply is that, if the fetus is inanimate, the mother may certainly ensure her life, even though, unintentionally on her part, expulsion of the fetus results, an expulsion for which the mother is not responsible, since she is only using her natural right to preserve her life. If the fetus is animate, it is generally held that a mother may take a medicine whose direct purpose is to save her life when nothing else will save it; but it is different in the case of medicines that of themselves are directed to killing a fetus, which it is never permissible to take") While Liguori mentioned the distinction then made between animate and inanimate fetuses, he explained that there was no agreement about when the soul is infused, with many holding that it happens at the moment of conception, and said that the Church kindly followed the 40-day opinion when applying the penalties of irregularity and excommunication only on those who knowingly procured abortion of an animate fetus.

A letter published in The Medical Record in 1895 spoke disapprovingly of the Jesuit priest Augustine Lehmkuhl, who considered craniotomy lawful when used to save the mother's life. The origin of the report was an article in a German medical journal denounced as false in the American Ecclesiastical Review of the same year, which said that while Lehmkuhl had at an earlier stage of discussion admitted doubts and advanced tentative ideas, he had later adopted a view in full accord with the negative decision pronounced in 1884 and 1889 by the Sacred Penitentiary, which in 1869 had refrained from making a pronouncement. According to Mackler, Lehmkuhl had accepted as a defensible theory the licitness of removing even an animated fetus from the womb as not necessarily killing it, but had rejected direct attacks on the fetus such as craniotomy.

Craniotomy was thus prohibited in 1884 and again in 1889. In 1895 the Holy See excluded the inducing of non-viable premature birth and in 1889 established the principle that any direct killing of either fetus or mother is wrong; in 1902 it ruled out the direct removal of an ectopic embryo to save the mother's life, but did not forbid the removal of the infected fallopian tube, thus causing an indirect abortion.(see below).

In 1930 Pope Pius XI ruled out what he called "the direct murder of the innocent" as a means of saving the mother. The Second Vatican Council declared: "Life must be protected with the utmost care from the moment of conception: abortion and infanticide are abominable crimes".

== Church doctrine ==
=== Procured abortion ===
The Catholic Church teaches that procured abortion is a mortal sin against the Fifth Commandment ("Thou shalt not kill"). The church teaches that procured abortion is an intrinsic evil and a crime against human life, dignity, and freedom because it is the murder (direct intentional killing) of a human being (unborn person). The church also teaches that procured abortion cannot be justified, legalized, participated or cooperated in, or procured -- partially or fully -- by any means, for any reason, or under any circumstance. The church further teaches that there is no right to procured abortion. Under the 1983 Code of Canon Law, the law advocates for "crimes against human life, dignity, and freedom." Can. 1397 §2 states: "A person who actually procures an abortion incurs a latae sententiae excommunication". Before the apostolic constitution Pascite gregem Dei, issued by Pope Francis on 1 June 2021, which reforms Book VI of the 1983 Code of Canon Law, the content related to this topic was contained in canon 1398.

=== Unintentional abortion ===
The principle of double effect is frequently cited in relation to abortion. A doctor who believes abortion is always morally wrong may nevertheless remove the uterus or fallopian tubes of a pregnant woman, knowing the procedure will cause the death of the embryo or fetus, in cases in which the woman is certain to die without the procedure (examples cited include aggressive uterine cancer and ectopic pregnancy). In these cases, the intended effect is to save the woman's life, not to terminate the pregnancy, and the death of the embryo or fetus is a side effect. The death of the fetus is an undesirable but unavoidable consequence.

=== Ectopic pregnancy ===
An ectopic pregnancy is one of a few cases where the foreseeable death of an embryo is allowed, since it is categorized as an indirect abortion. This view was also advocated by Pius XII in a 1953 address to the Italian Association of Urology.

Using the Thomistic Principle of Totality (removal of a pathological part to preserve the life of the person) and the Doctrine of Double Effect, the only moral action in an ectopic pregnancy where a woman's life is directly threatened is the removal of the tube containing the human embryo (salpingectomy). The death of the human embryo is unintended although foreseen.

The use of methotrexate and salpingostomy remains controversial in the Catholic medical community, and the Church has not taken an official stance on these interventions. The Catholic Health Association of the United States, which issues guidelines for Catholic hospitals and health systems there, allows both procedures to be used. The argument that these methods amount to an indirect abortion revolves around the idea that the removal of the Fallopian tube or, in the case of methotrexate, the chemical destruction of the trophoblastic cells (those which go on to form the placenta), does not constitute a direct act upon the developing embryo. Individual hospitals and physicians, however, may choose to prohibit these procedures if they personally interpret these acts as a direct abortion. Despite the lack of an official pronouncement by the Church on these treatments, in a 2012 survey of 1,800 Ob/Gyns who work in religious hospitals, only 2.9% of respondents reported feeling constrained in their treatment options by their employers, suggesting that in practice, physicians and healthcare institutions generally choose to treat ectopic pregnancies.

=== Embryos ===
The Church considers the destruction of any embryo to be equivalent to abortion, and thus opposes embryonic stem cell research.

=== Sanctions ===
Catholics who procure a completed abortion are subject to a latae sententiae excommunication. That means that the excommunication is not imposed by an authority or trial (as with a ferendae sententiae penalty); rather, being expressly established by canon law, it is incurred ipso facto when the delict is committed (a latae sententiae penalty). Canon law states that in certain circumstances "the accused is not bound by a latae sententiae penalty"; among the ten circumstances listed are commission of a delict by someone not yet sixteen years old, or by someone who without negligence does not know of the existence of the penalty, or by someone "who was coerced by grave fear, even if only relatively grave, or due to necessity or grave inconvenience".

According to a 2004 memorandum by Joseph Cardinal Ratzinger, Catholic politicians who consistently campaign and vote for permissive abortion laws should be informed by their priest of the Church's teaching and warned to refrain from receiving the Eucharist or risk being denied it until they end such activity. This position is based on Canon 915 of the 1983 Code of Canon Law and has also been supported, in a personal capacity, by Archbishop Raymond Leo Cardinal Burke, the former Prefect of the Apostolic Signatura. Pope Francis reaffirmed this position in March 2013, when he stated that "[people] cannot receive Holy Communion and at the same time act with deeds or words against the commandments, particularly when abortion, euthanasia, and other grave crimes against life and family are encouraged. This responsibility weighs particularly over legislators, heads of governments, and health professionals".

=== Forgiveness of women who abort ===
Apart from indicating in its canon law that automatic excommunication does not apply to women who abort because of grave fear or due to grave inconvenience, the Catholic Church, without making any such distinctions, assures the possibility of forgiveness for women who have had an abortion. Pope John Paul II wrote:

I would now like to say a special word to women who have had an abortion. The Church is aware of the many factors which may have influenced your decision, and she does not doubt that in many cases it was a painful and even shattering decision. The wound in your heart may not yet have healed. Certainly what happened was and remains terribly wrong. But do not give in to discouragement and do not lose hope. Try rather to understand what happened and face it honestly. If you have not already done so, give yourselves over with humility and trust to repentance. The Father of mercies is ready to give you his forgiveness and his peace in the Sacrament of Reconciliation.

On the occasion of the Extraordinary Jubilee of Mercy in 2015, Pope Francis announced that all priests (during the Jubilee year – ending November 20, 2016) will be allowed in the Sacrament of Penance to refrain from enforcing the penalty of excommunication for abortion, which had been reserved to bishops and certain priests who were given such mandate by their bishop. This policy was made permanent by an apostolic letter titled Misericordia et misera (Mercy and Misery), which was issued on November 21, 2016.

=== Recent statements of the Church's position ===
The Church teaches that "human life must be respected and protected absolutely from the moment of conception. From the first moment of his existence, a human being must be recognized as having the rights of a person – among which is the inviolable right of every innocent being to life". This follows from the fact that probabilism may not be used where human life may be at stake; the Catholic Catechism teaches that the embryo must be treated from conception "as" (Latin: tamquam, "as if") a human person.

The New Catholic Encyclopedia concludes:

After a certain stage of intrauterine development it is perfectly evident that fetal life is fully human. Although some might speculate as to when that stage is reached, there is no way of arriving at this knowledge by any known criterion; and as long as it is probable that embryonic life is human from the first moment of its existence, the purposeful termination (is immoral).

Tadeusz Pacholczyk of the National Catholic Bioethics Center writes that the modern Magisterium has carefully avoided confusing "human being" with "human person", and avoids the conclusion that every embryonic human being is a person, which would raise the question of "ensoulment" and immortal destiny.

The Catechism of the Catholic Church says that since the 1st century the Church has affirmed that every procured abortion is a moral evil; the Catechism states that this position "has not changed and remains unchangeable".

The Church teaches that the inalienable right to life of every innocent human being is a constitutive element of a civil society and its legislation. In other words, it is beholden upon society to legally protect the life of the unborn.

Catholic theologians trace Catholic thought on abortion to early Christian teachings such as the Didache, the Epistle of Barnabas and the Apocalypse of Peter. In contrast, Catholic philosophers Daniel Dombrowski and Robert Deltete analyzed Church theological history and the "development of science" in A Brief, Liberal, Catholic Defense of Abortion to argue that a position in favor of abortion rights is "defensibly Catholic".

=== COVID-19 vaccines ===
Due to the anti-abortion stance, some Catholics oppose receiving vaccines derived from fetal cells obtained via abortion. On 21 December 2020, and regarding COVID-19 vaccination, the Congregation for the Doctrine of the Faith emitted a document stating that "it is morally acceptable to receive COVID-19 vaccines that have used cell lines from aborted fetuses in their research and production process" when no alternative vaccine is available, since "the moral duty to avoid such passive material cooperation is not obligatory if there is a grave danger, such as the otherwise uncontainable spread of a serious pathological agent." The document states that receiving the vaccine does not constitute endorsement of the practice of abortion, and that "the morality of vaccination depends not only on the duty to protect one's own health, but also on the duty to pursue the common good." The document cautions further:

Those who, however, for reasons of conscience, refuse vaccines produced with cell lines from aborted fetuses, must do their utmost to avoid, by other prophylactic means and appropriate behavior, becoming vehicles for the transmission of the infectious agent. In particular, they must avoid any risk to the health of those who cannot be vaccinated for medical or other reasons, and who are the most vulnerable.

== Attitudes of Catholic laity ==
Although the church hierarchy campaigns against abortion and its legalization in all circumstances, including threats to a woman's life or health and pregnancy from rape, many Catholics disagree with this position, according to several surveys of Western Catholic views.

=== United States ===
A majority of U.S. Catholics hold views that differ from the official Church doctrine on abortion. This represents a notable shift in Catholic public opinion, with support for abortion rights among Catholics increasing in recent years. According to 2024 Pew Research Center survey data on American's opinions on abortion, a majority of Catholics in the United States (59%) support legal abortion in all or most cases. The support for legal abortion among Catholics is up from 56% in 2020, showing a clear upward trend in Catholic support for legal abortion. This shift among Catholics mirrors a general trend in American society towards increased support for legal abortion. Recent polls also find that the gap between Catholic clergy and laity views further widen among Catholics of color with 73% supporting the right to have an abortion. According to a 1995 survey by Lake Research and Tarrance Group, 64% of U.S. Catholics say they disapprove of the statement that "abortion is morally wrong in every case". According to a 2016 survey by Pew Research Center, 51% of U.S. Catholics say that "having an abortion is morally wrong". Surveys conducted by a number of polling organizations indicate that between 16% and 22% of American Catholic voters agree with Church policy that abortion should be illegal in all cases; the rest of the respondents held positions ranging from support for legal abortions in certain restricted circumstances to an unqualified acceptance of abortion in all cases. According to a 2009 survey by Pew Research Center, 47% of American Catholics believe that abortion should be legal in "all or most cases", while 42% of American Catholics believe that abortion should be illegal in "all or most cases". When posed the binary question of whether abortion was acceptable or unacceptable, rather than a question of whether it should be allowed or not allowed in all or most cases, according to polls conducted in 2006-2008 by Gallup, 40% of American Catholics said it was acceptable, approximately the same percentage as non-Catholics. According to the National Catholic Reporter, some 58% of American Catholic women feel that they do not have to follow the abortion teaching of their bishop.

However, the results in the United States differ significantly when the polls distinguish between practicing and/or churchgoing Catholics and non-practicing Catholics. Those who attend church weekly are more likely to oppose abortion. According to a Marist College Institute for Public Opinion's survey released in 2008, 36% of practising Catholics, defined as those who attend church at least twice a month, consider themselves "pro-choice"; while 65% of non-practicing Catholics considers themselves "pro-choice", According to polls conducted in 2006-2008 by Gallup, 24% of practicing Catholics, defined in this poll as those who attend church "weekly or almost every week", believe abortion is morally acceptable.

It is said that "Latino Catholics" in the United States are more likely to oppose abortion than "White Catholics".

Some reasons for dissenting from the church's position on the legality of abortion, other than finding abortion morally acceptable, include "I am personally opposed to abortion, but I think the Church is concentrating its energies too much on abortion rather than on social action" or "I do not wish to impose my views on others".

According to a poll conducted by Zogby International, 29% of Catholic voters choose their candidate based solely on the candidate's position on abortion; most of these vote for anti-abortion candidates; 44% believe a "good Catholic" cannot vote for a politician who supports abortion rights, while 53% believe one can.

According to 2011 report from Public Religion Research Institute, 68% of American Catholics believe that one can still be a "good Catholic" while disagreeing with the church's position on abortion, approximately as many as members of other religious groups. On this long-standing phenomenon of a number of Catholics disagreeing with the Church's official position on abortion, Pope John Paul II commented: "It is sometimes claimed that dissent from the Magisterium is totally compatible with being a "good Catholic" and poses no obstacle to the reception of the sacraments. This is a grave error". In what the Los Angeles Times called a key admonition, he added: "It has never been easy to accept the Gospel teaching in its entirety, and it never will be". Many, however, suggest that this is the problem, that some of the strongest anti-abortion advocates seem unconcerned about critical social issues in the complete spectrum of the Church's moral teaching. US Cardinal Bernardin and Pope Francis have been prominent proponents of this "seamless garment" approach. The US Bishops have called on Catholics to weigh all the threats to life and human dignity before placing their vote: the tag "intrinsic evil" can lead to an over-simplification of issues. In his column in the Jesuit magazine America, Professor John F. Kavanaugh, S.J., observed:

Most people open to the facts recognize that a human life has begun by the end of the first trimester of a pregnancy. It is at this point that some common ground may be reached to protect unborn human life. There is political will at hand to ensure such protection; but as long as the extreme positions hold sway, no action will be taken.

=== United Kingdom ===
A 2010 poll indicated that one in fourteen British Catholics accept the Church's teaching that abortion should not be allowed in any circumstances. A 2016 poll found that Catholics in Northern Ireland were far more conservative in their views of abortion than people in Britain.

=== Poland ===
In Poland, where 85% of the population is Catholic, a Pew Research poll from 2017 found that 8% of Polish respondents believed abortion should be legal in all cases and 33% that it should be legal in most cases. On the other hand, 38% believed that it should be illegal in most cases and 13% that it should be illegal in all cases.

=== Australia ===
Australia has fully decriminalized abortion in all states except for Western Australia. However, some Catholic individuals who reside in Australia have fought back against this law. In particular, some healthcare professionals who practice Catholicism have refused abortion services to individuals, which has caused an intense divide between "pro-life" and "pro-choice" advocates in the country. Despite that, according to one survey, 72% of Australian Catholics say that the decision to have an abortion "should be left to individual women and their doctors". There is not much discrepancy on the debate of abortion within Australia, and it is mostly held that the majority of individuals do support abortion practices and disregard the beliefs of the Catholic Church in Australia, which states that abortion should be illegal in all healthcare facilities that practice Catholic doctrine.

=== Italy ===
According to the Italian polling organization Eurispes, between 18.6% and 83.2% of Italian Catholics believe abortion is acceptable, depending on the circumstance. The highest number, 83.2%, is in favor of the voluntary termination of pregnancy in case the mother's life is in danger.

== Recent events ==
=== Belgium ===
Prior to 1990, Belgium remained one of the few European countries where abortion was illegal. However, abortions were unofficially permitted (and even reimbursed out of 'sickness funds') as long as they were registered as "curettage". It was estimated that 20,000 abortions were performed each year (in comparison to 100,000 births).

In early 1990, despite the opposition of the Christian parties, a coalition of the Socialist and Liberal parties passed a law to partially liberalize abortion law in Belgium. The Belgian bishops appealed to the population at large with a public statement that expounded their doctrinal and pastoral opposition to the law. They warned Belgian Catholics that anyone who co-operated "effectively and directly" in the procurement of abortions was "excluding themselves from the ecclesiastical community". Motivated by the strong stance of the Belgian bishops, King Baudoin notified the Prime Minister Martens on March 30 that he could not sign the law without violating his conscience as a Catholic. Since the legislation would not have the force of law without the king's signature, his refusal to sign nearly precipitated a constitutional crisis. However, the problem was resolved by an agreement between the king and Prime Minister Martens, by which the Belgian government declared the king unable to govern, assumed his authority and enacted the law, after which the Parliament then voted to reinstate the king on the next day. The Vatican described the king's action as a "noble and courageous choice" dictated by a "very strong moral conscience". Others have suggested that Baudoin's action was "little more than a gesture", since he was reinstated as king just 44 hours after he was removed from power.

=== Brazil ===
In March 2009, Archbishop José Cardoso Sobrinho said that by securing the abortion of a nine-year-old girl who had been raped by her stepfather, her mother and the doctors involved were excommunicated latae sententiae. This statement of the Archbishop drew criticism not only from women's rights groups and the Brazilian government, but also from Archbishop Rino Fisichella, president of the Pontifical Academy for Life, who said it was unjust, and other churchmen. In view of the interpretations that were placed upon Archbishop Fisichella's article, the Congregation for the Doctrine of the Faith issued a clarification reiterating that "the Church's teaching on procured abortion has not changed, nor can it change". The National Conference of Bishops of Brazil declared the Archbishop's statement mistaken, since in accordance with canon law, when she had acted under pressure and in order to save her daughter's life, the girl's mother certainly had not incurred automatic excommunication and there was insufficient evidence for declaring that any of the doctors involved had.

=== England ===
In September 2013, Archbishop Peter Smith, Vice-President of the Catholic Bishops' Conference of England and Wales, decried the decision of the Crown Prosecution Service not to proceed against two doctors who accepted a request to perform an abortion as a means of sex selection, a procedure that is illegal in Britain and that Archbishop Smith described as one expression of what he called the injustice that abortion is to the unwanted child.

=== India ===
Mother Teresa opposed abortion, and in the talk she gave in Norway on being awarded the 1979 Nobel Prize for Peace, she called abortion "the greatest destroyer of peace today". She further stated that, "Any country that accepts abortion is not teaching its people to love but to use violence to get what they want".

=== Ireland ===
In October 2012, Savita Halappanavar died at University Hospital Galway in Ireland, after suffering a miscarriage which led to sepsis (blood poisoning), multiple organ failure, and her death. She was denied abortion under Irish law because the fetus had a heartbeat and nothing could therefore be done. A midwife explained to her, in a remark for which she later apologized: "This is a Catholic country". Widespread protests were subsequently held in Ireland and India, and there was a call to re-examine the Irish abortion laws. On 25 May 2018, the Irish electorate voted by a majority of 66.4% to repeal the 8th Amendment which banned abortion in almost all circumstances, thus allowing the government to legislate for abortion. An exit poll conducted by RTE suggested that almost 70% of those who voted yes considered themselves to be Catholic. New law created by the Irish Parliament allowed for abortion in the first twelve weeks of pregnancy (with an exception to the time limit if the woman's life is at risk). Abortion services commenced on 1 January 2019.

=== Italy ===
Speaking to a group of anti-abortion activists from the Congress of the Movement for Life of Italy, Pope Francis called them Good Samaritans and encouraged them "to protect the most vulnerable people, who have the right to be born into life". He called children a gift, and emphasized the dignity of women. He said they were doing "important work in favor of life from conception until its natural end".

=== Poland ===
It is widely believed that the Catholic Church in Poland is the main source of opposition to the liberalization of abortion laws and the reintroduction of sex education in Polish schools in accordance with European standards. However, research studies have shown that Polish Catholics have a wide range of views on sex and marriage. Many Polish people, including devout Catholics, complain that the Catholic Church makes demands that very few Catholics want and are able to satisfy.

Before the transition to democracy, Poland's government presided over some of the highest abortion rates in Europe, with approximately 1.5 million procedures done per year. Polling in 1991, coming after the collapse of the past communist regime in Poland, found that about 60% of Polish people supported nonrestrictive abortion laws.

That being said, conservative groups remain prominent in Polish politics and often use notions of Polish-Catholic national identity to encourage factionalism and support an agenda that includes weakening democratic institutions like the judiciary and free press as well as supporting restrictions on reproductive decision-making.

=== United States ===
An advocacy organization called Catholics for Choice was founded in 1973 to support the availability of abortion, stating that this position is compatible with Catholic teachings particularly with primacy of conscience and the importance of the laity in shaping church law. In October 1984, CFC (then Catholics for a Free Choice) placed an advertisement, signed by over one hundred prominent Catholics, including nuns, in the New York Times. The advertisement, called A Catholic Statement on Pluralism and Abortion contested statements by the Church hierarchy that all Catholics opposed abortion rights, and said that "direct abortion ... can sometimes be a moral choice". The Vatican initiated disciplinary measures against some of the nuns who signed the statement, sparking controversy among American Catholics, and intra-Catholic conflict on the abortion issue remained news for at least two years in the United States. Bishop Fabian Bruskewitz excommunicated Catholics in his jurisdiction who were associated with this organization in 1996, and the United States Conference of Catholic Bishops stated in 2000 that "[CFC] is not a Catholic organization, does not speak for the Catholic Church, and in fact promotes positions contrary to the teaching of the Church as articulated by the Holy See and the USCCB".

== Political debate over legalization of abortion ==
=== Position of the Church ===
"The moment a positive law deprives a category of human beings of the protection which civil legislation ought to accord them, the state is denying the equality of all before the law. When the state does not place its power at the service of the rights of each citizen, and in particular of the more vulnerable, the very foundations of a state based on law are undermined. ... As a consequence of the respect and protection which must be ensured for the unborn child from the moment of conception, the law must provide appropriate penal sanctions for every deliberate violation of the child's rights."

— Catechism of the Catholic Church

Since the Catholic Church views procured abortion as gravely wrong, it considers it a duty to reduce its acceptance by the public and in civil legislation. While it considers that Catholics should not favour direct abortion in any field, according to Frank K. Flinn, the Church recognizes that Catholics may accept compromises that, while permitting direct abortions, lessen their incidence by, for instance, restricting some forms or enacting remedies against the conditions that give rise to them. Flinn says that support may be given to a political platform that contains a clause in favour of abortion but also elements that will actually reduce the number of abortions, rather than to an anti-abortion platform that will lead to their increase.

In 2004, Joseph Cardinal Ratzinger, then Prefect of the Congregation for the Doctrine of the Faith, declared: "A Catholic would be guilty of formal cooperation in evil, and so unworthy to present himself for holy Communion, if he were to deliberately vote for a candidate precisely because of the candidate's permissive stand on abortion and/or euthanasia. When a Catholic does not share a candidate's stand in favor of abortion and/or euthanasia, but votes for that candidate for other reasons, it is considered remote material cooperation, which can be permitted in the presence of proportionate reasons".

=== Church treatment of politicians who favor abortion rights ===
Many controversies have arisen between the Church and Catholic politicians who support abortion rights. In most cases, Church officials have planned to refuse communion to these politicians. In other cases, officials have quietly urged the politicians themselves to refrain from receiving communion.

== Medical personnel and hospitals ==
Some medical personnel, including many Catholics, have strong moral or religious objections to abortions and do not wish to perform or assist in abortions. The Catholic Church has argued that the "freedom of conscience" rights of such personnel should be legally protected. For example, the United States Conference of Catholic Bishops supports such "freedom of conscience" legislation arguing that all healthcare providers should be free to provide care to patients without violating their "most deeply held moral and religious convictions". The Virginia Catholic Conference expressed support for pharmacists who consider that they cannot in conscience be on duty during a sale of emergency contraception, which they believe is the same as abortion.

In response to such concerns, many states in the U.S. have enacted "freedom of conscience" laws that protect the right of medical personnel to refuse to participate in procedures such as abortion. In 2008, towards the end of the second Bush administration, the U.S. federal government issued a new rule that ensured that healthcare workers would have the right to "refuse to participate in abortions, sterilizations or any federally funded health service or research activity on religious or ethical grounds". The new rule was welcomed by anti-abortion organizations including the Catholic Church; however, abortion rights advocates criticized the new regulation arguing that it would "restrict access not only to abortion but also to contraception, infertility treatment, assisted suicide and stem-cell research". The incoming Obama administration proposed to rescind this rule.

Attempts have been made to oblige Catholic hospitals to accept an obligation to perform emergency abortions in cases where the pregnant woman's life is at risk; however, hospitals that agree to perform abortions in contradiction to Church teaching may lose their official qualification as "Catholic". Church authorities have also admonished Catholic hospitals who, following medical standards, refer patients outside the hospital for abortion or contraception, or who perform tests for fetal deformity.

One Catholic hospital devotes care to helping women who wish to stop an abortion after the process has begun.

In November 2009, when Sister Margaret McBride, as a member of the ethics board of a Catholic hospital, allowed doctors to perform an abortion to save the life of a mother suffering from pulmonary hypertension, Bishop Thomas J. Olmsted determined that she had incurred a latae sententiae excommunication, on the grounds that direct abortion cannot be justified.

As of December 2011, the hospital stated that McBride had reconciled with the Church and is in good standing with her religious institute and the hospital.

== See also ==
- Religion and abortion
- Christianity and abortion
- Catholic moral theology
- Culture war
- Sanctity of life
- Culture of life
