= Excommunication in the Catholic Church =

Catholic practice

In the canon law of the Catholic Church, excommunication (from Latin ex- 'out of' and communio or communicatio 'communion'; literally 'exclusion from communion') is a form of censure. In the formal sense of the term, excommunication includes being barred not only from the sacraments but also from the fellowship of Christian baptism. The principal and severest censure, excommunication presupposes guilt; and being the most serious penalty that the Catholic Church can inflict, it supposes a grave offense. The excommunicated person is considered by Catholic ecclesiastical authority as an exile from the church, for a time at least.

Excommunication is intended to invite the person to change behaviour or attitude, repent, and return to full communion. It is not an "expiatory penalty" designed to make satisfaction for the wrong done, much less a "vindictive penalty" designed solely to punish. Excommunication, which is the gravest penalty of all, is always "medicinal".

Its object and its effect are loss of communion, i.e. of the spiritual benefits shared by all the members of Catholic society; hence, it can affect only those who by baptism have been admitted to that society. There can and do exist other penal measures which entail the loss of certain fixed rights; among them are other censures, e.g. suspension for clerics, and interdict. Excommunication, however, is distinguished from these penalties in that it is the privation of all rights resulting from the social status of the Catholic as such. A person who has been excommunicated is still juridically bound by the precepts of the church, including attending Mass (if one is a Latin-Rite Catholic; in some of the canons of the Eastern Catholic churches, one is barred from attending even divine liturgy). These excommunicated people are to refrain from receiving the Eucharist.

== General concepts ==
In Latin Catholic canon law, excommunication is a rarely applied censure; it is a "medicinal penalty" intended to invite the person to change behaviour or attitude, repent, and return to full communion. It is not an "expiatory penalty" designed to make satisfaction for the wrong done, nor is it "vindictive".

The Catholic Church cannot, nor does it wish to, pose any obstacle to the internal relations of the soul with God; it even implores God to give the grace of repentance to the excommunicated. The rites of the church, nevertheless, are the providential and regular channel through which divine grace is conveyed to Christians; exclusion from such rites, especially from the sacraments, entails the privation of this grace, to whose sources the excommunicated person no longer has access.

Pope Leo X's papal bull Exsurge Domine (May 16, 1520) condemned in its 23rd proposition the view that "excommunications are merely external punishments, nor do they deprive a man of the common spiritual prayers of the Church". Pope Pius VI in Auctorem Fidei (August 28, 1794) condemned the notion which maintained that the effect of excommunication is only exterior because of its own nature it excludes only from exterior communion with the church, as if, said the pope, excommunication were not a spiritual penalty binding in heaven and affecting souls.

== Types of excommunication ==
The terminology used to qualify the modalities of excommunication may vary depending on the author.

The 1913 Catholic Encyclopedia distinguishes excommunication from the refusal of ecclesiastical communion, in which one bishop refuses to worship in common with another.

Anathema is a sort of aggravated excommunication, from which, however, it does not differ essentially, but simply in the matter of special solemnities and outward display.

=== A jure and ab homine ===
Excommunication is either a jure (by law) or ab homine (by judicial act of man, i.e. by a judge). The first is provided by the law itself, which declares that whosoever shall have been guilty of a definite crime will incur the penalty of excommunication. The second is inflicted by an ecclesiastical prelate, either when he issues a serious order under pain of excommunication or imposes this penalty by judicial sentence and after a criminal trial.

=== Latæ sententiæ and ferendæ sententiæ ===
Excommunication is either latæ sententiæ or ferendæ sententiæ.

Latae sententiae excommunication is incurred as soon as the offence is committed and by reason of the offence itself (eo ipso) without intervention of any ecclesiastical judge; it is recognized in the terms used by the legislator, for instance: "the culprit will be excommunicated at once, by the fact itself [statim, ipso facto]".

Ferendae sententiae excommunication is considered by the law as a penalty and is inflicted on the culprit only by a judicial sentence; in other words, the delinquent is rather threatened than visited with the penalty, and incurs it only when the judge has summoned him before his tribunal, declared him guilty, and punished him according to the terms of the law. It is recognized when the law contains these or similar words: "under pain of excommunication"; "the culprit will be excommunicated".

=== Public and occult ===
Excommunication ferendæ sententiæ can be public only, as it must be the object of a declaratory sentence pronounced by a judge; but excommunication latæ sententiæ may be either public or occult.

- An excommunication is public through the publicity of the law when it is imposed and published by ecclesiastical authority; it is public through notoriety of fact when the offence that has incurred it is known to the majority in the locality, as in the case of those who have publicly done violence to clerics, or of the purchasers of church property. This excommunication is valid in the forum externum and consequently in the forum internum.
- Excommunication is occult when the offence entailing it is known to no one or almost no one. This excommunication is valid in the forum internum only.

The practical difference of validities in the forums is very important:

- He who has incurred occult excommunication should treat himself as excommunicated and be absolved as soon as possible, submitting to whatever conditions will be imposed upon him, but this only in the tribunal of conscience; he is not obliged to denounce himself to a judge nor to abstain from external acts connected with the exercise of jurisdiction, and he may ask absolution without making himself known either in confession or to the Sacred Penitentiaria. According to the teaching of Benedict XIV, "a sentence declaratory of the offence is always necessary in the forum externum, since in this tribunal no one is presumed to be excommunicated unless convicted of a crime that entails such a penalty".
- Public excommunication, on the other hand, is removed only by a public absolution; when it is question of simple publicity of fact (see above), the absolution, while not judicial, is nevertheless public, inasmuch as it is given to a known person and appears as an act of the forum externum.

In a case of occult excommunication the culprit has the right to judge himself and to be judged by his confessor according to the exact truth, whereas, in the forum externum the judge decides according to presumptions and proofs. Consequently, in the tribunal of conscience he who is reasonably persuaded of his innocence cannot be compelled to treat himself as excommunicated and to seek absolution; this conviction, however, must be prudently established.

=== Total or partial ===
Salaverri and Nicolau note:

An excommunication [...] can be total or partial according as the excommunicated person is excluded from communion with the faithful in all or only in some of the good which fall under the jurisdiction of the Church.

=== Reserved and non-reserved ===
Excommunication is either reserved or non-reserved. This division affects the absolution from censure. In the forum internum any confessor can absolve from non-reserved excommunications; but excommunications that are reserved can only be remitted, except through indult or delegation, by those to whom the law reserves the absolution.

There is a distinction between excommunications reserved to the pope (these being divided into two classes, according to which they are either specially or simply reserved to him), and those reserved to bishops or ordinaries. As to excommunications ab homine, absolution from them is reserved by law to the judge who has inflicted them. In a certain sense, excommunications may also be reserved in view of the persons who incur them; thus, absolution from excommunications in foro externo incurred by bishops is reserved to the pope; again, custom reserves to him the excommunication of sovereigns.

=== Formal and material ===
There is a difference between formal and material excommunication:

An excommunication is a censure or penalty whereby a delinquent or obstinate person is excluded from the communion of the faithful, until after abandoning his contumacy he is absolved. That can be called formal which affects a man who is really delinquent and obstinate. But that can be said to be merely material, which concerns a subject who through invincible error is thought to be delinquent and obstinate when in reality he is not such.

=== Perfect excommunication ===
An excommunication perfect or a perfect excommunication, is defined as follows:

We call that excommunication perfect whereby the Apostolic See properly intends to separate a delinquent and obstinate person from the body of the Church. Therefore, besides the privation of spiritual goods which fall under the jurisdiction of the Church, a perfect excommunication implies, as its own special nature, this manifest intention of separating someone from the body of the Church. But because the dominant intention of the Church is "to impose an excommunication for healing and not for ruin," therefore, if by his contrition the excommunicated person recovers grace and charity, by that fact his excommunication ceases to be perfect, even though juridically he really remains an excommunicated person to be avoided, and he cannot licitly participate in the communion of the faithful until he is absolved.

=== Membership of the church ===
Salaverri and Nicolau give the following summary of theological opinions on excommunication and membership:

That those who have been excommunicated from the Church by a perfect excommunication are not members of the body of the Church is an opinion common among Catholics.

a) That the Church wishes indeed to punish by excommunication delinquent members, but de facto does not intend to separate the excommunicated from the body of the Church, although she says that they are to be avoided, is held by D'Herbigny, Dieckmann, Spacil, Sauras, with Báñez, Valentia, Suarez and Guamieri [sic, Guarnieri].

b) That those excommunicated with a partial excommunication are members of the Church is a common opinion among Theologians

Salaverri and Nicolau's opinion is that only those which have been excommunicated by a "total, formal and perfect excommunication" can be said to be outside of the Catholic Church.

Catholic priest Joseph Krupp held the opinion that the person excommunicated is still considered Catholic and still has all the duties of that relationship, including going to Mass and the like. These persons are, however, to refrain from receiving Communion.

Edward N. Peters states:

Because excommunication can be imposed only on a Catholic (that is, one who is in full communion with the Church according to canon 205 [of the 1983 Code of Canon Law]), excommunication deprives one of the fullness of the communion that he or she previously enjoyed. [...] Excommunication does not mean that one is no longer a Christian (because Christian baptism imprints an indelible character on the soul) or no longer a Catholic (for although there are ways to renounce one's Catholic identity, excommunication is not one of them). It does mean, though, that one is deprived of the benefits of full communion with the Catholic Church.

Bishop Thomas Paprocki holds a similar view as that of Krupp and Peters.

However, this opinion is at odds with the Ecumenical Council of Council of Trent, which decree, according to the orthodox Catholic understanding, is considered infallible: "excommunicated persons are not members of the Church, because they have been cut off by her sentence from the number of her children and belong not to her communion until they repent".

== History ==
The Catholic Church claims that the penalty of excommunication is biblical and that both Paul of Tarsus and John the Apostle make reference to the practice of cutting people off from the community, in order to hasten their repentance. The Catholic Encyclopedia states that from the earliest days of Christianity, excommunication was the chief (if not the only) ecclesiastical penalty for laymen; for guilty clerics the first punishment was deposition from their office, i.e. reduction to the ranks of the laity. The Catholic Encyclopedia adds that during the first centuries of Christianity, excommunication was not regarded as a simple external measure, but also as one which touched the soul and the conscience. It was not merely the severing of the outward bond which holds individual to their place in the church; it severed also the internal bond, and the sentence pronounced on earth was understood to be ratified in heaven.

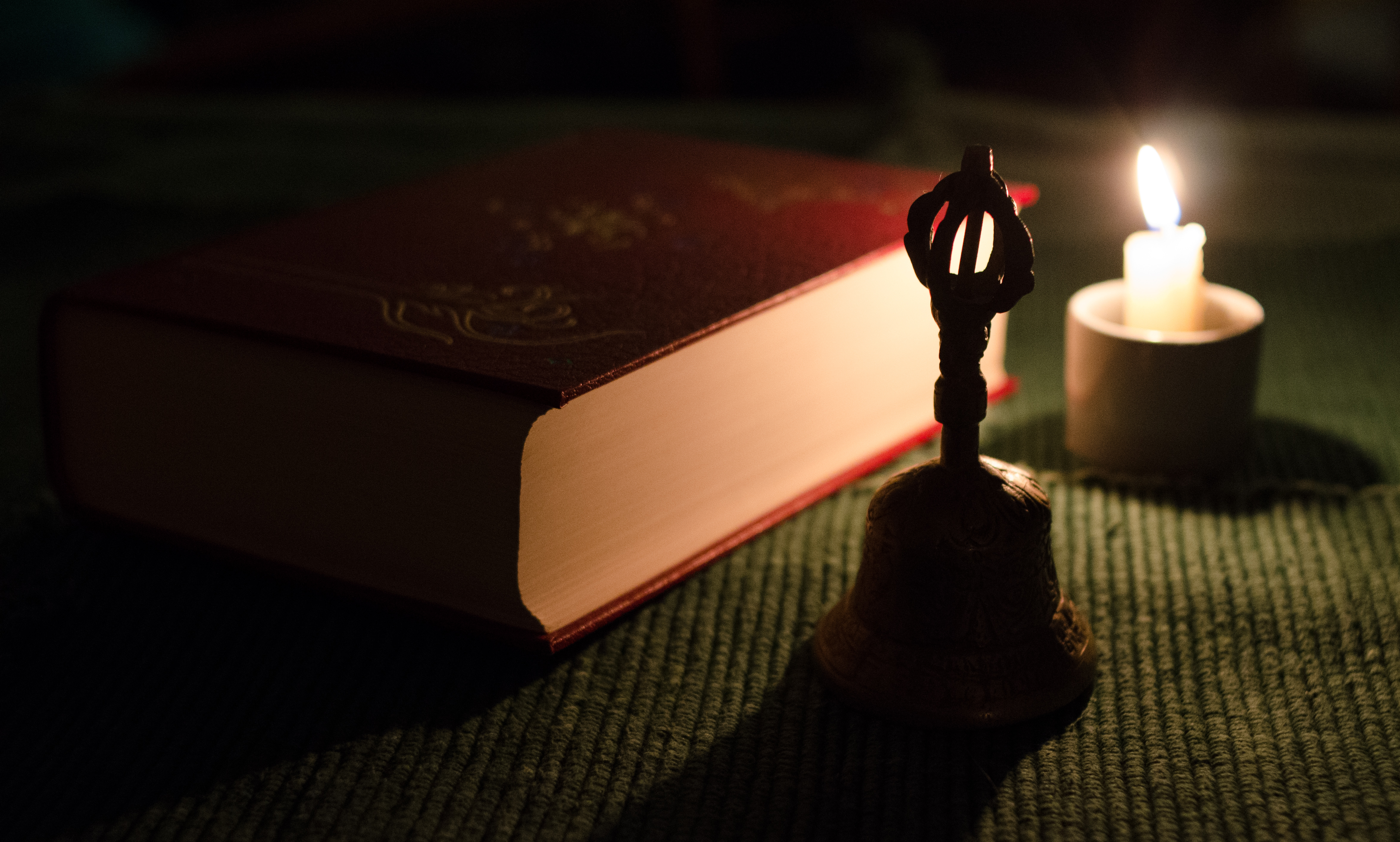
In some cases, excommunication would be announced with a ceremony involving a bell, book, and candle.

During the Middle Ages, excommunication was analogous to the secular imperial ban or "outlawry" under common law. The individual was separated to some degree from the communion of the faithful. Formal acts of public excommunication were sometimes accompanied by a ceremony wherein a bell was tolled (as for the dead), the Book of the Gospels was closed, and a candle snuffed out—hence the idiom "to condemn with bell, book, and candle."

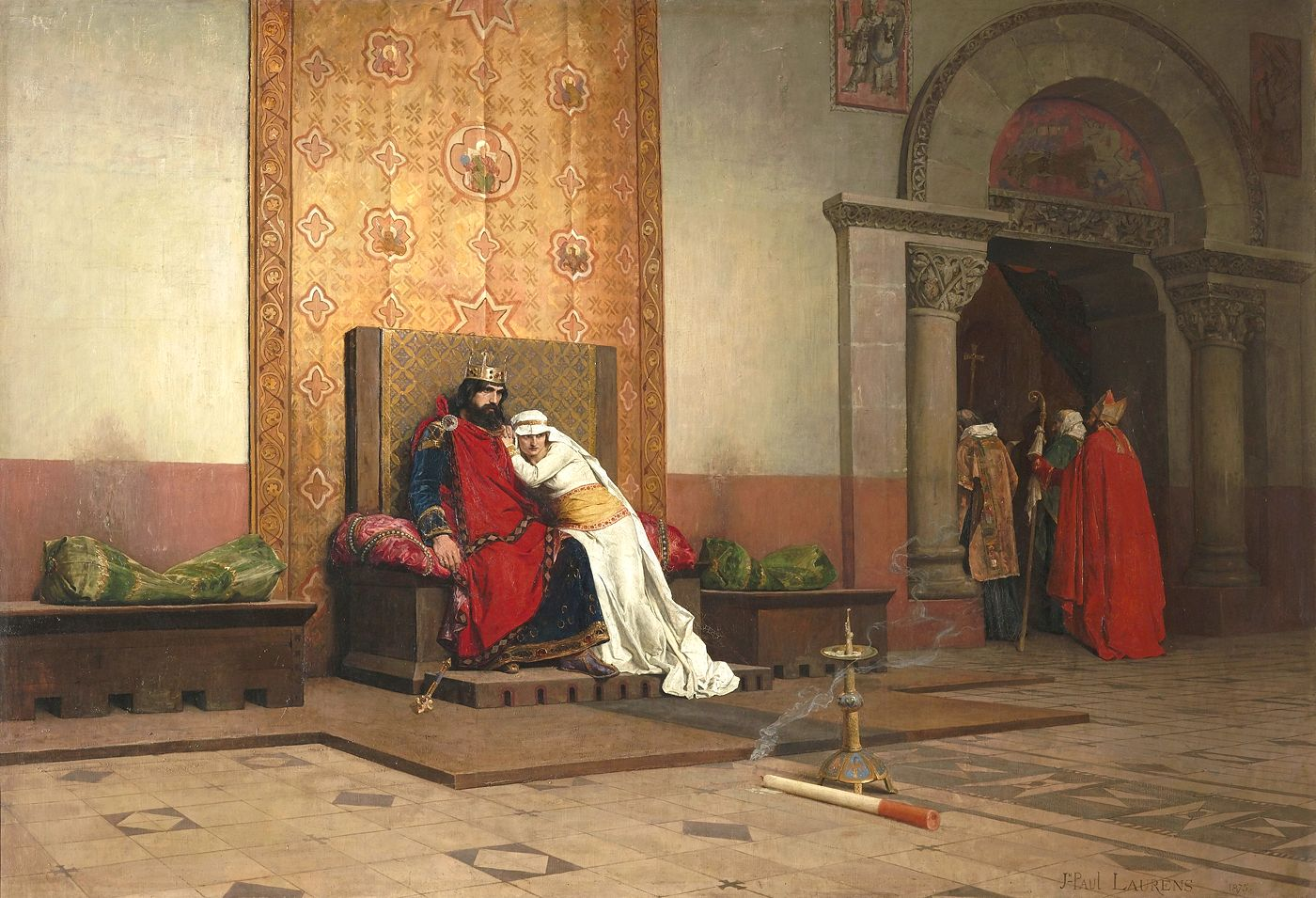
The Excommunication of Robert the Pious (1875) by Jean-Paul Laurens. Robert was able to get his excommunication reversed following the election of the next pope.

Those under excommunication were to be shunned. Pope Gregory VII was the first to mitigate the proscription against communicating with an excommunicated person. At a council in Rome in 1079, he made exceptions for members of the immediate family, servants, and occasions of necessity or utility. In the mid-12th century, Pope Eugene III held a synod in order to deal with the large number of heretical groups. Mass excommunication was used as a convenient tool to squelch heretics who belonged to groups which professed beliefs radically different than those taught by the Catholic Church.

William the Conqueror separated ecclesiastical cases from the Hundred courts, but allowed the bishops to seek assistance from the secular authorities. Excommunications were intended to be remedial and compel the offender to return to the fold. The practice in Normandy provided that if an obdurate excommunicate remained so for a year and a day, his goods were subject to confiscation at the duke's pleasure. Later, bishops were authorized to submit a writ to have the individual imprisoned. On the other hand, the bishops held temporalities which the king could seize if the bishop refused to absolve an imprisoned excommunicate. The authority of a bishop to excommunicate someone was restricted to those persons who resided in his see. This often gave rise to jurisdictional disputes on the part of abbeys which claimed to be exempt.

In 1215, the Fourth Council of the Lateran decreed that excommunication may be imposed only after warning in the presence of suitable witnesses and for manifest and reasonable cause; and that they are to be neither imposed nor lifted for payment. In practice, excommunications with subsequent writs appear to have been used to enforce clerical discipline and functioned something like a citation for "contempt of court". By the fourteenth century, bishops were resorting to excommunication against those who defaulted in making payment of the clerical subsidy demanded by the king of England for his wars against France.

The Council of Trent held that "excommunicated persons are not members of the Church, because they have been cut off by her sentence from the number of her children and belong not to her communion until they repent".

=== In Coena Domini ===
In Coena Domini was a recurrent papal bull between 1363 and 1770, formerly issued annually in Rome on Holy Thursday (in Holy Week), or later on Easter Monday. It included proscriptions against apostasy, heresy and schism, the falsification of apostolic briefs and papal bulls, violence done to cardinals, papal legates, nuncios; against piracy, against appropriating shipwrecked goods, and against supplying Saracens and Turks with war material. The custom of periodical publication of censures was an old one. The tenth canon of the Council of York (1195) ordered all priests to publish censures of excommunication against perjurers with bell and lighted candle thrice in the year. The Council of London in 1200 commanded the yearly publication of excommunication against sorcerers, perjurers, incendiaries, thieves and those guilty of rape.

From the middle of the fifteenth century, dueling over questions of honor increased so greatly, that in 1551 the Council of Trent was obliged to enact the severest penalties against it. The malice of the duel lies in the fact that it makes right depend upon the fate of arms. Dueling was forbidden; and the prohibition extended to not only the principals, but their seconds, physicians expressly brought to attend upon the scene, and all spectators not accidentally present. The excommunication was incurred, not only when the parties actually fought, but as soon as they proposed or accepted a challenge. According to the council, those who took part in a duel were ipso facto excommunicated, and if they were killed in the duel they were to be deprived of Christian burial. These ecclesiastical penalties were at a later date repeatedly renewed and even in parts made more severe. Benedict XIV decreed that duelists should be denied burial by the church even if they did not die on the dueling ground and had received absolution before death. It pronounced the severest ecclesiastical penalties against those princes who should permit dueling between Christians in their territories.

=== Political aspects ===
When King John of England refused to accept Stephen Langton as Archbishop of Canterbury, he seized the lands of the archbishopric and other papal possessions. Pope Innocent III first sent a commission to negotiate with the king, and when that failed, place the kingdom under interdict. This prohibited the clergy from conducting religious services, with the exception of baptisms for the young, and last rites for the dying. King John responded by taking more church lands and their revenues. Innocent threatened the king with excommunication and in 1209 proceeded to excommunicate the King.

=== Abuses ===
The extension of the use of excommunication led to abuses. The penalty is designed to bring the sinner back to repentance. However, it could be abused, used as a political tool and even employed for the purposes of revenge—abuses of canon law. In 1304, John Dalderby, Bishop of Lincoln, excommunicated all those persons of Newport Pagnell who knew the whereabouts of Sir Gerald Salvayn's wayward falcon and failed to return it.

=== Major and minor excommunication ===
Until the second half of the 19th century, excommunication was of two kinds, major and minor:

- Minor excommunication does not exist anymore. A minor excommunication is uniformly defined by canonists and by Gregory IX as prohibition from receiving the sacraments, what theologians call the passive use of the sacraments. In order to receive the Eucharist and the other sacraments, those who had incurred this penalty had to be absolved therefrom; as it was not reserved, this could be done by any confessor. Indirectly, however, it entailed other consequences. The canon law taught that the priest who celebrates Mass while under the ban of minor excommunication sins grievously; also that he sins similarly in administering the sacraments; and finally, that while he can vote for others, he himself is ineligible to a canonical office. This is readily understood when we remember that the cleric thus excommunicated was presumed to be in the state of grievous sin, and that such a state is an obstacle to the lawful celebration of Mass and the administration of the sacraments.
- Major excommunication, which remains now the only kind in force.

Minor excommunication was really identical with the state of the penitent of olden times who, prior to his reconciliation, was admitted to public penance. Minor excommunication was incurred by unlawful intercourse with the excommunicated, and in the beginning no exception was made of any class of excommunicated persons. Owing, however, to many inconveniences arising from this condition of things, especially after excommunications had become so numerous, Martin V, by the constitution Ad evitanda (1418), restricted the aforesaid unlawful intercourse to that held with those who were formally named as persons to be shunned and who were therefore known as vitandi (Latin vitare, to avoid), also with those who were notoriously guilty of striking a cleric.

But as the twofold category of minor and major excommunication was in modern times greatly reduced, little attention was paid to minor excommunication, and eventually it ceased to exist after the publication of the constitution Apostolicæ Sedis. The latter was silent concerning minor excommunication (by its nature an excommunication latæ sententiæ of a special kind); therefore, canonists concluded that minor excommunication no longer existed. This conclusion was formally ratified by the Holy Office (6 Jan., 1884, ad 4).

=== Number of latae sententiae excommunications ===
Over time, the number of hypothetical situations envisioned by the moralists and canonists as ipso facto bringing about excommunication latae sententiae, had increased by a lot; Lucius Ferraris (18th century) numbers almost 200 of those possible situations. The principal ones were destined to protect the Catholic faith, the ecclesiastical hierarchy and its jurisdiction, and figured in the bull In Coena Domini read publicly each year in Rome, on Holy Thursday.

==== Apostolicae Sedis ====
In the preamble of the 1869 apostolic constitution Apostolicae Sedis, Pius IX stated that during the course of centuries, the number of censures latae sententiae had increased inordinately, that some of them were no longer expedient, that many were doubtful, that they occasioned frequent difficulties of conscience, and finally, that a reform was necessary. Apostolicae Sedis was a issued by Pope Pius IX on 12 October 1869. It revised the list of censures that in canon law were imposed automatically (latae sententiae) on offenders. It also reduced their number and clarified those preserved: all excommunications latæ sententiæ that Apostolicae Sedis did not mention were abolished. The document also detailed which excommunications where reserved and to whom.

In the 19th century, there are four more excommunications latæ sententiæ which were declared after the publication of Apostolicae Sedis moderationi:

1. In 1872, a latae sententiae excommunication, non-reserved, was declared against missionaries, both regulars and seculars, of the East Indies or the West Indies who devote themselves to commerce or who participate in it, and their immediate superiors, provincial or general, who fail to punish the culprits, at least by removal, and even after a single offense. This excommunication comes down from the Constitutions of Urban VIII, "Ex delicto" (February 22, 1633), and Clement IX, "Sollicitudo" (July 17, 1669), but was suppressed by reason of non-mention in the apostolic constitution Apostolicae Sedis; it was reestablished, however, at the request of the S. Cong. of the Inquisition, on December 4, 1872. This excommunication is non-reserved, but the culprit cannot be absolved prior to making restitution, unless he be at the point of death.
2. The Constitution "Romanus Pontifex" (August 28, 1873), besides other penalties, declares excommunication latae senentiae reserved to the pope: 1) first, against the dignitaries and canons of cathedral churches (or those having the administration of vacant cathedrals) who would dare to concede and transfer the administration of their church with the title of vicar to the person elected by the chapter, or named or presented to said church by lay power; 2) second, against those so elected or presented; 3) and third, against all who aid, advise, or countenance the aforesaid offenders.
3. Excommunication latae sententiae reserved to the pope against the members of the "Catholic Italian Society for the restoration of the rights of the Christian and especially of the Roman people", and against its promoters, supporters, and adherents (S. Peniten., August 4, 1876; Acta S. Sed., IX, 352). Amongst other rights this society proposed to restore popular participation in the election of the sovereign pontiff.
4. In 1893, a latae sententiae excommunication reserved to the ordinary was pronounced: it was against laymen (for ecclesiastics the penalty is suspension) who traffic in Mass-stipends and trade them with priests for books and other merchandise (S. Cong. of the Council, decree "Vigilanti studio", May 25, 1893).

=== 20th century ===
The early 20th century Catholic Encyclopedia notes that "[i]n recent times" the number of excommunications in force was greatly diminished, that a new method of absolving from them has been inaugurated, and that that thus, without change of nature, excommunication has become an exceptional penalty, reserved for very grievous offenses detrimental to Christian society.

The 1917 Code of Canon Law entered into force in 1918.

In 1975, priest Louis de Naurois referred to that excommunication as "the gravest penalty of all and the most frequent", and added that excommunication "is always medicinal".

==== Vitandi and tolerati ====
Since 1418, the Catholic Church formally differentiated between excommunicated persons tolerati ("tolerated") and those vitandi ("to be avoided"), when Pope Martin V clearly drew this distinction in his apostolic constitution Ad evitanda scandala.

This distinction "was still found in canon law as late as the early 20th century, but it has been dropped from current law as being unworkable given the way modern societies are set up".

==== Reforms of John Paul II ====
The 1983 Code of Canon Law entered into force in 1983. The Code of Canons of the Eastern Churches entered into force in 1991.

== Excommunicable offenses ==
In the Latin Church, canon law describes two forms of excommunication. The first is ferendae sententiae. This is where the person excommunicated is subject to a canonical process or trial, and if found guilty of misdemeanours meriting excommunication is duly sentenced. Once the sentence is published, that person is barred from active participation as a member of the Catholic Church. But this is a rare event.

The more common excommunication is that termed latae sententiae, or what sometimes called often "automatic excommunication", where someone, in committing a certain act, incurs the penalty without any canonical process having to take place. If the law or precept expressly establishes it, however, a penalty is latae sententiae, so that it is incurred ipso facto when the delict is committed (can. 1314).

=== Ferendae sententiae ===
A person may be ferendae sententiae (i.e., upon judicial review) excommunicated if the person

1. tries to celebrate the Mass without being a priest (incurs, for Latin Catholics, also a latae sententiae interdict for laymen and suspension for clerics, can. 1378 § 2 no. 1, 1983 CIC; can. 1443 CCEO);
2. hears a Confession or tries to absolve without being able to absolve (for Latin Catholics; this does not, of course, include hindrances on the penitent's side for the mere hearing of the Confessions, and hidden hindrances on the penitent's side for absolutions; can. 1378 § 2 no. 1, 1983 CIC; incurs also a latae sententiae interdict for laymen and suspension for clerics);
3. breaks the Seal of the Confessional indirectly or as someone not the Confessor, e.g. an interpreter or one who overheard something that was said (for Latin Catholics, can. 1388 § 2 1983 CIC);
4. who breaks a penal law allowing excommunication that was enacted on local level, which the local authority, however, may only do with great caution and for grave offences (for Latin Catholics, can. 1318, 1983 CIC);
5. omits stubbornly, as an Eastern Catholic priest, the commemoration of the hierarch in the Divine Liturgy and Divine Praises (not mandatorily, can. 1438 CCEO);
6. commits physical violence against a patriarch or a metropolitan, as an Eastern Catholic (can. 1445 § 1 CCEO);
7. incites sedition against any hierarch, especially a patriarch or the Pope, as an Eastern Catholic (can. 1447 § 1, 1983 CIC, not mandatorily);
8. commits murder, as an Eastern Catholic (can. 1450 § 1 CCEO);
9. kidnaps, wounds seriously, mutilates or tortures (physically or mentally) a person, as an Eastern Catholic (can. 1451 CCEO, not mandatorily);
10. falsely accuses someone of a [canonical] offense, as an Eastern Catholic (can. 1454 CCEO, not mandatorily);
11. tries to use the influence of secular authority to gain admission to Holy Orders or any function in the church, as an Eastern Catholic (can. 1460 CCEO, not mandatorily);
12. administers or receives a Sacrament, excluding Holy Orders, or any function in the Church through simony, as an Eastern Catholic (can. 1461 CCEO, not mandatorily).

=== Latae sententiae ===
The 1983 Code of Canon Law attaches the penalty of latae sententiae (automatic) excommunication to the following actions:

1. Apostasy, heresy, and schism (can. 1364)
2. Desecration of the Eucharist (can. 1382 § 1)
3. A person who physically attacks the pope (can. 1370)
4. A priest who in confession absolves a partner with whom they have violated the sixth commandment [offenses against chastity] (can. 977, can. 1384)
5. A person who attempts to confer a holy order on a woman, and the woman who attempts to receive it (can. 1379) (Note: Revised and promulgated by Pope Francis on 1 June 2021; took effect on 8 Dec. 2021.)
6. A bishop who consecrates another bishop without papal mandate (can. 1387)
7. A priest who violates the seal of the confessional (can. 1386)
8. A person who procures an abortion (can. 1397 §2)
9. Accomplices who were needed to commit an action that has an automatic excommunication penalty (can. 1329)

== Those who can excommunicate ==
Excommunication is either a jure (by law) or ab homine (by judicial act of man, i.e. by a judge). The first is provided by the law itself, which declares that whosoever shall have been guilty of a definite crime will incur the penalty of excommunication. The second is inflicted by an ecclesiastical prelate, either when he issues a serious order under pain of excommunication or imposes this penalty by judicial sentence and after a trial.

Excommunication is an act of ecclesiastical jurisdiction, the rules of which it follows. Hence the general principle: whoever has proper jurisdiction can excommunicate, but only his own subjects. Therefore, whether excommunications be a jure (by the law) or ab homine (under form of sentence or precept), they may come from the pope, from the bishop for his diocese; and from regular prelates for religious orders. But a parish priest cannot inflict this penalty. The subjects of these various authorities are those who come under their jurisdiction chiefly on account of domicile or quasi-domicile in their territory; then by reason of the offense committed while on such territory; and finally by reason of personal right, as in the case of regulars. As to excommunications ab homine, absolution from them is reserved by law to the ordinary who has imposed them.

== Those who can be excommunicated ==
No one can be subject to ecclesiastical censure unless they are baptized, delinquent, and contumacious. Baptism confers initial jurisdiction, delinquency refers to having committed a wrong, and contumacious indicates the person's willful persistence in such conduct. Since excommunication is the forfeiture of the spiritual privileges of ecclesiastical society, all those, but those only, can be excommunicated who, by any right whatsoever, belong to this society. Consequently, excommunication can be inflicted only on baptized and living Catholics. It does not pertain to pagans, Muslims, Jews, and other non-Catholics.

No one is automatically excommunicated for any offense if, without any fault of his own, he was unaware that he was violating a law (1983 CIC 1323 n. 2) or that a penalty was attached to the law (1983 CIC 1324 §1 n. 9). The same applies if one was a minor, had the imperfect use of reason, was forced through grave or relatively grave fear, was forced through serious inconvenience, or in certain other circumstances (1983 CIC 1324).

== Absolution from excommunication ==
Apart from the rare cases in which excommunication is imposed for a fixed period and then ceases of itself, it is always removed by absolution. Though the same word is used to designate the sacramental sentence by which sins are remitted and that by which excommunication is removed; there is a vast difference between the two acts. The absolution which revokes excommunication is purely jurisdictional and has nothing sacramental about it. It reinstates the repentant sinner in the church; restores the rights of which he had been deprived, beginning with participation in the sacraments; and for this very reason, it should precede sacramental absolution, which it thenceforth renders possible and efficacious. After absolution from excommunication has been given, the judge sends the person absolved to a confessor, that his sin may be remitted; when absolution from censure is given in the confessional, it should always precede sacramental absolution, conformably to the instruction in the Ritual and the very tenor of the formula for sacramental absolution.

It may be noted at once that the principal effect of absolution from excommunication may be acquired without the excommunicated person's being wholly reinstated in his former position. Thus, an ecclesiastic might not necessarily recover the benefice which he had lost; indeed he might be admitted to lay communion only. Ecclesiastical authority has the right to posit certain conditions for the return of the culprit, and every absolution from excommunication calls for the fulfillment of certain conditions which vary in severity, according to the case.

The formula of absolution from excommunication is not strictly determined, and, since it is an act of jurisdiction, it suffices if the formula employed express clearly the effect which it is desired to attain. The sacramental form of absolution from sins is not to be changed, when a priest, in keeping with the provision of law, absolves a properly disposed penitent from a censure latae sententiae in the sacrament of confession. It is enough that he intend also to absolve from censures. Before absolving from sins, however, the confessor may absolve from the censure, using the formula for absolution from censure outside the sacrament of penance.

An excommunicated person is prohibited from receiving the sacraments, but if he receives them in violation of the law, the sacraments are valid. If for any reason the absolution from the censure is invalid, or is not given at all, nevertheless, provided the penitent is rightly disposed, his sins will always be forgiven in the sacrament of confession.

=== Those who can absolve from excommunication ===
The answer is given in the customary rules of jurisdiction. The right to absolve belongs to him who can excommunicate and who has imposed the law, moreover to any person delegated by him to this effect, since this power, being jurisdictional, can be delegated. First, we must distinguish between excommunication ab homine, which is judicial, and excommunication a jure, i.e. latae sententiae. For the former, absolution is given by the judge who inflicted the penalty (or by his successor), in other words by the pope, or the bishop (ordinary), also by the superior of said judge when acting as judge of appeal.

As to excommunication latae sententiae, the power to absolve is either ordinary or delegated. Ordinary power is determined by the law itself, which indicates to what authority the censure is reserved in each case. Delegated power is of two kinds: that granted in permanency and set down in the law and that granted or communicated by personal act, e.g. by authority (faculties) of the Roman Penitentiaria, by episcopal delegation for special cases, or bestowed upon certain priests.

Unless the canon reserves removal of the penalty to the Holy See, the local ordinary can remit the excommunication, or he can delegate that authority to the priests of his diocese (which most bishops do in the case of abortion).

== Absolution reserved to the Apostolic See today ==
The 1983 Code of Canon Law, as amended in 2021 by Pascite gregem Dei, states:

1. "A person who uses physical force against the Roman Pontiff incurs a latae sententiae excommunication reserved to the Apostolic See; if the offender is a cleric, another penalty, not excluding dismissal from the clerical state, may be added according to the gravity of the crime." (can. 1370)
2. "Both a person who attempts to confer a sacred order on a woman, and the woman who attempts to receive the sacred order, incur a latae sententiae excommunication reserved to the Apostolic See; a cleric, moreover, may be punished by dismissal from the clerical state." (can. 1379)
3. "One who throws away the consecrated species or, for a sacrilegious purpose, takes them away or keeps them, incurs a latae sententiae excommunication reserved to the Apostolic See; a cleric, moreover, may be punished with some other penalty, not excluding dismissal from the clerical state." (can. 1382)
4. "A priest who acts against the prescription of can. 977 incurs a latae sententiae excommunication reserved to the Apostolic See." (can. 1384) Canon 977 states that the absolution of an accomplice in a sin against the sixth commandment of the Decalogue is invalid except in danger of death; i.e., if a priest commits a sexual sin with someone, he cannot then absolve that person of the sin.
5. "A confessor who directly violates the sacramental seal incurs a latae sententiae excommunication reserved to the Apostolic See; he who does so only indirectly is to be punished according to the gravity of the offence." (can. 1386)
6. "Both the Bishop who, without a pontifical mandate, consecrates a person a Bishop, and the one who receives the consecration from him, incur a latae sententiae excommunication reserved to the Apostolic See." (can. 1387)

During the Extraordinary Jubilee of Mercy, Pope Francis gave to special qualified and experienced priests, called "Missionaries of Mercy", the faculty to forgive even special-case sins normally reserved to the Holy See's Apostolic Penitentiary. Originally, their mandate was to expire at the close of the Holy Year, but the Pope extended it, permitting them to continue hearing confessions freely in every diocese throughout the world and lifting censures that normally require the permission of the pope.

== Latin Church ==
Excommunication in the Latin Church is governed by the 1983 Code of Canon Law (1983 CIC). The 1983 code specifies various sins which carry the penalty of automatic excommunication: apostasy, heresy, schism (1983 CIC 1364:1), violating the sacred species (can. 1367), physically attacking the Pope (can. 1370:1), sacramentally absolving an accomplice in a sexual sin (CIC 1378:1), consecrating a bishop without authorization (can. 1382), directly violating the seal of confession (can. 1388:1), and someone who actually procures an abortion.

Excommunication can be either latae sententiae (automatic, incurred at the moment of committing the offense for which canon law imposes that penalty) or ferendae sententiae (incurred only when imposed by a legitimate superior or declared as the sentence of an ecclesiastical court).

A priest who grants absolution of an accomplice in a sin against the sixth commandment of the Decalogue incurs a latae sententiae excommunication reserved to the Apostolic See.

The severance from the church as an effect of excommunication is a matter of controversy in modern times, though this was not always so; excommunication vitandi was clearly supposed to have the effect of removal of the Christian from the body of the church. Moreover, the very word "excommunication" by its etymological meaning seems to indicate that it does indeed remove the Christian from the church. But, others, such as Bishop Thomas J. Paprocki, suppose it does not: "excommunication does not expel the person from the Catholic Church, but simply forbids the excommunicated person from engaging in certain activities". These activities are listed in canon 1331 §1, and prohibit the individual from any ministerial participation in celebrating the sacrifice of the Eucharist or any other ceremonies of worship; celebrating or receiving the sacraments; or exercising any ecclesiastical offices, ministries, or functions. At any rate, it is clear that the excommunicated remains a Christian in the sense that he retains his baptism, but at the same time is estranged from the church, and in this sense "is cast outside of it". If the excommunication is, in the formal legal sense, publicly known—that is, in case of both a "declared" latae sententia excommunication (judged upon by the responsible Church court) and in any ferendae sententia excommunication (always imposed by the Church court), any acts of ecclesiastical governance by the excommunicated person are not only illicit but also invalid.

Under current Catholic canon law, excommunicates remain bound by ecclesiastical obligations such as attending Mass, even though they are barred from receiving the Eucharist and from taking an active part in the liturgy (reading, bringing the offerings, etc.). "Excommunicates lose rights, such as the right to the sacraments, but they are still bound to the obligations of the law; their rights are restored when they are reconciled through the remission of the penalty."

These are the only effects for those who have incurred a latae sententiae excommunication. For instance, a priest may not refuse Holy Communion publicly to those who are under an automatic excommunication, as long as it has not been officially declared to have been incurred by them, even if the priest knows that they have incurred it. On the other hand, if the priest knows that excommunication has been imposed on someone or that an automatic excommunication has been declared (and is no longer merely an undeclared automatic excommunication), he is forbidden to administer Holy Communion to that person (see canon 915).

In the Catholic Church, excommunication is normally resolved by a declaration of repentance, profession of the Creed (if the offense involved heresy) and an Act of Faith, or renewal of obedience (if that was a relevant part of the offending act, i.e., an act of schism) by the excommunicated person and the lifting of the censure (absolution) by a priest or bishop empowered to do this. "The absolution can be in the internal (private) forum only, or also in the external (public) forum, depending on whether scandal would be given if a person were privately absolved and yet publicly considered unrepentant."

=== Effects of excommunication ===
An excommunicated person is forbidden to engage in certain activities enumerated in canon 1331 §1 of the 1983 Code of Canon Law. These precluded activities include any ministerial participation in celebrating the sacrifice of the Eucharist or any other ceremonies of worship whatsoever; the celebration and reception of the sacraments; and the exercise of any ecclesiastical offices, ministries, or functions. The individual, furthermore, cannot validly acquire a dignity, office, or other function in the church; may not appropriate the benefits of a dignity, office, any function, or pension, which the offender has in the church; and is forbidden to benefit from privileges previously granted.

Salaverri and Nicolau state that "the internal supernatural goods, such as sanctifying grace and the infused virtues, are not taken away by the censure [excommunication] itself".

=== Criticism of excommunication ===
Luther was critical because he thought the existing practice commingled secular and ecclesiastical punishments. To him, civil penalties were outside the domain of the church and were instead the responsibility of civil authorities. Non-spiritual expiatory penalties may be applied in some other cases, especially for clergy. These have been criticized for being overly punitive and inadequately pastoral. For example, a member of the clergy might be ordered to live in a particular monastery for a period of time, or even the rest of his life, a punishment comparable to house arrest. Access to electronic devices may also be restricted for persons sentenced to a life of prayer and penance.

=== Reforms in 1983 ===
One reform in the 1983 code was that non-Catholic Christians are not assumed to be culpable for not being Roman Catholic, and are not discussed or treated as excommunicated Catholics guilty of heresy or schism. Another reform in 1983 was a list of extenuating circumstances in canon 1324 which could prevent excommunication or lessen other punishments.

== Eastern Catholic Churches ==
Eastern Catholic Churches distinguish between minor and major excommunication.

Those on whom minor excommunication has been imposed are excluded from receiving the Eucharist and can also be excluded from participating in the Divine Liturgy. They can even be excluded from entering a church when divine worship is being celebrated there. The decree of excommunication must indicate the precise effect of the excommunication and, if required, its duration.

Those under major excommunication are in addition forbidden to receive not only the Eucharist but also the other sacraments, to administer sacraments or sacramentals, to exercise any ecclesiastical offices, ministries, or functions whatsoever, and any such exercise by them is null and void. They are to be removed from participation in the Divine Liturgy and any public celebrations of divine worship. They are forbidden to make use of any privileges granted to them and cannot be given any dignity, office, ministry, or function in the church, they cannot receive any pension or emoluments associated with these dignities etc., and they are deprived of the right to vote or to be elected.

== See also ==
- Interdict
- List of excommunicable offences in the Catholic Church
- List of people excommunicated by the Catholic Church
- List of cardinals excommunicated by the Catholic Church
- Closed communion
- Shunning#In religion
