= List of excommunicable offences in the Catholic Church =

This is a list, in chronological order, of present and past offences to which the Catholic Church has attached the penalty of excommunication; the list is not exhaustive. In most cases these were "automatic excommunications", wherein the violator who knowingly breaks the rule is considered automatically excommunicated from the Church regardless of whether a bishop (or the pope) has excommunicated them publicly. However, in a few cases, a bishop would need to name the person who violated the rule for them to be excommunicated.

Excommunication is an ecclesiastical penalty or censure placed on a person to encourage them to return to communion with the Church. An excommunicated person cannot receive any of the sacraments or exercise any office within the Church until their excommunication is lifted by a valid authority, usually a bishop. Previously, other penalties could also be attached. In cases where excommunication is reserved to the apostolic see, only the Bishop of Rome (i.e., the pope) has the power to lift the excommunication. Before 1869, the Church distinguished "major" and "minor" excommunications; a major excommunication was often marked by simply writing, "Let them be anathema" in council documents. Only offences from the 1983 Code of Canon Law still have legal effect in the Church.

== First Council of Nicaea (325 AD) ==
- As a priest or deacon, leaving one's church recklessly and failing to return to one's diocese.

== Council of Saragossa (380) ==
- Receiving Holy Communion by hand. Reaffirmed at the Synod of Toledo (440). Ceased to be an offense in the Latin Church in 1969.

== First Council of Constantinople (381) ==
- Following any of the following heresies:
  - Eunomianism and Anomoeansmism (that Christ is of an entirely different nature from the Father)
  - Arianism and Eudoxianism (that Christ was created by and thus distinct from God)
  - Semi-Arianism (that the Son and the Spirit, albeit divine, were created by and thus inferior to the Father)
  - Pneumatomachianism (also called Macedonianism, that the Holy Spirit was created by the Son and not divine, and that the Son was of the same substance but a different essence from the Father)
  - Sabellianism (also called monarchianism, that the Father and the Son are the same person)
  - Marcellianisn (also called antinomeanism or libertinism, a supposedly Gnostic belief that only faith and love are necessary to attain salvation, obedience to laws being unnecessary, and that Jesus was only a man, not divine)
  - Photinianism (denying the divinity and pre-existence of Christ)
  - Apollinarism (that Jesus' rational mind was divine, not human)

== Council of Ephesus (431) ==
- Seeking to upset the decisions of the council of Ephesus.
- Failing to confess that Jesus is God and Mary is the Mother of God, or that the Word from God the Father has become flesh in Jesus Christ and is God and man in one flesh.
- Dividing the hypostatic union of Christ, claiming that the two aspects (divine and human) are not united.
- Claiming that some aspects of Jesus belong to his human part and others to his divine part, rather than belonging to both together.
- Claiming that Jesus was a God-bearing man and not God in truth.
- Claiming that the Word from God was the master of Christ and not the same person.
- Claiming that Jesus as a man was activated by the Word of God and clothed with the glory of God, as though it was separate from him.
- Claiming that Jesus ought to be worshipped with the Divine Word.
- Claiming that Jesus' miracles and exorcism were done by the Holy Spirit as an alien power working through him, and not by Jesus' own spirit.
- Claiming that Jesus became our High Priest, but the Word of God did not become our High Priest, or that Jesus' sacrifice was for himself also.
- Claiming that the body of Christ is not the Word of God and is not life-giving.
- Failing to confess that the Word of God became flesh, suffered, died and was resurrected.
- As a layperson, composing a new creed, different from the Nicene Creed, for the benefit of converting people.
- As a layperson, following the teachings of Nestorius or Charisius regarding the nature of Christ.
- As a layperson in the region of Pamphylia, failing to sign the anathema against the Euchites.

== Council of Chalcedon (451) ==
- Founding a monastery without the approval of the local diocese's bishop; as a monk, failing to obey the local bishop's authority; as a monastery, accepting a slave as a monk without receiving permission from the slave's master.
- Running a monasteries, martyr's shrine or almshouse without obeying the local bishop's authority.
- Marrying as a monk or nun.
- As a bishop, receiving a priest into one's diocese who belongs to another diocese. The priest is also excommunicated in this scenario.
- Claiming Christ had two natures before the union but a single one after the union.
- Attempting to produce another creed.
- Assisting in a simoniacal ordination (i.e., buying the sacrament of holy orders).
- Priests or religious who go into military service or politics.
- Carrying off girls under the pretext of cohabitation or assist in such.

== Second Council of Constantinople (553) ==
- Contradicting the doctrine of hypostatic union defined by the council, including the pre-existence of Christ and his incarnation as a man born of a woman. Specific anathemas were pronounced against Theodore of Mopsuestia, Theodoret, the letter from Ibas to Mari the Persian, and Nestorians. This anathema is made in a very verbose manner, condemning specific beliefs and writings.
- Denying the perpetual virginity of Mary, or her status as the mother of God. (The former offence is defined in passing, by describing her as "ever-virgin".)
- Failing to anathematize Arius, Eunomius, Macedonius, Apollinarius Nestorius, Eutyches and Origen, their works, and those anathematized by the previous four synods.

== Third Council of Constantinople (680–681) ==
- Any religious or laity who attempt to produce another faith, to make or teach or support a new creed, or who use new definitions or novelties or terminology that somehow cancels what has been defined by the council.

== Second Council of Nicaea (787) ==
- Following any of the heretics mentioned at the council in rejecting church tradition, devising innovations, spurning the things trusted to the church, fabricating evil prejudices against the church's tradition, or secularizing a sacred object or holy monastery.
- Being in communion with a bishop who acquires his diocese through the help of secular rulers.
- Preventing the required canonical gatherings of bishops from taking place.
- Hiding writings composed against the venerable icons.
- Seizing certain houses belonging to the church referred to in the council and failing to return them.
- Following the teachings of Arius, Nestorius, Severus of Antioch, Peter the Fuller, Sergius I of Constantinople, Pyrrhus of Constantinople, Pope Honorius I, Cyrus of Alexandria, or Macarius I of Antioch.
- Condemning the artistic representation of Christ in his humanity.
- Rejecting representation in art of evangelical scenes.
- Failing to salute such representations as standing for the Lord and his saints.
- Rejecting any written or unwritten tradition of the church.
- Assisting in a simoniacal purchase of ordination.

== Fourth Council of Constantinople (869–870) ==
- Disobeying the decrees of several popes named by the council.
- As a lay person, inviting a person excommunicated by the council to paint sacred images or to teach.
- As a lay person, failing to observe the council's decrees concerning the voiding of contracts made by Photius.
- Mocking holy things in the manner described by the council or allowing such mockery to take place of things proper to priests. Emperors and others in power were spared if they repented quickly. Others were excommunicated for three years.
- As a metropolitan bishop, refusing to come to one's patriarch when summoned unless delayed by pagan invasion or genuine illness, or falsely pretending to have no knowledge of the summoning or hiding.
- As an archbishop or metropolitan, visiting another diocese under the pretext of an official visitation and greedily consuming what belongs to the other diocese.
- As a bishop, granting the property of a diocese other than one's own as a gift to someone or who installs priests in another diocese.
- Rejecting the council's directive that a metropolitan can only be judged by a patriarch and not by another metropolitan.
- Following the teachings of Arius.
- Claiming that the Divine Word came about and existed by fantasy and supposition.
- Rejecting the council's condemnation of Photius or supporting him.
- Rejecting the veneration of icons of Jesus Christ, the Virgin Mary, the angels or saints.
- Falsifying the word of truth, going through the motions of having false vicars or composing books full of deceptions, explaining them in "favour of his own designs".
- Believing that the human being has two souls, rather than one.
- Buying (or acquiring) property belonging to the church, when the bishop selling or giving this property did not have the right to sell or give it, and failing to return this property after buying or acquiring it.
- As a secular person, removing goods or privileges from the church by force.
- As a secular ruler, attempting to use force to expel the pope or a patriarch.
- As a secular ruler or lay person, attempting to act against the proper legal process in a canonical election for a bishop.

== First Lateran Council (1123) ==
- Carrying off or violating the family or property of crusaders while they are on crusade.
- As laity, taking offerings from the altars or crosses from any church.
- Violating a truce and failing to listen to a bishop's admonition to make reparation when the admonition is given three times.
- Taking part in the military conquest of Benevento from the pope.
- Harming a church or a person who works in it.

== Sicut Judaeis ==
- Violating the bull's rules concerning the protection of Jews, including forcibly converting them.

== Second Lateran Council (1139) ==
- Violently attacking a cleric or monk (excommunication reserved to the apostolic see).
- Posing as a nun and receiving guests and secular persons in violation of good morals, unless actually following the rule of Benedict, Basil or Augustine.
- As a canon of the episcopal see, preventing new elections of bishops from taking place in vacant dioceses.
- Fighting against Christians as a crossbowman or archer.
- Illicitly seizing the goods of a deceased bishop.
- As a lay person, being in possession of a church and failing to restore it to a bishop.
- Ignoring warnings of a bishop three times to follow a Christian truce.
- Laying hands on someone who flees to a church or cemetery.
- Engaging in arson or assisting an arsonist.

== Third Lateran Council (1179) ==
- As a layperson, appointing or dismissing a cleric from a church, or seizing, taxing or distributing church property according to one's own will (see Investiture controversy).
- Imposing an unjust burden on a church or seizing the goods of a church.
- Sharing a household with a Jew or Muslim.
- Accepting the testimony of a Jewish witness over the testimony of a Christian witness in a legal case.
- Supporting, receiving or trading with a Cathar.
- Claiming to be Pope, or supporting such a claimant, after an election which fails to reach the required two-thirds majority. This was a reaction to the recent antipopes Victor IV, Paschal III and Callixtus III.
- Acting against the council's decree regarding the return of property taken by schismatics.
- As a layperson, transferring one's tithe to another layperson.
- As a layperson, engaging in the "unnatural vice" for which the wrath of God came upon Sodom and Gomorrah. This is a euphemism for sex between men.
- Ignoring the warnings of a bishop three times to follow a Christian truce.
- Selling wood, weapons or other materials to a Muslim which can be used to fight wars with Christians, or who hiring oneself out to be a captain or pilot of a Muslim warship. (The same decree also called on Catholics to confiscate their possessions and enslave the person who was caught doing this.)
- Robbing a Roman or other Christian who sails for trade or honourable purposes.
- Robbing a shipwrecked Christian.
- As a Christian ruler, seizing or failing to return the possessions of a Jew who has converted to Christianity.
- Molesting a crusader fighting against the Cathars.

== Fourth Lateran Council (1215) ==
- Being a heretic.
- Being suspected of heresy and failing to prove one's innocence.
- As a temporal ruler, not expelling heretics from one's lands after being instructed by the church to do so.
- Receiving, defending or supporting heretics.
- Making contact with a heretic pointed out by the church and branded as infamous.
- Preaching the gospel without church approval.
- As a member of the Greek Church who has returned to communion with the Catholic church, washing an altar after it has been used by Latin Catholics in order to cleanse it, or re-baptizing a person already baptized into the Latin Catholic church.
- As a bishop, violating the rules the council set down for a diocese that has believers with different languages and rites.
- Imposing taxes on the church.
- As a crusader, refusing to carry out the vows one made to go on crusade.
- Failing to carry out the duties imposed by the council for raising money for the crusade.
- Dealing with Jews who practise usury.
- Being a corsair or pirate on the Mediterranean Sea.
- Supplying timber for ships, iron or arms to Muslims (the same decree also called on Christians to enslave people who did this).
- Engaging in tournaments from 1215 to 1218.
- Waging war against a Christian ruler between 1215 and 1219.
- Providing medical treatment to help a person's body which is a danger to the person's soul.

== First Council of Lyons (1245) ==
- All who offer "advice, help or favour" to excommunicated Emperor Frederick II are automatically excommunicated.
- Any Christian ruler who uses assassins to kill people with the intention of catching them in a state of mortal sin when killed (so the assassinated persons are punished with eternal damnation in hell) incurs automatic excommunication.
- Any who are guilty in deceit with regard to the measures intended to help fund the crusade called for by the council are automatically excommunicated.
- All Christians who engage in dealings with Jews who are usurers.
- Corsairs and pirates on the Mediterranean, their principal helpers and supporters.
- Christians who sold iron, timber for ships or arms to Muslims.
- All who engage in tournaments from 1245 to 1248.
- Christians who failed to observe universal peace in Christendom from 1245 to 1249.
- All Christians who take their ships to Muslim ports from 1245 to 1249.

== Second Council of Lyons (1274) ==
- "All who knowingly offer hindrance, directly or indirectly, publicly or secretly, to the payment" for the crusade proposed at the council.
- Corsairs and pirates on the Mediterranean, their principal helpers and supporters.
- Christians who engage in business dealings with pirates and corsairs on the Mediterranean (the decree called for these people to be enslaved).
- Christians who sold iron, timber for ships or arms to Muslims.
- Christians who failed to observe a universal peace in Christendom from 1274 to 1280.
- All Christians who take their ships to Muslim ports from 1274 to 1280.
- Anyone outside of a papal conclave who attempts to send a message or communicate with a cardinal in a conclave received a latae sententiae excommunication.
- Civil authorities in control of a town or city in which a papal conclave is taking place who commit fraud with regard to their obligations towards the conclave received a latae sententiae excommunication.
- Anyone who oppresses clerics or other ecclesiastical persons, because they did not elect the person that the oppressor desired elected or for other reasons, received a latae sententiae excommunication.
- All who attempt to unlawfully take offices or dignities during a vacancy, along with anyone who helps them, received a latae sententiae excommunication.
- All who use force or fear to get an ecclesiastical authority to lift an excommunication from someone are themselves excommunicated.
- All who unlawfully seize church property received a latae sententiae excommunication.
- Those who violated what the council set down in Article 23 regarding religious houses are excommunicated.
- Lay people who rent houses to usurers or fail to expel them are excommunicated.
- Those who engage in "reprisals" against ecclesiastical persons receive a latae sententiae excommunication.
- Anyone who, using someone else's excommunication as a pretext, decides to kill, molest or otherwise harm the excommunicated person or his goods because he is excommunicated, is himself excommunicated; those who persist longer than two months receive an excommunication reserved to the apostolic see.

== Council of Vienne (1311) ==
- All who fail to follow the council's instructions regarding the suppression of the Knights Templar.
- All who attempt to enter the Templars, wear their habit or act as though they are a Templar.
- All who knowingly give counsel, aid or favour to those occupying or detaining property belonging to the Knights Hospitaller.
- Hospitallers who publicly receive excommunicated persons, those under interdict, notorious usurers, those who give them Catholic burials, the sacraments or solemnize their marriages.

== Council of Basel–Ferrara–Florence (1431–1445) ==
Since theological historians have doubts about the ecumenical character of council sessions, the session number and location of each ruling are included:

- (Session 4 - Basel) All who fail to obey the council's command to call on the Pope to attend the council and to revoke his previous dissolution of the council.
- (Session 4 - Basel) All who attempt to go against what the council commanded in saying that should the papal office become vacant during the council, the new election for a pope would be held at the council.
- (Session 8 - Basel) All who attempt to convoke a rival council at Bologna or anywhere else while this council was taking place.
- (Session 12- Basel) All who take part in simoniacal elections (i.e., making someone pope or bishop through bribery) receive an automatic excommunication reserved to the Holy See.
- (Session 19- Basel) Anyone who vexes or makes an issue out of property that a convert unjustly held but had given to the church, and which the church then put to pious use.
- (Session 2 -Ferrara) All who directly or indirectly attempt to molest people attending the Council receive an automatic excommunication reserved to the Holy See.
- (Session 31-Ferrara) All who continue to hold council at Basel while the Council of Ferrara is convoked are automatically excommunicated.
- (Session 31-Ferrara) All civil authorities at Basel who fail to expel those attending the Council of Basel after 30 days.
- (Session 31-Ferrara) All who continue to travel to Basel or trade there, if the members of the Council of Basel continue to meet there after 30 days.
- (Session 31-Ferrara) All merchants doing business in Basel who fail to leave while the Council of Basel continues to take place.
- (Session 11-Florence) All who reject the Council's teaching concerning the Trinity.
- (Session 14-Florence) All who claim that Chaldean or Maronite Catholics are heretics.

== Fifth Lateran Council (1512–1517) ==
- Any cardinal who engages in a simoniacal papal election (i.e., electing someone to the papacy through bribery) incurs a latae sententiae excommunication reserved to the apostolic see.
- Whoever violated the terms of the bull, Pastoralis officii, incurs a latae sententiae excommunication reserved to the Apostolic See.
- Those who were called to the council and do not attend without legitimate excuse incur excommunication.
- Any cleric who wears multicoloured clothing not in keeping with his clerical status, whose clothes are not at least ankle-length, or any head of a cathedral, Catholic college or chaplain to a cardinal who fails to wear a head covering in public, or clerics who pay too much attention to their hair or beards, or clerics who use silk and velvet instead of cloth and leather for their horses or mules, receives excommunication if he continues to do so after receiving a legitimate warning.
- Any cardinal who participated in a consistory who reveals the votes cast there, or who reveals what was said or done during a consistory if this information was meant to be kept secret or could be damaging to the church or a participant at the conclave, receives a penalty of latae sententiae excommunication reserved to the Apostolic See.
- Secular rulers who seize church property and fail to return it receive a latae sententiae excommunication.
- Secular rulers who exact tithes or taxes from clerics, even if the clerics freely agree to it, are excommunicated.
- Those who provide help or advice to rulers attempting to do the above are also excommunicated.
- Priests who freely give church property to civil authorities without permission from the pope are also automatically excommunicated.
- Laypeople who engage in sorcery are excommunicated.
- Anyone who attempts to rashly make commentaries or interpretations of the constitutions of the council without permission receive a penalty of automatic excommunication.
- All religious or clergy who preach or argue against the council's decision on the reform of credit organizations are subject to automatic excommunication.
- Church authorities who do not give the required written warrants for publishing books freely and without delay are excommunicated.
- Any publisher who acts against the church's rules concerning punishments for printing banned books is excommunicated.
- Anyone who fails to observe the council's commands regarding visions and revelations (that they are to be first subject to examination by the pope, or the local ordinary if the pope is not available, before being publicized) receive a penalty of latae sententiae excommunication reserved to the apostolic see.
- Those who act contrary to the council's decisions regarding the pragmatic sanction are punished with an automatic excommunication.
- Procurators, business agents and workers assisting excommunicated persons trying to enter a mendicant order are themselves excommunicated.
- Anyone who attempts to interpret or gloss what was done in the council without permission is automatically excommunicated.

== In eminenti apostolates (1738) ==
- Catholics who join masonic lodges or who take part in their meetings are excommunicated.

== Apostolicae Sedis Moderationi (1869) ==
- all who fight duels, or challenge to a duel or accept such challenge; as well as against all who are accessory to the or who in any way abet or encourage the same; and finally against those who are present at a duel as spectators [de industria spectantes], or those who permit the same, or do not prevent it, whatever their rank, even if they were kings or emperors

== First Vatican Council (1869–1870) ==
- If anyone denies the one true God, creator and lord of things visible and invisible, let him be anathema.
- If anyone is so bold as to assert that there exists nothing besides matter, let him be anathema.
- If anyone says that the substance or essence of God and all things are one and the same, let him be anathema.
- If anyone says that finite things corporal and spiritual or, at any rate, spiritual, emanated from the divine substance; or that the divine essence, by the manifestation and evolution of itself becomes all things or, finally, that God is a universal or indefinite being which by self-determination establishes the totality of things distinct in genera, species and individuals, let him be anathema.
- If anyone does not confess that the world and all things which are contained in it, both spiritual and material, were produced according to their whole substance out of nothing by God; or holds that God did not create by his will free from all necessity, but as necessarily as he necessarily loves himself; or denies that the world was created for the glory of God, let him be anathema.
- If anyone says that the one true God, our creator and lord, cannot be known with certainty from the things that have been made by the natural light of human reason, let him be anathema.
- If anyone says that it is impossible (or not expedient) that human beings should be taught by means of divine revelation about God and the worship that should be shown him, let him be anathema.
- If anyone says that a human being cannot be divinely elevated to a knowledge and perfection which exceeds the natural but, of himself, can (and must) reach finally the possession of all truth and goodness by continual development, let him be anathema.
- If anyone does not receive as sacred and canonical the complete books of sacred scripture with all their parts (as the holy council of Trent listed them) or denies that they were divinely inspired, let him be anathema.
- If anyone says that human reason is so independent that faith cannot be commanded by God, let him be anathema.
- If anyone says that divine faith is not to be distinguished from natural knowledge about God and moral matters and, consequently, that for divine faith it is not required that revealed truth should be believed because of the authority of God who reveals it, let him be anathema.
- If anyone says that divine revelation cannot be made credible by external signs and that, therefore, men and women ought to be moved to faith only by each one's internal experience or private inspiration, let him be anathema.
- If anyone says that all miracles are impossible and, therefore, all reports of them (even those contained in sacred scripture) are to be set aside as fables or myths; or that miracles can never be known with certainty, nor the divine origin of the Christian religion be proved from them, let him be anathema.
- If anyone says that the assent to Christian faith is not free, but is necessarily produced by arguments of human reason; or that the grace of God is necessary only for living faith which works by charity, let him be anathema.
- If anyone says that the condition of the faithful and those who have not yet attained to the only true faith is alike, so that Catholics may have a just cause for calling in doubt (by suspending their assent) the faith which they have already received from the teaching of the church until they have completed a scientific demonstration of the credibility and truth of their faith, let him be anathema.
- If anyone says that in divine revelation there are contained no true mysteries properly so-called, but all dogmas of the faith can be understood and demonstrated by properly-trained reason from natural principles, let him be anathema.
- If anyone says that human studies are to be treated with such liberty that their assertions may be maintained as true even when they are opposed to divine revelation and they may not be forbidden by the church, let him be anathema.
- If anyone says that it is possible that at some time, given the advancement of knowledge, a sense may be assigned to the dogmas propounded by the church which is different from that which the church has understood and understands, let him be anathema.
- If anyone says that blessed Peter the apostle was not appointed by Christ the lord as prince of all the apostles and visible head of the whole church militant; or that it was a primacy of honour only and not true and proper jurisdiction which he directly and immediately received from our lord Jesus Christ himself, let him be anathema.
- If anyone says that it is not by the institution of Christ the lord himself (that is to say, by divine law) that blessed Peter should have perpetual successors in primacy over the whole church; or that the Roman pontiff is not the successor of blessed Peter in this primacy, let him be anathema.
- If anyone says that the Roman pontiff has merely an office of supervision and guidance and not the full and supreme power of jurisdiction over the whole church, and this not only in matters of faith and morals but also in those which concern the discipline and government of the church dispersed throughout the whole world; or that he has only the principal part, but not the absolute fullness, of this supreme power; or that this power of his is not ordinary and immediate over the churches, the pastors and the faithful, let him be anathema.
- [We] define as a divinely revealed dogma that when the Roman pontiff speaks ex cathedra [...] such definitions of the Roman pontiff are of themselves, and not by the consent of the church, irreformable. [S]hould anyone, which God forbid, have the temerity to reject this definition of ours: let him be anathema.

== 1917 Code of Canon Law ==
The first unified code of Catholic canon law was produced in 1917, and it replaced all previous rules regarding excommunication which had come from councils and papal documents. The 1983 Code of Canon Law replaced the 1917 code. Therefore, only the 1983 code still has legal standing with regard to excommunicable offences.

== Decree Against Communism (1949) ==
- Catholics who defended or promoted materialistic or atheistic Communist doctrine incurred excommunication until the 1983 canon law abrogated the decree.

== 1983 Code of Canon Law ==
- Canon 1364 – An apostate from the faith, a heretic, or a schismatic incurs a latae sententiae excommunication.
- Canon 1367 - A person who throws away consecrated species, or takes (or retains) them for a sacrilegious purpose, incurs a latae sententiae excommunication reserved to the apostolic see.
- Canon 1370 - A person who uses physical force against the Roman pontiff incurs a latae sententiae excommunication reserved to the apostolic see.
- Canon 1378 - A priest who acts against the prescript of Canon 977 incurs a latae sententiae excommunication reserved to the apostolic see (Canon 977 prohibits a priest from giving absolution to someone with whom he has had unlawful carnal relations).
- Canon 1379 § 3 - Both a person who attempts to confer a sacred order on a woman, and the woman who attempts to receive the sacred order.
- Canon 1382 - A bishop who consecrates a bishop without a pontifical mandate, and the person who receives the consecration, incur a latae sententiae excommunication reserved to the apostolic see.
- Canon 1388 - A confessor who directly violates the sacramental seal incurs a latae sententiae excommunication reserved to the apostolic see.
- Canon 1397 §2 - A person who procures a completed abortion incurs a latae sententiae excommunication.

Canon 1324 includes a number of exceptions from excommunicable offences:

- By a person who had only the imperfect use of reason;
- By a person who lacked the use of reason because of drunkenness or similar culpable disturbance of mind;
- From grave heat of passion which did not precede (and hinder) all deliberation of mind and consent of will, provided that the passion itself had not been stimulated or fostered voluntarily;
- By a minor who has not yet completed the age of sixteen years;
- By a person who was coerced by grave fear (even if only relatively-grave), or due to necessity or grave inconvenience if the delict is intrinsically evil or tends to the harm of souls;
- By a person who acted without due moderation against an unjust aggressor for the sake of legitimate self-defense or defense of another;
- Against someone who gravely and unjustly provokes the person;
- By a person who thought (in culpable error) that one of the circumstances mentioned in Canon 1323, numbers 4 or 5 was present;
- By a person who, without negligence, did not know that a penalty was attached to a law or precept;
- By a person who acted without full imputability, provided that the imputability was grave.

According to Canon 1329, unnamed accomplices may receive the same penalty when an excommunicable act is committed.

== See also ==
- List of people excommunicated by the Catholic Church
- 1917 Code of Canon Law
- Council of Chalcedon
- Council of Constance
- Council of Ephesus
- Council of Florence
- Council of Trent
- Council of Vienne
- Fifth Council of the Lateran
- First Council of Constantinople
- First Council of the Lateran
- First Council of Lyon
- First Council of Nicaea
- First Vatican Council
- Fourth Council of Constantinople
- Fourth Council of the Lateran
- Peace and Truce of God
- Second Council of Constantinople
- Second Council of the Lateran
- Second Council of Lyon
- Second Council of Nicaea
- Sicut Judaeis
- Third Council of Constantinople
- Third Council of the Lateran
- Tournament (medieval)
