= Catholic canon =

Catholic canon may refer to:

- Canon law of the Catholic Church
  - 1983 Code of Canon Law
    - 1917 Code of Canon Law
  - Code of Canons of the Eastern Churches
- The Catholic Bible, canon of the books of the Bible recognised by the Catholic Church
- Canon (clergy)

== See also ==
- Canon (canon law)
