= State of necessity =

A state of necessity may refer to:

- Canon 1324
- Doctrine of necessity
- Military necessity
- Necessity (criminal law)
- Necessity (tort)
- State of exception
