= Canon 1324 =

Catholic Church law

Canon 1324 is a canon of the 1983 Code of Canon Law that enumerates situations according to which penalties prescribed in canon law must be diminished or replaced by a penance. The canon does not automatically remove the penalty completely except in cases of latae sententiae (automatic) excommunication.

== Cases to which the canon applies ==
The diminution or replacement of the penalty must be applied if the offence was committed by:

1. Someone with imperfect use of reason
2. Someone temporarily lacking the use of reason because of drunkenness or some similar mental disturbance
3. Someone who, while not altogether losing the use of reason, acts in the heat of passion, without having deliberately provoked that passion
4. Someone not yet sixteen years old
5. Someone who acts out of grave fear, necessity or serious inconvenience when the act is intrinsically evil or tends to harm souls (if the act committed in these circumstances is not intrinsically evil or harmful to souls, then there is no penalty)
6. Someone who acts in lawful self-defence but without due moderation (if due moderation was used, then there is no penalty)
7. Someone who reacts against grave and unjust provocation by another
8. Someone who erroneously but culpably thought the circumstances mentioned in parentheses above under numbers 5 and 6 existed, circumstances that according to canon 1323 exempt from all penalty
9. Someone who was inculpably unaware that a penalty was attached to the law or precept against which he offended
10. Someone who acted with grave but not full imputability

In the circumstances listed above latae sententiae (automatic) excommunications do not apply.

A judge may diminish or replace a prescribed penalty also in view of other circumstances that reduce the gravity of the offence.

== Claimed applications ==
=== Excommunication of Marcel Lefebvre ===
The SSPX argues that Marcel Lefebvre's ordination of four bishops on 30 June 1988 (the Ecône consecrations) in contravention of a direct order from Pope John Paul II, was due to a state of necessity, citing in his defense canons 1323 and 1324 of the 1983 Code of Canon Law. However, the Pontifical Council for Legislative Texts rejected Lefebvre's claims, declaring in a 1996 explanatory note that "there is never a necessity to ordain Bishops contrary to the will of the Roman Pontiff".

Previously, Pope John Paul II responded directly to Lefebvre's argument in his document Ecclesia Dei (1988). The Pope declared that it is contradictory and ecclesiologically impossible to invoke a "state of necessity" to explicitly disobey the Vicar of Christ and break the unity of the Church. The Pope is the supreme guarantor of faith and unity; therefore, a crisis cannot be invoked to act against the one to whom Christ entrusted the governance of the Church, so the Lefebvre's justifications were based on "an incomplete and contradictory notion of Tradition".

=== Abortion on a minor in Brazil ===
In March 2009, after an abortion on a nine-year-old girl raped by her stepfather and pregnant with twins had been performed to save her life, Archbishop José Cardoso Sobrinho of Olinda and Recife stated that latae sententiae excommunication had been incurred by the girl's mother and the medical team. The National Conference of Bishops of Brazil disowned his statement, saying that, in accordance with canon law, the mother was certainly not excommunicated, since she had acted "out of grave fear" (cf. no. 5 of this canon) and there was insufficient evidence to show that any member of the medical team was acting with the full awareness and contumacy envisaged in this canon (cf. nos. 8 and 9). Bishop Jean-Michel di Falco of Gap, France also denied the applicability to the girl's mother of canon 1398 of the 1983 Code of Canon Law, which imposes automatic excommunication for procuring a completed abortion, pointing out that canon 1324 states that automatic censures, such as that which applies for such abortions, do not affect those who act out of grave fear.
