= Canon 915 =

Canon of the Catholic church

Canon 915, one of the canons in the 1983 Code of Canon Law of the Latin Church of the Catholic Church, forbids the administration of Holy Communion to those upon whom the penalty of excommunication or interdict has been imposed or declared, or who obstinately persist in manifest grave sin:

Those who have been excommunicated or interdicted after the imposition or declaration of the penalty and others obstinately persevering in manifest grave sin are not to be admitted to holy communion.

The corresponding canon in the Code of Canons of the Eastern Churches, which binds members of the Eastern Catholic Churches, reads: "The publicly unworthy are to be kept from the reception of the Divine Eucharist".

== Reception of Holy Communion ==
In general, Catholics who approach for Holy Communion have the right to receive the Eucharist, unless the law provides to the contrary, and canon 915 is just such an exception to the general norm. Anyone aware of having committed a grave sin is obliged to refrain from receiving Communion without first obtaining absolution in the sacrament of Reconciliation. In addition, canon 1331 §1 of the Code of Canon Law forbids an excommunicated person, even one who has incurred a latae sententiae (automatic) excommunication, from receiving Holy Communion or any other of the sacraments of the Catholic Church, except for Reconciliation, to be reconciled to the Church. Also forbidden to receive the sacraments is anyone who has been interdicted. These rules concern a person who is considering whether to receive Holy Communion, and in this way differ from the rule of canon 915, which concerns instead a person who administers the sacrament to others.

Canon 915 is immediately followed by canon 916, which concerns the minister of the Eucharist (priest or bishop) in case that it celebrates a Mass and the recipient of Holy Communion: "A person who is conscious of grave sin is not to celebrate Mass or receive the body of the Lord without previous sacramental confession unless there is a grave reason and there is no opportunity to confess; in this case the person is to remember the obligation to make an act of perfect contrition which includes the resolution of confessing as soon as possible."

== Administration of Holy Communion ==
The general rule of canon law is that "sacred ministers cannot deny the sacraments to those who seek them at appropriate times, are properly disposed, and are not prohibited by law from receiving them"; and "any baptized person not prohibited by law can and must be admitted to holy communion". Canon 915 not only permits the ministers to deny Holy Communion to certain classes of people, but actually obliges them to deny it to those classes of people.

== Classes of people to whom Communion is to be denied under canon 915 ==
=== Those under imposed or declared excommunication or interdict ===
Any excommunication or interdict obliges the person involved to refrain from receiving Holy Communion, but a minister is obliged to deny Holy Communion only to those on whom an ecclesiastical superior or tribunal has publicly imposed the censure or declared that it has in fact been incurred. Canon 915 thus does not apply in cases of undeclared latae sententiae (automatic) excommunication, such as that incurred, according to canon 1398, by someone who actually procures an abortion. While someone in this situation should not receive Communion until the excommunication is lifted, a priest may not on the grounds of the automatic excommunication refuse to administer the sacrament even if he knows of its existence.

=== Those who persist in manifest grave sin ===
It can be more difficult to determine whether in a particular case all four elements referred to are simultaneously present:

1. a sin,
2. which is grave,
3. which is manifest,
4. and which is obstinately persevered in.

The action must be a sin in the eyes of the Church, not merely something distasteful or irritating; personal guilt on the part of the person concerned is not required.

The sinful action must be "seriously disruptive of ecclesiastical or moral order".

To be manifest, the sin must be known to a large part of the community, a condition more easily met in a rural village than in an anonymous urban parish. Knowledge by the priest alone, in particular through the sacrament of confession, is not a justifying cause for denying Holy Communion. Public withholding of the Eucharist for little-known sins, even grave sins, is not permitted under canon law.

Neither an attitude of defiance nor a prior warning are required to determine the existence of obstinate persistence in manifest grave sin.

=== Divorced and civilly remarried Catholics ===
In 1981, Pope John Paul II issued the apostolic exhortation Familiaris consortio, which states, "the Church reaffirms her practice, which is based upon Sacred Scripture, of not admitting to Eucharistic Communion divorced persons who have remarried."

Two articles of the 1992 Catechism of the Catholic Church address the reception of the sacraments of Penance and Holy Communion by divorced persons who have remarried. Article 1650 states, "they cannot receive Eucharistic Communion as long as this situation persists." Article 1650 continues, "Reconciliation through the sacrament of Penance can be granted only to those who have repented for having violated the sign of the covenant and of fidelity to Christ, and who are committed to living in complete continence". Article 2390 states that outside of marriage, the sexual act "constitutes a grave sin and excludes one from sacramental communion".

In 1993 German bishops Walter Kasper, Karl Lehmann, and Oskar Saier had a letter read in the churches of their dioceses saying this question of Communion for divorced Catholics "in complex, individual cases" needed to be addressed. After the publication by the Holy See in 1994 of the Letter to the Bishops of The Catholic Church Concerning the Reception of Holy Communion by the Divorced and Remarried Members of the Faithful which stated that "the divorced are remarried civilly [...] cannot receive Holy Communion as long as this situation persists," Kasper and Lehmann "continued the debate in an informal group of prelates, nicknamed the St. Gallen group after the village in Switzerland where they met." In 2006, after Josef Ratzinger was elected, the group disbanded, but when Bergoglio was elected in 2013, Kasper returned to prominence on this issue.

The 1994 letter of the Congregation for the Doctrine of the Faith, the Letter to the Bishops of The Catholic Church Concerning the Reception of Holy Communion by the Divorced and Remarried Members of the Faithful, states that persons who have divorced and remarried cannot receive the sacraments of Penance and Holy Communion unless, where they cannot separate due to serious reasons, such as the upbringing of children, "they 'take on themselves the duty to live in complete continence, that is, by abstinence from the acts proper to married couples'". The letter also states that even if a divorced person is subjectively certain in conscience that their previous marriage had never been valid, this determination can only be made by a competent ecclesiastical tribunal.

In his encyclical Ecclesia de Eucharistia, Pope John Paul II states, "those who 'obstinately persist in manifest grave sin' are not to be admitted to Eucharistic communion".

The Pontifical Council for Legislative Texts (PCLT) issued on 24 June 2000 a declaration on the application of canon 915 of the Code of Canon Law to divorced Catholics who have remarried. According to the PCLT, this prohibition "is derived from divine law" and based on the canonical notion of "scandal", which exists even if this kind of behaviour "no longer arises surprise". Given the divine nature of this prohibition, "no ecclesiastical authority may dispense the minister of Holy Communion from this obligation in any case, nor may he emanate directives that contradict it." Public denial of Communion must be avoided and so the reasons for exclusion must be explained to them, but if such precautionary measures fail to obtain the desired effect or are impossible, Communion is not to be given to them.

In 2007, Pope Benedict XVI released the apostolic exhortation Sacramentum caritatis. Benedict XVI "confirmed the Church's practice, based on Sacred Scripture (cf. Mk 10:2- 12), of not admitting to the sacraments the divorced and remarried, since their state and their condition of life objectively contradict the loving union of Christ and the Church signified and made present in the Eucharist." With regard to divorced persons living in irregular unions, Benedict XVI stated, "Finally, where the nullity of the marriage bond is not declared and objective circumstances make it impossible to cease cohabitation, the Church encourages these members of the faithful to commit themselves to living their relationship in fidelity to the demands of God's law, as friends, as brother and sister; in this way they will be able to return to the table of the Eucharist, taking care to observe the Church's established and approved practice in this regard."

However, in September 2016, Pope Francis declared the apostolic exhortation Amoris laetitia to be a teaching of the "authentic magisterium", and agreed with the interpretation of Argentine bishops that "in certain circumstances, a person who has divorced and remarried and is living in an active sexual partnership might not be responsible or culpable for the mortal sin of adultery, 'particularly when a person judges that he would fall into a subsequent fault by damaging the children of the new union.' In this sense, 'Amoris Laetitia opens up the possibility of access to the sacraments of Reconciliation and the Eucharist'.”

Controversy arose following the publication of Amoris laetitia. Several cardinals and many theologians and canonists expressed their opposition to the communion of those in irregular unions, unless they live in full continence.

== Issues of dispute ==
=== Politicians consistently promoting permissive abortion or euthanasia laws ===
A memorandum of the Congregation for the Doctrine of the Faith on "Worthiness to Receive Holy Communion", signed by its Prefect Cardinal Joseph Ratzinger and published in July 2004, declared that, if a Catholic politician's formal cooperation in "the grave sin of abortion or euthanasia" becomes manifest by "consistently campaigning and voting for permissive abortion and euthanasia laws", the politician's pastor is obliged to instruct the politician about the Church's teaching and inform him that he should not present himself for Holy Communion as long as the objective situation of sin (regardless of whether subjective guilt exists or is absent) persists, warning him that, if he does present himself in those circumstances, he will be refused. As in the case of Catholics who divorce and remarry, if these precautionary measures fail to obtain the desired effect or are impossible, "and the person in question, with obstinate persistence, still presents himself to receive the Holy Eucharist, 'the minister of Holy Communion must refuse to distribute it'".

This ruling of the Congregation for the Doctrine of the Faith was cited in an article by Cardinal Raymond Leo Burke, Prefect of the Supreme Tribunal of the Apostolic Signatura in Periodica de re canonica, vol. 96 (2007), which listed precedents for it in the writings of the Church Fathers and theologians, in both older and more recent canon law and in ritual texts.

The ruling spoke of the obligations of the politician's pastor. With regard to the obligations of the diocesan bishop, the United States Conference of Catholic Bishops declared in 2004: "The question has been raised as to whether the denial of Holy Communion to some Catholics in political life is necessary because of their public support for abortion on demand. Given the wide range of circumstances involved in arriving at a prudential judgment on a matter of this seriousness, we recognize that such decisions rest with the individual bishop in accord with the established canonical and pastoral principles. Bishops can legitimately make different judgments on the most prudent course of pastoral action. [...] The polarizing tendencies of election-year politics can lead to circumstances in which Catholic teaching and sacramental practice can be misused for political ends. Respect for the Holy Eucharist, in particular, demands that it be received worthily and that it be seen as the source for our common mission in the world."

Cardinal Donald Wuerl of Washington has declared his opposition to such political use, with the Washington Post's Melinda Henneberger describing "Communion wielded as a weapon": in Wuerl's view, which he attributes also to the great majority of bishops in the United States and elsewhere, canon 915 "was never intended to be used this way", that is, to bring politicians to repentance.

The Congregation for the Doctrine of the Faith commented on the United States bishops' 2004 document: "The statement is very much in harmony with the general principles 'Worthiness to Receive Holy Communion, sent as a fraternal service – to clarify the doctrine of the Church on this specific issue – in order to assist the American Bishops in their related discussion and determinations'."

In an article written before publication of the 2004 memorandum of the Congregation for the Doctrine of the Faith and the statement by the United States Conference of Catholic Bishops, canonist John P. Beal had argued that canon 915 did not apply to pro-choice Catholic politicians.

Pope Francis reaffirmed the Catholic doctrine that politicians who encourage abortion and euthanasia should not take communion, in the Aparecida Document, in March 2013: "We hope that legislators [and] heads of government [...] will defend and protect [the dignity of human life] from the abominable crimes of abortion and euthanasia; that is their responsibility [...] We must adhere to "eucharistic coherence", that is, be conscious that they cannot receive Holy Communion and at the same time act with deeds or words against the commandments, particularly when abortion, euthanasia, and other grave crimes against life and family are encouraged. This responsibility weighs particularly over legislators, heads of governments, and health professionals."

== Other cases in which canon law mandates denial of access to Communion ==
Exclusion by canon law from access to Communion is not limited to the cases mentioned in canon 915. Canon 916 excludes from communion all those conscious of mortal sin who have not received sacramental absolution. Canon 842 §1 declares: "A person who has not received baptism cannot be admitted validly to the other sacraments."

It is also deemed appropriate to consider denying Communion "where someone is trying to use the Eucharist to make a political statement", and Communion has been refused to activists of the Rainbow Sash Movement on the grounds that it has never been acceptable to use the reception of Communion as a manifest act of protest.

== Cases where Holy Communion has been denied to recipients ==
After the Massacre of Thessalonica in Macedonia around 390 A.D., the Bishop of Milan Ambrose responded by writing Theodosius a personal and private letter. Ambrose urged a semi-public penitence, using the example of David and Uriah, telling the emperor that he cannot give Theodosius communion until he demonstrates repentance for the massacre. Wolf Liebeschuetz says "Theodosius duly complied and came to church without his imperial robes, until Christmas, when Ambrose openly admitted him to communion".

In 2019, Holy Communion was denied to Joe Biden due to his public stance regarding abortion, and to a woman in the Diocese of Grand Rapids who had contracted a same-sex civil marriage. Catholic commentators debated whether the denial of Holy Communion was appropriate in these cases, with many defending the decisions. The Diocese of Grand Rapids issued a statement supporting the decision of its priest.

In May 2022, Archbishop of San Francisco Salvatore Cordileone decided to bar Speaker of the House Nancy Pelosi from Communion in the San Francisco Archdiocese. Cordileone invoked canon 915 writing that a "Catholic legislator who supports procured abortion, after knowing the teaching of the Church, commits a manifestly grave sin which is a cause of most serious scandal to others."

== Parallel Anglican norm ==
The Book of Common Prayer requires the minister of Holy Communion to forbid access to "an open and notorious evil liver", until he publicly declare his repentance and amend his life.

== See also ==
- Papal ban of Freemasonry
- Eucharist in the Catholic Church
- Canon law of the Catholic Church
- 1983 Code of Canon Law
- Code of Canons of the Eastern Churches
- Catholic Church and politics in the United States
- Canon 844
