= Ipso facto =

Latin phrase used in many sciences

Ipso facto is a Latin phrase, directly translated as "by the fact itself", which means that a specific phenomenon is a direct consequence, a resultant effect, of the action in question, instead of being brought about by a previous action. (Contrast this with the expressions "by itself" or "per se".) It is a term of art used in philosophy, law, and science.

Aside from its technical uses, it occurs frequently in literature, particularly in scholarly addenda: e.g., "Faustus had signed his life away, and was, ipso facto, incapable of repentance" (from Christopher Marlowe, The Tragical History of Dr. Faustus) or "These prejudices are rooted in the idea that every tramp ipso facto is a blackguard" (from George Orwell, Down and Out in Paris and London).

== In Catholic canon law ==
Ipso facto denotes the automatic character of the loss of membership in a religious body by someone guilty of a specified action. Within the canon law of the Catholic Church, the phrase latae sententiae is more commonly used than ipso facto with regard to ecclesiastical penalties such as excommunication. It indicates that the effect follows even if no verdict (in Latin, sententia) is pronounced by an ecclesiastical superior or tribunal.

== See also ==
- List of Latin phrases
- Eo ipso
- Q.E.D.
- ergō
