= Canon 1397 paragraph 2 =

Latin Catholic legislation

Canon 1397 §2 is a paragraph of the canon 1397 of the 1983 Code of Canon Law of the Catholic Church; the paragraph states: "A person who actually procures an abortion incurs a latae sententiae excommunication".

Before the December 2021 reform, the content related to this topic was at canon 1398.

== Previous numbering and wording ==
Before the December 2021 reform, the canon 1398 of the 1983 Code of Canon Law of the Catholic Church stated: "A person who procures a completed abortion incurs a latae sententiae excommunication". Due to the reform, the legislation was renumbered as canon 1397 §2 and its wording was changed.

== Background ==
=== Nature of abortion ===
The Catholic Church opposes all forms of abortion procedures whose direct purpose is to destroy an embryo, blastocyst, zygote or foetus, since it holds that "human life must be respected and protected absolutely from the moment of conception. From the first moment of his existence, a human being must be recognized as having the rights of a person - among which is the inviolable right of every innocent being to life".

Mgr Elio Sgreccia, of the Pontifical Academy for Life, has declared that the canonical laws on abortion would also apply to anyone who takes an abortion pill.

Cardinal Alfonso López Trujillo, as head of the Pontifical Council for the Family, has argued that canon 1398 should also be interpreted in a sense that applies to embryonic stem cell researchers, given that the deliberate termination of embryonic cell reproduction is included as a form of abortion in official Church documents such as Donum Vitae, Evangelium Vitae and Dignitas Personae.

=== Nature of excommunication ===
In the Catholic Church, excommunication is an ecclesiastical censure imposed primarily not as punishment for the deed done, but for the purpose of breaking contumacy and reintegrating the offender in the community.

An excommunicated person is not cut off from the Church, but is barred from receiving the Eucharist and the other sacraments, and from taking a ministerial part in the liturgy (reading, bringing the offerings, etc.), while still being bound by obligations such as attending Mass.

Nobody is subject to any ecclesiastical censure except for an external violation by that person of a law or precept that is gravely imputable by reason of malice or negligence, but imputability is presumed unless the contrary is clear. Accordingly, no censure applies if the violator is not yet 16 years old, or is unaware (unless because of negligence) of violating a law, or who acted due to physical force or chance occurrence.

While no excommunication can be inflicted in those circumstances, automatic (latae sententiae) excommunication does not apply in certain other cases, of which the 1983 Code of Canon Law lists ten, including the cases of those who, although over 16 years of age, are still minors, or who act out of grave fear. A penalty or penance can still be imposed in such cases.

A declaration of repentance, followed by absolution given by a priest empowered to lift the censure, ends an excommunication such as that imposed by canon 1397 §2.

Canon 915 does not impose excommunication, but instead imposes on the minister of Holy Communion the obligation to refuse the sacrament to those who "obstinately persevere in manifest grave sin".

== 2009 case in Brazil ==
In 2009, Archbishop José Cardoso Sobrinho of Olinda and Recife stated that the automatic excommunication had been incurred by the mother and the doctors who had an abortion performed on a 9-year-old girl who was four months pregnant with twins resulting from abuse by her stepfather. His action was disavowed by the National Conference of Bishops of Brazil and in a front-page article of L'Osservatore Romano. The episcopal conference declared that the girl's mother certainly had not incurred the automatic excommunication, having acted under pressure to save her daughter's life, seeing that canon 1324, as mentioned above, states that automatic censures do not apply to those who act out of grave fear. They also said that there were no grounds for declaring excommunicated any of the doctors who performed the abortion, because this depended on the degree of awareness of each of them, and only such as were "aware and contumacious" were excommunicated.

While at both national and international level the Catholic Church declared that there were no grounds for considering anyone excommunicated in this case, the United Nations Committee on the Rights of the Child, in its January 2014 assessment of the Holy See's compliance with the U.N. Convention on the Rights of the Child, cited it and "urge[d] the Holy See to review its position on abortion which places obvious risks on the life and health of pregnant girls and to amend Canon 1398 relating to abortion with a view to identifying circumstances under which access to abortion services can be permitted".

== Eastern Catholicism ==
In the Code of Canons of the Eastern Churches (CCEC) for the Eastern Catholic Churches, the legislations concerning abortion equivalent to canon 1397 §2, are canons 728 §2 and 1450 §2. In the CCEC, the excommunication for abortion is not automatic, and the decision on whether to excommunicate or not those who have performed abortion is up to the local bishop.

== See also ==
- Excommunication of Margaret McBride
