= Latae sententiae and ferendae sententiae =

Ways sentences are imposed in the Catholic Church

Latae sententiae (Latin for 'of a judgment having been brought') and ferendae sententiae ('of a judgment having to be brought') are ways sentences are imposed in the Catholic Church in its canon law.

A latae sententiae penalty is a penalty the liability for which is imposed ipso facto, automatically, by force of the law itself, at the very moment a law is contravened; the fact that the offender is subject to the penalty is thus axiomatic. A ferendae sententiae penalty is a penalty that is imposed on a guilty party only after a case has been brought and decided by an authority in the Church.

The 1983 Code of Canon Law, which binds Catholics of the Latin Church, inflicts latae sententiae censures for certain forbidden actions. However, the current canon law that binds members of the Eastern Catholic Churches, the Code of Canons of the Eastern Churches, does not include latae sententiae penalties.

The application of a latae sententiae penalty requires no intervention by a judge. It falls therefore mainly to individual faithful who, if they have committed a crime for which a latae sententiae penalty is envisaged, must conscientiously assess the existence of some mitigating circumstance.

== Penalties in the 1983 Code of Canon Law ==
The censures that the 1983 Code of Canon Law envisages are excommunication, interdict, and suspension. Excommunication prohibits participation in certain forms of liturgical worship and church governance. Interdict involves the same liturgical restrictions as excommunication, but does not affect participation in church governance. Suspension, which affects only members of the clergy, prohibits certain acts by a cleric, whether the acts are of a religious character deriving from his ordination ("acts of the power of orders") or are exercises of his power of governance or of rights and functions attached to the office he holds.

=== Latae sententiae sanctions ===
==== Latae sententiae excommunications ====
Unless the excusing circumstances outlined in canons 1321–1330 exist, the 1983 Code of Canon Law (significantly updated in 2021) imposes latae sententiae excommunication on the following:

- an apostate from the faith, a heretic, or a schismatic;
- a person who throws away the consecrated Eucharistic species or takes and retains them for a sacrilegious purpose;
- a person who uses physical force against the pope;
- a person who attempts to confer a holy order on a woman, and the woman who attempts to receive it;
- a priest who absolves an accomplice in a sin against the sixth commandment of the Decalogue;
- a confessor who directly violates the sacramental seal of confession;
- a bishop who ordains someone a bishop without a papal mandate, and the person who receives the ordination from him;
- a person who procures an abortion (can. 1397 §2);
- accomplices without whose assistance a violation of a law prescribing latae sententiae excommunication would not have been committed.

Legislation outside of the 1983 Code of Canon Law may also decree latae sententiae excommunication. An example is that governing papal elections, which applies it to persons who violate secrecy, or who interfere with the election by means such as simony or communicating the veto of a civil authority.

The ipso facto excommunication that applied before 1983 to Catholics who became members of Masonic associations was not maintained in the 1983 Code of Canon Law that came into force in that year. However, the Holy See has declared that membership remains forbidden and that "The faithful who enrol in Masonic associations are in a state of grave sin and may not receive Holy Communion".

==== Latae sententiae interdicts ====
Instances in which one incurs a latae sententiae interdict include the following:

- using physical force against a bishop
- attempting to preside at Eucharist, or giving sacramental absolution, when not a priest
- falsely denouncing a confessor for soliciting a penitent to sin against the commandment against adultery
- a perpetually professed religious who attempts marriage

An example of an interdict that is not latae sententiae but instead ferendae sententiae is that given in canon 1374 of the 1983 Code of Canon Law: "One who joins an association which plots against the Church is to be punished with a just penalty; one who promotes or moderates such an association, however, is to be punished with an interdict."

==== Latae sententiae suspensions ====
Automatic suspension applies to clerics (those who have been ordained at least to the diaconate) in the following cases:

- a cleric who uses physical violence against a bishop;
- a deacon who attempts to celebrate the sacrifice of the Mass; or a priest who, though not empowered to grant sacramental absolution, attempts to do so or hears sacramental confession (the empowerment or faculty in question is granted either by the law itself, for instance to those who hold certain offices, or by certain ecclesiastical superiors of the penitents and penitents in danger of death can be validly absolved even by a priest without the faculty to hear confessions, and even if a priest with the faculty is present);
- a cleric who celebrates a sacrament through simony;
- a cleric who has received ordination illicitly;
- a cleric who falsely denounces before a church superior a priest as having committed the delict of soliciting, in connection with confession, to a sexual sin.

Ferendae sententiae suspension (along with other punishments) is to be inflicted on any cleric who openly lives in violation of chastity and on any priest who "in the act, on the occasion, or under the pretext of confession" solicits a penitent to a sexual sin.

== Effects ==
If one commits an ecclesiastical offence for which a ferendae sententiae punishment is prescribed, the penalty takes effect only when imposed by the competent ecclesiastical authority. It can also happen that the ecclesiastical authority issues a declaration that a particular individual has in fact incurred a latae sententiae censure. In both these cases the effects are more severe than those of a merely automatic censure.

Those under interdict or excommunication of any kind are forbidden to receive the sacraments, including the Eucharist. If the excommunication has been imposed or declared, others are obliged to prevent the censured person from acting in a ministerial capacity in the liturgy or, if this proves impossible, to suspend the liturgical service; and the censured person is not to be admitted to Holy Communion (see canon 915).

== Remission ==
Apart from cases where remission of a censure is reserved to the Holy See, it is for the ordinary responsible for its infliction or, after he has been consulted or in extraordinary circumstances in which such consultation is not possible, the ordinary of the locality where the censured person is present to remit a declared or imposed censure established by law. However, an ordinary can remit a merely automatic censure for his subjects, wherever they are, and for anyone present in his territory or who committed the delict in his territory, and any bishop can remit merely automatic censures for anyone whose sacramental confession he is hearing.

If a penitent finds it burdensome to remain in grave sin for the duration of the time necessary for obtaining remission by the competent authority from an undeclared latae sententiae excommunication or interdict that excludes the penitent from the sacraments, the confessor may immediately remit the censure in the internal sacramental forum, while requiring the penitent to have recourse within one month to the competent authority.

Remission cannot be granted to someone who maintains contumacy, nor can it be denied to someone who withdraws from contumacy.

== See also ==
- Criticism of the Catholic Church
- Ipso facto
- Ipso jure
- Ordination of women and the Catholic Church
