= Lucius Ferraris =

Italian Franciscan canonist

Lucius Ferraris (18 April 1687 – 24 February 1763) was an Italian Franciscan canonist of the 18th century. He was born at Solero, near Alessandria in Northern Italy. He was also a professor, provincial of his order, and consultor of the Holy Office. It would seem he died before 1763.

== Works ==
He is the author of the Prompta Bibliotheca canonica, juridica, moralis, theologica, necnon ascetica, polemica, rubricistica, historica, a veritable encyclopedia of religious knowledge. The first edition of this work appeared at Bologna in 1746. A second edition, much enlarged, and a third were published by the author himself. The fourth edition, dating from 1763, seems to have been published after his death. This, like those which followed it, contains additions the author made to the second edition under the title of additiones auctoris, and also other supplements (additiones ex aliena manu) inserted in their respective places in the body of the work (and no longer in the appendix as in the former editions). The various editions thus differ from one another. Some of his work has been reproduced by Migne (Paris, 1861–1863).

An edition of the Prompta Bibliotheca was published at Rome in 1899 in eight volumes with a volume of supplements, edited by Gennaro Bucceroni.

== Sources ==
- Chiappini, Aniceto (1932). "FERRARIS, Lucio". Enciclopedia Italiana. Rome: Istituto dell'Enciclopedia Italiana.
