= Canon (canon law) =

Form of church law

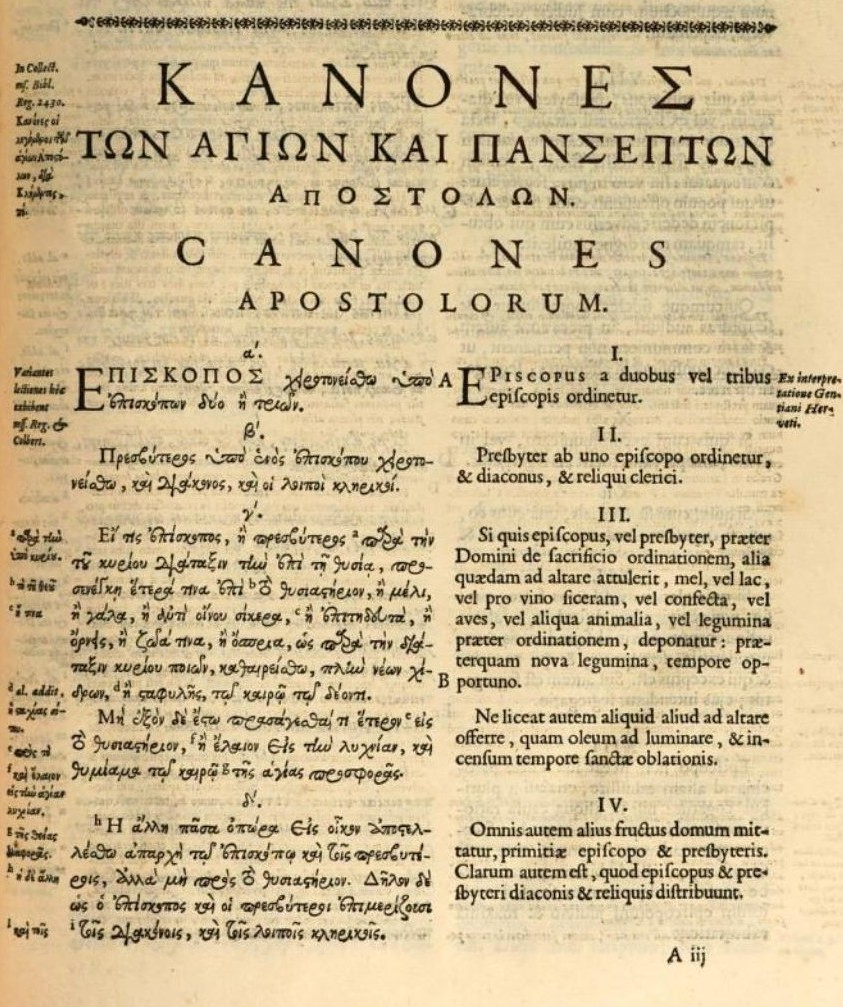
Canons 1 to 4 of the Apostolic Canons (Note: Translation: I. Let a bishop be ordained by two or three bishops. II. A presbyter by one bishop, as also a deacon, and the rest of the clergy. III. If any bishop or presbyter, otherwise than our Lord has ordained concerning the sacrifice, offer other things at the altar of God, as honey, milk, or strong beer instead of wine, any necessaries, or birds, or animals, or pulse, otherwise than is ordained, let him be deprived; excepting grains of new corn, or ears of wheat, or bunches of grapes in their season. For it is not lawful to offer anything besides these at the altar, and oil for the holy lamp, and incense in the time of the divine oblation. IV. But let all other fruits be sent to the house of the bishop, as first-fruits to him and to the presbyters, but not to the altar. Now it is plain that the bishop and presbyters are to divide them to the deacons and to the rest of the clergy.) (which are attributed by some to the Apostles) in Greek (left) and Latin (right) from a 1715 edition

In canon law, a canon designates some law promulgated by a synod, an ecumenical council, or an individual bishop.

The word "canon" comes from the Greek kanon, which in its original usage denoted a straight rod that was later the instrument used by architects and artificers as a measuring stick for making straight lines. Kanon eventually came to mean a rule or norm, so that when the first ecumenical council—Nicaea I—was held in 325, kanon started to obtain the restricted juridical denotation of a law promulgated by a synod or ecumenical council, as well as that of an individual bishop.

== Etymology ==
Greek kanon / Ancient Greek: κανών, Arabic Qanun / قانون, Hebrew kaneh / קנה, "straight"; a rule, code, standard, or measure; the root meaning in all these languages is "reed" (cf. the Romance-language ancestors of the English word "cane"). A kanon was the instrument used by architects and artificers for making straight lines.

== Pre-Nicene usage ==
Some writers think that the Church preferred the word canon to law, as the latter had a harsh meaning for the faithful in the times of persecution.

The early Fathers use canon as equivalent to the rule of faith, or for some formula expressing a binding obligation on Christians. (Note: Irenæus, Adv. Hær., I, ix; Tertullian, De Præscr., 13.)

Bickell declares that for the first three hundred years, canon is scarcely ever found for a separate and special decree of the Church; rather does it designate the rule of faith in general. He appeals to the fact that the plural form of the word is seldom used in the earliest Christian writers.

== Nicene and Medieval usage ==
With the fourth century began the use of canon for a disciplinary decree, owing to its employment in this sense by the First Council of Nicea (325 A.D.).

The Cassinese editors of Ferraris say that in the first ages of the Church many disciplinary regulations were not required, and hence it was scarcely necessary to discriminate decrees into dogmatic and disciplinary, as the faithful classed both under the obligation to observe the general rule of faith.

=== Canon vs. decretum ===
According to the Catholic Encyclopedia, from the fourth century onward, canon signified almost universally a disciplinary decree of a council or of the Roman Pontiffs.

The word decretum during the same period, though signifying in general an authoritative statute or decision, began to be limited more and more to dogmatic matters, while canon when used in opposition to it was restricted to laws of discipline. That this usage, however, was not invariable is evident from Gratian's use of "Decretum" to signify his collection of canons and decrees. (Note: Gratian himself entitled his work Concordantia discordantium canonum or "Concordance of Discordant Canons". Early Decretists gave to Gratian's codification the title of Decretum Gratiani.)

== Codifications ==
As ecclesiastical regulations began to multiply, it became necessary to gather them into codices, which generally received the title of "Collection of Canons". In these, civil laws are often added to the Church regulations. For such collections the Greeks used the term Nomocanones. The Latins have no special name for them, though the Capitularies, e. g. those of Charlemagne, are sometimes referred to as a somewhat parallel usage in the West.

=== Catholic Church ===
In 1917, the Catholic Church published the 1917 Code of Canon Law which applied to the Latin Church. In 1983, it published the a new Code of Canon Law for the Latin Church which replaced the 1917 Code of Canon Law.

During the reign of Pius XII, numerous canons for the Eastern Catholic Churches were published. In 1993, the Code of Canons of the Eastern Churches was published.

=== Eastern Orthodox Church ===
The Eastern Orthodox Church, principally through the work of 18th-century Athonite monastic scholar Nicodemus the Hagiorite, has compiled canons and commentaries upon them in a work known as the Pēdálion (Ancient Greek: Πηδάλιον, 'Rudder'), so named because it is meant to "steer" the Church in her discipline. The dogmatic determinations of the Councils are to be applied rigorously since they are considered to be essential for the Church's unity and the faithful preservation of the Gospel.

== Catholic Church ==
In Catholic canon law, a canon is a certain rule or norm of conduct or belief prescribed by the Catholic Church.

=== Tridentine usage ===
From the First Council of Nicea up to the beginning of the Council of Trent, the regulations concerning discipline issued by assemblies of bishops received the name of canons.

With the Council of Trent in the sixteenth century began the departure from this ancient usage. This council used the word canon for short, dogmatic definitions with an anathema attached to them. On the other hand, it gave the name of decrees to its disciplinary regulations. The example set by Trent was followed by the First Council of the Vatican.

The usage of Trent seems to bring canon nearer to the signification it bore before the First Council of Nicea, when it referred rather to faith than to discipline. The general idea of a decision by Church authority seems to be also the root-meaning of the expressions "Canon of Scripture", "Canon of the Mass", "Canon of Saints", although for the last term Ducange suggests a somewhat different origin.

=== Authority ===
As to the authority of ecclesiastical canons in the Catholic Church, a distinction is made when speaking of canons of faith and canons of discipline, for the former are irreversible, the latter are not. Similarly, canons containing a precept already binding by reason of Divine or natural law, cannot be on the same footing as those that are of mere ecclesiastical origin.

In general, the Corpus Juris Canonici declares (Note: Cf. cap. 1. de Const.) that canonical statutes are binding on all; likewise (Note: Corpus Juris Canonici, cap. Quum scimus) that bishops are the guardians of the canons and must see to their observance. When there is question of canons in the ordinary ecclesiastical sense (namely, that which obtained before the Council of Trent), as they refer principally to matters of discipline, it must be borne in mind that they are neither immutable nor irreformable.

The subject-matter of such canons depends not only on circumstances of persons, places, and times, but also on considerations of expediency or temporary necessity. A change in any of the causes which brought about the framing of the canons, will make a change in their binding force, for disciplinary regulations are almost necessarily mutable.

In like manner when there is question of the binding force of a canon, it is important to determine whether it was issued by a general council or by the decree of a pope, as imposing an obligation on all the faithful, or whether it was framed solely for restricted regions or persons. In the latter case its binding-force is as restricted as its scope.

=== Abrogation, obrogation, and custom ===
The Catholic Encyclopedia argues that the object which the Catholic Church has always had in view in promulgating her canons has been the guidance and preservation of the clergy and laity in the duties of a Christian life and in the best methods of ecclesiastical administration.

Although, therefore, such canons contain elements of positive human law, yet ultimately they are founded on the Divine or natural law. As such, they cannot be entirely abrogated by contrary custom, though their rigour may be mitigated by certain circumstances, on the ceasing of which, the pristine rigour of the canon would be again binding. When they are entirely of human law, they may, of course, be completely abrogated, not only by legislation on the part of the proper authorities, but also by legitimate custom.

William H. W. Fanning, in the 1913 Catholic Encyclopedia article states that:

The neglect of the prescriptions of the sacred canons has always been the source of corruption in morals, and perhaps the chief reason for the loss of faith by nations as well as by individuals.

According to Fanning, the study of the sacred canons is especially enjoined on the clergy. Fanning speculates that perhaps most of the regulations refer directly to ecclesiastics, and suggests that clergy will find in them the surest guidance for their own conduct and for the fruitful exercise of their ministry in directing the faithful.

== Eastern Orthodox Church ==
In Eastern Orthodox canon law, canons "are ecclesiastical norms issued by the Church through the collective voice of the bishops gathered in ecumenical or local synods, speaking through the inspiration of the Holy Spirit and in agreement with Christ's teaching and the dogmas of the Church. In addition, the Fathers of the Church issued canons or wrote letters that eventually came to be considered entirely or partially canonical. [....] A special place in Canon Law is given to the [eighty-five] Canons of the Holy Apostles, attributed to the Apostles and collected in different works."

== Episcopal Church (USA) ==
In the Episcopal Church (USA), canons in canon law are "the written rules that provide a code of laws for the governance of the church. The canons of the Episcopal Church are enacted by the General Convention. Canons of the Episcopal Church may only be enacted, amended, or repealed by concurrent resolution of the House of Deputies and the House of Bishops at General Convention."

== See also ==
- Canon law
- Canon law (Catholic Church)
- Canon 844
- Canons of Edgar
- Canon 915
- Canon 1324
- Canon 1397 §2
