= Code of Canons of the Eastern Churches =

Eastern Catholic code of canon law

The Code of Canons of the Eastern Churches (CCEC; Latin: Codex Canonum Ecclesiarum Orientalium, abbreviated CCEO) is the title of the 1990 work which is a codification of the common portions of the canon law for the 23 Eastern Catholic Churches in the Catholic Church. It is divided into 30 titles and has a total of 1546 canons. The code entered into force in 1991.

The western Latin Church is governed by its own particular code, the 1983 Code of Canon Law.

== History ==
The 23 sui iuris Churches which collectively make up the Eastern Catholic Churches had been invited by the Holy See to codify their own particular laws and submit them to the pope so that there may be a full, complete code of all religious law within Eastern Catholicism. Pope John Paul II promulgated the Code of Canons of the Eastern Churches on 18 October 1990, by the document Sacri Canones. The code came into force on 1 October 1991.

== Language ==
The official language of the canon law common to all the Eastern Catholic Churches (called "common law" (Note: This usage should not be confused with the common law civil legal system or with the jus commune.)) is Latin. Although Latin is the language of the Latin Church and not of the Eastern Churches, Latin was chosen as the language of the common law because there is no common language in use among all the Eastern Catholic Churches. The members of these churches use a diversity of languages, including Greek, Ukrainian, Arabic, Romanian, Malayalam, English, French, Spanish, and Portuguese, but no single one of these languages could be used as the language of the common law. Latin was chosen because it has a long history of legal and juridical tradition and was suitable for serving as the common text from which translations could be made.

== Emendations ==
=== Ad Tuendam Fidem ===
In 1998, Pope John Paul II issued the motu proprio Ad Tuendam Fidem, which amended two canons (750 and 1371) of the 1983 Code of Canon Law and two canons (598 and 1436) of the Code of Canons of the Eastern Churches, so as to add "new norms which expressly impose the obligation of upholding truths proposed in a definitive way by the Magisterium of the Church, and which also establish related canonical sanctions".

=== Mitis et Misericors Iesus ===
On 15 August 2015, Pope Francis issued the motu proprio Mitis et Misericors Iesus which amended canons 1357 to 1377 of the CCEO. It reformed the procedures for matrimonial nullity trials and instituted a briefer process.

=== Competentias quasdam decernere ===
The motu proprio Competentias quasdam decernere issued 15 February 2022 changed canons 489, 496, 499, 501, 552. 546, 1052, and 1054.

=== Vocare peccatores ===
On 5 April 2023, Pope Francis released the apostolic letter, issued motu proprio, Vocare peccatores. It was signed 20 March 2023, and came into force on 29 June 2023.

It changes 23 canons: canons 1402, 1406, 1407, 1409, 1410, 1414, 1416, 1424, 1429, 1430, 1436, 1442, 1443, 1446, 1449, 1453, 1456, 1459, 1463, 1464, 1466, 1467, and 1152.

=== Iam pridem ===
On 17 April 2023, Pope Francis released the apostolic letter, issued motu proprio, Iam pridem. It had been signed on 16 April 2023. The new legislation made it so that Eastern Catholics who are at the age of 80 or more cannot take part in votings of their Synods. Iam pridem states the new legislation does not concern "Patriarchs, Major Archbishops, Eparchial Bishops and Exarchs" who are currently in office "despite them having reached the age of eighty". The new legislation is to enter into force one month after it is published.

It changes canons 66 § 1, as well as canons 102, 149 and 183.

=== Mutua concordia ===
On 29 August 2026, Pope Leo XIV published a motu proprio titled Mutua concordia to amend canons 106 and 126 to grant the Eastern Churches the ability to remove their respective Patriarchs from office. Leo XIV ordered that a new paragraph, 106 § 3, be inserted to specify that "should the Patriarch fail to fulfil the obligations" outlaid in the Code, "the Synod of Bishops of the patriarchal Church may be lawfully convoked by the Bishop ..." thus that its Archbishops, bishops, and so on may initiate the motion. The Pontiff also modified Canon 126 with a new paragraph stipulating that "for a grave cause recognized as such ... that same Synod may request the Patriarch to resign from office". Canon 126 § 4 states the vote to submit the removal of a Patriarch must be achieved through a two-thirds vote, and the Pontiff must give "his assent to the removal".

== Division ==
The text of the CCEO is divided into 31 sections, 30 titles and a section of preliminary canons.

=== Preliminary canons ===
The six preliminary canons deal with scope and continuity, what is affected by the CCEO and how prior legislation and customs shall be handled.

Can. 1 The CCEO regards solely the Eastern Catholic Churches unless otherwise mentioned.

Can. 2 The CCEO is to be assessed according to the Ancient Laws of the Eastern Churches.

Can. 3 The CCEO does not "for the most part legislate on liturgical matters" and therefore the liturgical books are to be observed unless contrary to the canons of the CCEO.

Can. 4. The CCEO neither degrades or abrogates treaties/pacts entered into by the Holy See with nations and political societies. Therefore, they still have their force, notwithstanding any prescriptions of the CCEO to the contrary.

== Churches sui iuris and rites ==
A church sui iuris is "a community of the Christian faithful, which is joined together by a hierarchy according to the norm of law and which is expressly or tacitly recognized as sui iuris by the supreme authority of the Church" (CCEO, can. 27). The term sui iuris is an innovation of the CCEO, and denotes the relative autonomy of the Eastern Catholic Churches. This canonical term, pregnant with many juridical nuances, indicates the God-given mission of the Eastern Catholic Churches to preserve their patrimonial autonomous nature. The autonomy of these churches is relative in the sense that they are under the authority of the Bishop of Rome. (Note: For a better understanding of the concept of church sui iuris see, Žužek, Understanding The Eastern Code, pp. 94–109.)

== See also ==
- Canon law (Catholic Church)
- 1983 Code of Canon Law
- 1917 Code of Canon Law
- Roman Catholic (term)

== Bibliography ==
- Faris, John D., & Jobe Abbass, OFM Conv., eds. A Practical Commentary to the Code of Canons of the Eastern Churches, 2 vols. Montréal: Librairie Wilson & Lafleur, 2019.
