= Jurisprudence of Catholic canon law =

Legal theory, traditions and interpretative principles of Catholic canon law

The jurisprudence of Catholic canon law is the complex of legal theory, traditions, and interpretative principles of Catholic canon law. In the Latin Church, the jurisprudence of canon law was founded by Gratian in the 1140s with his Decretum. In the Eastern Catholic canon law of the Eastern Catholic Churches, Photios holds a place similar to that of Gratian for the West.

Much of the legislative style was adapted from that of Roman law, especially the Justinianic Corpus Juris Civilis. As a result, Roman ecclesiastical courts tend to follow the Roman law style of continental Europe with some variation. After the fall of the Roman Empire and up until the revival of Roman law in the 11th century, canon law served as the most important unifying force among the local systems in the civil law tradition. The canonists introduced into post-Roman Europe the concept of a higher law of ultimate justice, over and above the momentary law of the state.

The Catholic Church developed the inquisitorial system in the Middle Ages. This judicial system features collegiate panels of judges and an investigative form of proceeding, in contradistinction to the adversarial system found in the common law of England and many of her former colonies, which utilises concepts such as juries and single judges.

The institutions and practices of canon law paralleled the legal development of much of Europe, and consequently both modern civil law and common law (canon law having a significant effect upon the development of the system of equity in England) bear the influences of canon law. For example, discovery in common law jurisdictions came about in part because of the influence of canon law on courts of equity.

== Sources of law ==
The term source or fountain of canon law (fons juris canonici) may be taken in a twofold sense. First, it can indicate the formal cause of the existence of a law (fontes essendi), such as canon law or lawgivers. Second, it can describe the material channel through which laws are handed down and made known (fontes cognoscendi), such as sources of history.

=== Fontes essendi ===
The fontes essendi (Latin: "sources of being") include the following legislators:

- Jesus Christ, whom the Catholic Church believes to be her divine founder, is the original source of divine laws laid down chiefly in the Constitution of the Church, and next to Him the Apostles as lawgivers either of divine or human laws, viz.: as inspired or merely human instruments.
- The Roman Pontiff, either alone or in unison with a general council, as endowed with the supreme and ordinary power of enacting laws for the universal church.
- The Bishops for their respective particular churches, unless competency is reserved to another authority, such as the bishops' conference or the Holy See.

Customs, too, must be considered as a source of law, universal as well as particular.

Whether the natural law can be called a source of canon law depends on the formal declaration of the supreme authority and through determinationes; for the natural law as such—its extent is very uncertain—cannot be called a homogeneous source of canon law except it has been declared such by the highest authority. (Note: J. Laurentius, Institutiones Juris Bed., 1903, p. 9; that the natural law should be cautiously used in Canon Law. Schenkl, I. c- t 37, remarks) Besides its range being very uncertain, the natural law is an objective sentiment, or a dictate of reason.

=== Fontes cognoscendi ===
The fontes cognoscendi (Latin: "sources of knowing") are depositaries collecting the laws enacted in the course of centuries. They may also be considered as the channels through which the river and rivulets of legal enactment flow and are preserved. They do not constitute the law as such, but rather point out where it may be found. Among these sources are Holy Scripture and the decrees of popes and councils; also, in a measure, custom, inasmuch, namely, as it proves the existence and continuity of laws unwritten and perhaps forgotten.

=== Jus vigens ===
The term jus vigens (Latin: "living law") means all the currently-in-effect laws of the church, primarily the 1983 Code of Canon Law, the Code of Canons of the Eastern Churches, and Praedicate evangelium.

In the apostolic constitution Sacri Canones, by means of which he promulgated the Code of Canons of the Eastern Churches, Pope John Paul II stated

By the publication of this Code, the canonical ordering of the whole Church is thus at length completed, following as it does [...] the "Apostolic Constitution on the Roman Curia" of 1988, which is added to both Codes as the primary instrument of the Roman Pontiff for 'the communion that binds together, as it were, the whole Church'

Other sources include apostolic constitutions, motibus propriis, and particular law.

=== Custom ===
Custom in Catholic canon law is the repeated and constant performance of certain acts for a defined period of time, which, with the approval of the competent legislator, thereby acquire the force of law. A custom is, in other words, an unwritten law introduced by the continuous acts of the faithful with the consent of the legitimate legislator.

Custom may be considered as a fact and as a law. As a fact, it is simply the frequent and free repetition of acts concerning the same thing; as a law, it is the result and consequence of that fact. Hence its name, which is derived from consuesco or consuefacio and denotes the frequency of the action. (Note: (Cap. Consuetudo v, Dist. I.))

In order for custom to become a source of law, it must be approved by the competent legislator. Custom in canon law is not simply created by the people through their constant performance of a certain act, but it is the constant performance of a certain act with the intention of making a custom, which is approved by the competent legislator, thereby acquiring the force of law. This is because of the Catholic ecclesiological teaching on the constitution of the Catholic Church, which states that Christ constituted the Church by divine delegation of power to the hierarchical authorities; the Church was not created by the consent of the governed, but by the direct will of Christ.

=== Decrees ===
A decree (Latin: decretum, from decerno, "I judge") is, in a general sense, an order or law made by a superior authority for the direction of others. In the usage of the canon law of the Catholic Church, it has various meanings. Any papal bull, brief, or motu proprio is a decree inasmuch as these documents are legislative acts of the pope. In this sense the term is quite ancient. (Note: Pope Siricius speaks (Ep. i, ad Himer., c. ii) of the decreta generalia of Pope Liberius.) The Roman Congregations were formerly empowered to issue decrees in matters which come under their particular jurisdiction, but were forbidden from continuing to do so under Pope Benedict XV in 1917. Each ecclesiastical province, and also each diocese, may issue decrees in their periodical synods within their sphere of authority.

=== Motu proprio ===
A motu proprio is a document issued by the pope on his own initiative and personally signed by him. A motu proprio may be addressed to the whole Church, to part of it, or to some individuals. A document issued motu proprio has its legal effect even if the reasons given for its issuance are found to be false or fraudulent, a fact which would normally render the document invalid. Its validity is based on its issuance by the pope by his own initiative, not upon the reasons alleged.

The first motu proprio was promulgated by Pope Innocent VIII in 1484. It continues to be a common form of papal rescripts, especially when establishing institutions, making minor changes to law or procedure, and when granting favours to persons or institutions.

=== Apostolic constitutions ===
An apostolic constitution is the highest level of decree issued by the pope. The use of the term constitution comes from Latin constitutio, which referred to any important law issued by the Roman emperor, and is retained in church documents because of the inheritance that canon law received from Roman law.

By their nature, apostolic constitutions are addressed to the public. Generic constitutions use the title apostolic constitution, and treat on solemn matters of the church, such as the promulgation of laws or definitive teachings. The forms dogmatic constitution and pastoral constitution are titles sometimes used to be more descriptive as to the document's purpose. Apostolic constitutions are issued as papal bulls because of their solemn, public form.

== Language of canon law ==
=== Translation of Latin originals ===
In general, the Holy See does not give its assent to translations of the Latin originals (so-called "'authentic' translations"); the Holy See is content to publish the Latin alone, as Latin is the official language of canon law.

=== Lex and jus ===
Canon law incorporates two main terms that are translated in English as "law": lex and jus or ius. Various canonical texts use one or both of the terms in varying contexts.

==== Lex ====
Lex is Latin for one sense of the English term law. In the canon law of the Catholic Church, lex refers to law which has been formulated in written form and promulgated by competent authority. While this is the usual sense of "law" in modern legal systems, the legal system of the Catholic Church distinguishes this from jus, which refers to the oral teachings, practices, customs, theological understandings of liturgy, and liturgical practices generally prior to the Council of Nicea in AD 325, when written legislation became the normative means of communicating Church law.

Lex takes several forms:

- Decrees or canons of ecumenical councils.
- Decrees or canons of regional Church councils or synods (regionally binding)
- Decrees (or decretals) of the Pope.
- Canon law (binding either universally or by rite)

==== Jus ====
Jus or ius, the source of the English term "justice", can be translated as "law" as well but, in the canon law of the Catholic Church, it refers specifically to custom, practice, or "Tradition" as opposed to formal written enactments (lex).

Much Church legislation, unless otherwise stated, is the development or restatement of earlier law, with particular focus given to the oral tradition from apostolic teaching. The Early Church, which existed under varying degrees of persecution in the Roman Empire prior to Constantine I in the early fourth century, was not in a position to gather large councils for the purpose of legislation or theological clarification prior to the First Council of Nicaea in 325. Thus, its early law was largely unwritten, but instead existed in the practices, customs, and teachings of the early Christian community. An oral tradition was passed from the apostles to the bishops, and from bishops and priests to the faithful through their preaching and way of life. Some of what is included in the term jus would be interpretations of particular scriptural passages, theological understandings of the liturgy, and liturgical practices themselves. Evidence for the content of this oral tradition of teaching is found among the writings of the Early Church Fathers as well as in the later formal legislation of the Church. Laws formalized as lex after 325 are sometimes interpreted as having "new" content but this was not usually the case. Most Church legislation is either a development of prior teaching or practice or re-affirmation of teaching or practice, unless otherwise expressly stated.

== Principles of law ==
=== Dispensation ===
In the canon law of the Roman Catholic Church, a dispensation is the exemption from the immediate obligation of law in certain cases. Its object is to modify the hardship often arising from the rigorous application of general laws to particular cases, and its essence is to preserve the law by suspending its operation in such cases. Since laws aimed at the good of the entire community may not be suitable for certain cases or persons, the legislator has the right (sometimes even the duty) to dispense from (Note: The expression "dispense from" used for exemptions in canon law is distinct from the more common "dispense with".) the law. Dispensation is not a permanent power or a special right as in privilege. If the reason for the dispensation ceases entirely, then the dispensation also ceases entirely. If the immediate basis for the right is withdrawn, then the right ceases.

In canonical jurisprudence, the dispensing power is the corollary of the legislative. In the decretal Proposuit, Innocent III proclaimed that the pope could, if circumstances demanded, dispense from canon law, de jure, with his plenitude of power, basing his view on the principle princeps legibus solutus est (the prince is not bound by the laws). The power of dispensing lies with the original lawgiver, with his successors or with his superiors, and with those persons to whom they have delegated this right. Such a dispensation is not, strictly speaking, legislative, but rather a judicial, quasi-judicial or executive act. It is also, of course, subject to the proviso that his jurisdiction to dispense with laws was limited to those laws which were within his jurisdiction or competence. Since there is no superior above the pope, he can therefore dispense from all canonical laws: universal laws introduced by himself, his predecessors or general councils, and particular laws enacted by plenary and provincial councils, bishops and similar prelates. The pope can dispense from canon law in all cases that are not contrary to Divine law—except in the case of vows, espousals and marriages ratum sed non consummatum, or valid and consummated marriages of neophytes before baptism. In doubtful cases, however, he may decide authoritatively as to the objective value of the doubt. As a general rule the pope delegates his powers to the various congregations of the Roman Curia which are charged with granting dispensations in matters within the sphere of their competence.

There must be a "just and reasonable cause" for granting a dispensation. The judgement regarding what is "just and reasonable" is made based upon the particular situation and the importance of the law to be dispensed from. If the cause is not "just and reasonable" then the dispensation is illegal and, if issued by someone other than the lawgiver of the law in question or his superior, it is also invalid. If it is uncertain as to whether a sufficiently "just and reasonable cause" exists, the dispensation is both legal and valid. Some clauses of the dispensation rescript can constitute conditions sine quâ non for the validity of the dispensation.

=== Matrimonial dispensation ===
A matrimonial dispensation is the relaxation in a particular case of an impediment prohibiting or annulling a marriage. Matrimonial dispensations can be either to allow a marriage in the first place, or to dissolve one. It may be granted: (a) in favour of a contemplated marriage or to legitimize one already contracted; (b) in secret cases, or in public cases, or in both; (c) in foro interno only, or in foro externo (the latter includes also the former). Power of dispensing in foro interno is not always restricted to secret cases (casus occulti). These expressions are by no means identical. When a matrimonial impediment is common to both parties the bishop, in dispensing his own subject, dispenses also the other.

By virtue of his power of jurisdiction, (Note: The 1913 Catholic Encyclopedia original text says "By virtue of their [diocesan bishops] ordinary power (Jurisdiction)". Canon law has traditionally distinguished between the "Power of Order" and the "Power of Jurisdiction".) a bishop can dispense from those prohibent impediments of ecclesiastical law which are not reserved to the pope, and even from such reserved impediments under certain conditions. He may also, under certain conditions, dispense from diriment impediments.

Sufficient causes for matrimonial dispensations are divided into canonical causes, i. e. classified and held as sufficient by the common law and canonical jurisprudence, and reasonable causes, i.e. not provided for nominally in the law, but deserving of equitable consideration in view of circumstances or particular cases.

=== Promulgation ===
Promulgation is the act by which the legislator manifests to those subject to his jurisdiction the decision that he has made and makes known to them his intention to bind them to the observance of his law. Without having been promulgated, the canonical law in question has no legal effect, since promulgation is "an essential factor of legislation" and "an absolute condition for the effectiveness of a law". Philosophically it is a matter of dispute whether promulgation is of the essence of a law. (Note: The nature of promulgation in its relation to the nature of canon law is a matter of discussion among canonical writers. Some canonists hold that promulgation as such "enters the very essence of the law", (Abbo & Hannan, The Sacred Canons Vol. I, pg. 16) while Abbo & Hannan hold what they assert to be "the more probable opinion that promulgation is merely an extrinsic essential condition sine qua non."(The Sacred Canons Vol. I, pg. 16)) It seems indisputable that the essential element of a law is the will of the legislator, but it is clear that the legislator should make known his will and intention in one way or another. This manifestation is the promulgation of the law, which is not necessarily distinct from the very elaboration of the law, provided that this takes place by external acts. Once promulgation takes place, a canonical law acquires its last "essential condition" and takes immediate effect, subject to the vacatio legis imposed by universal law, or by the particular legislator issuing a law (see section below). Promulgation is a "formal and fundamental element" of canon law. For the purposes of canonical jurisprudence, promulgation is equivalent to publication, although the promulgation of a law must not be confounded with its publication, the object of the first being to make known the will of the legislator, of the second to spread the knowledge of legislative enactments among subjects bound to observe them.

=== Revocation ===
The act of recalling or annulling, the reversal of an act, the recalling of a grant, or the making void of some deed previously existing. This term is of wide application in canon law. Grants, laws, contracts, sentences, jurisdiction, appointments are at times revoked by the grantor, his successor or superior according to the prescriptions of law. Revocation without just cause is illicit, though often valid. Laws and customs are revoked when, owing to change of circumstances, they cease to be just and reasonable. Concordats (q.v.) are revocable when they redound to the serious injury of the Church. Minors and ecclesiastical institutions may have sentences in certain civil trials set aside (Restitutio in integrum). Contracts by which ecclesiastical property is alienated are sometimes rescindable. A judge may revoke his own interlocutory sentence but not a definitive judicial sentence. Many appointments are revocable at will; others require a judicial trial or other formalities.

=== Vacatio legis ===
In principle, a law becomes binding from the time of its promulgation. But because there are often reasons that the immediate efficacy of a law would be detrimental to those upon whom it enjoins, the legislator often orders a delay—vacatio—in the law's applicability. In Latin canon law, the vacatio legis is three calendar months after promulgation for universal laws, and one calendar month after promulgation for particular laws, unless the law itself establishes a longer or shorter period of time. The legislator of the law can stipulate a longer or shorter time of vacatio than that which is stipulated generally.

=== Valid but illicit ===
The term "valid but illicit" (or "valid but illegal") refers to an unauthorized celebration of a sacrament or the placement of a juridic act which does not follow non-essential things commanded by the law, but that nevertheless has effect. While validity is presumed whenever an act is placed "by a qualified person and includes those things which essentially constitute the act itself as well as the formalities and requirements imposed by law for the validity of the act", Roman Catholic canon law also lays down rules for lawful placing of the act.

== Principles of legal interpretation ==
Canonists have formulated interpretive rules for the proper interpretation of canonical laws. An authentic interpretation is an official interpretation of a statute issued by the statute's legislator. An authentic interpretation has the force of law.

=== Authentic interpretation ===
Besides the Pope, who has plenary legislative power, there are several other legislative authorities in the Roman Catholic Church with varying degrees of particular legislative power. Primary examples are diocesan bishops and their equivalents, episcopal conferences, and particular councils. Any of these legislators can issue authentic interpretations of their laws and their predecessor's laws. Legislators also can entrust the power to authentically interpret their own laws to someone else. For the 1983 Code of Canon Law, the Code of Canons of the Eastern Churches, and other papal laws, the pope has delegated the authority to issue authentic interpretations to the Pontifical Council for Legislative Texts.

=== Magisterial interpretation ===
When it is not possible for a law to be authentically interpreted, recourse must be had to what is called magisterial, or doctrinal, interpretation, for which rules of law have been formulated. The words of a law must be understood according to their usual signification, unless it is certain that the legislator intended them to be taken in another sense, or the rules of law dictate another interpretation. In all interpretations, however, the meaning of the words is to be preferred which favours equity rather than strict justice. The provisions of a previous statute are not presumed to be changed beyond the express meaning of the words of a new law. No words of a law are ever presumed to be superfluous. In interpreting a law the words must be considered in their context. When the words of a law are doubtful the presumption is in favour of the subjects, not of the lawgiver.

=== Derogation ===
Derogation is the partial suppression of a law, as opposed to abrogation—total abolition of a law by explicit repeal—and obrogation—the partial or total modification or repeal of a law by the imposition of a later and contrary one. Derogation differs from dispensation in that it affects everyone, whereas dispensation applies to specific people affected by the law.

=== Obrogation ===
Obrogation is a term in the jurisprudence of canon law that refers to the enacting of a contrary law that is a revocation of a previous law. It may also be the partial cancellation or amendment of a law, decree, or legal regulation by the imposition of a newer one. Obrogation should not be confused with abrogation, which is the explicit repeal of a law, in whole or in part.

=== Computation of time ===
Months are computed according to the calendar from the date of publication. A "canonical month" (in contradistinction to a "calendar month") is a period of 30 days, while a "calendar month" is a continuous month. As stated above, a standard vacatio legis is now computed according to calendar months rather than by canonical months. For example, if a law is promulgated on 2 November and the vacatio legis is 3 months, then the law takes effect after 92 days on 2 February. If the law were specifically enacted to use canonical months instead, it would take effect after 90 days on 31 January.

== See also ==
- Appeal as from an abuse, forum shopping between canon and civil jurisdictions
