= Man-made law =

Law defined by humans

Man-made law is law that is made by humans, usually considered in opposition to concepts like natural law or divine law.

The European and American conception of man-made law has changed radically in the period from the Middle Ages to the present day. In the Thomistic view dominant in the Medieval period, man-made law is the lowest form of law, as a determinatio of natural law or divine positive law. In the view dominant in the modern period, man-made law is thought of as primary because it is man-made. The Soviet Union went further, not recognizing any such thing as divine or natural law. In several Islamic countries, man-made law is still considered to be subordinate to divine law.

== Philosophical concepts ==
=== In Hegelianism ===
Professor Heinz Mohnhaupt of the Max Planck Institute for European History of Law relates man-made law to Hegel's concept of Rechtsgesetze or "Laws of Right", which Hegel placed in opposition to the Naturgesetz or laws of nature. In the Hegelian view, according to Mohnhaupt, man made law is Rechtsgesetze, or at least a subset thereof. Its characteristics are that it is "not absolute", and is created by human beings "above all" for the regulation of their actions and behaviour (but also for the ordering of things). It "has to be generally known" and "has to take into account [both] its anthropological determination and [...] its chronological determination". Man-made law is fluid, changing over time in order to adapt to changing real-world circumstances.

=== In the writing of Thomas Aquinas ===
Thomas Aquinas expounded the concept of Human Law, a distinct form of law alongside Natural Law and Eternal Law, in Summa Theologica. Thomas asserted the primacy of natural law over man-made law, stating that where it "is at variance with natural law it will not be a law, but spoilt law" (ST, I–II q. 95 a. 2). The result of any such conflict is that the man-made law does "not oblige in the court of conscience" (ST, I–II q. 95 a. 4), since human law is a determinatio of divine or natural law, and a lower law cannot contradict a higher law. Natural law theorists and others have thusly challenged many man-made laws over the years, on the grounds that they conflict with what the challengers assert to be natural, or divine, laws.

==== Lex humana versus lex posita ====
Thomas Aquinas himself conflated man-made law (lex humana) and positive law (lex posita or ius positiva). However, there is a subtle distinction between them. Positive law regards law from the position of its legitimacy. Positive law is law by the will of whoever made it, and thus there can equally be divine positive law as there is man-made positive law. (More literally translated, lex posita is posited rather than positive law.) In the Summa contra Gentiles Thomas himself writes of divine positive law where he says "Si autem lex sit divinitus posita, auctoritate divina dispensatio fieri potest (If the law be divinely given, dispensation can be granted by divine authority)" and "Lex autem a Deo posita est (But the Law was established by God)". Martin Luther also acknowledged the idea of divine positive law, as did Juan de Torquemada.

The Thomistic concept of man-made law, by contrast, regards law from a different angle. It treats it from the position of its origins. Lex humana or sometimes lex humanitus posita (as is the case throughout ST, q. 95), but sometimes rather lex ab hominibus inventa (as is the case in ST, q. 91.3), is law made by man, rather than made by the divine (lex divina). What is important about lex humana is not that it is posited by someone, but that the someone who posits it is human rather than divine.

== Historical change: from lowest rank to supreme law ==
The European and American conception of man-made law has changed radically in the period from the Middle Ages to the present day. In the Thomist view of the Middle Ages, man-made law was the lowest form of law. Above it were the lex naturalis, the lex divina, and the lex aeterna. Man-made law only had authority in as much as it expressed and concurred with higher laws.

Over the centuries, this idea has been turned on its head. Rather than being a lesser law because it is made by man rather than by the divine, modern conceptions of man-made law rank it as fundamental and supreme law because it is man-made, thanks to the notion of the sovereignty of the people that saw expression in events such as the American Revolution and French Revolution of the 18th century.

Legal theory in the Soviet Union went further, not recognizing any such thing as divine or natural law, and considering the state to be sovereign. Only man-made law, as made by the state, existed according to Marxist legal theory.

Although laws higher than the man-made law of the sovereign people are not formally recognized in the legal theories of countries such as the United States, the Thomist idea of man-made law being subordinate to divine law is still espoused by many people in those countries. For example: Martin Luther King Jr., in his Letter from Birmingham Jail cited Thomas Aquinas in his ways to know that a law is unjust:

"A just law is a man made code that squares with the moral law or the law of God. An unjust law is a code that is out of harmony with the moral law. To put it in the terms of St. Thomas Aquinas: An unjust law is a human law that is not rooted in eternal law and natural law."

— King 1963

In several Islamic countries, man-made law is still, in 20th and 21st century legal theory, considered to be subordinate to divine law, in the form of the sharia. In that legal theory, the sovereign power is Allah, not the people, and God-made law takes precedence over man-made law. (The full legal position of sharia is complex, varies from country to country, and is considered differently by various groups. For a wider discussion see the sharia article.)

== See also ==
- Popular sovereignty
- Positive law
- Render unto Caesar
