= Derogation =

Partial suppression of a law

Derogation is a legal term of art, which allows for part or all of a provision in a legal measure to be applied differently, or not at all, in certain cases. The term is also used in Catholic canon law, and in this context differs from dispensation in that it applies to the law, whereas dispensation applies to specific people affected by the law.

== Definitions ==
Black's Law Dictionary defines derogation as "the partial repeal or abolishing of a law, as by a subsequent act which limits its scope or impairs its utility and force". It is sometimes used, loosely, to mean abrogation, as in the legal maxim lex posterior derogat priori ("a subsequent law derogates the previous one").

According to West's Encyclopedia of American Law, derogation "implies the taking away of only some part of a law", or it is a "partial repeal of a law, usually by a subsequent act that in some way diminishes its original intent or scope", so distinguished from annulment, defined as the destruction of the law by "an act of the legislative power, by constitutional authority, or by usage". Black's also distinguishes from what it calls "abrogation, which means the entire repeal and annulment of a law".

In the law of treaties, derogation means the setting aside of some provision or requirement of the treaty. The party to the treaty is said to have "derogated from" that provision.

In human rights law, the term may carry the additional meaning of a national legislature suspending an obligation for a legitimate objective, usually a national security exception or some other extraordinary circumstance relating to the maintenance of public order.

== History ==
=== Jura regalia ===
In the conflict between English common law and ecclesiastical courts, both existed as legal systems of equal validity in one geographic space. By the mid 14th century the English Parliament had attempted to limit ecclesiastical jurisdiction with the Statute of Praemunire. Based on the legislation, litigants in ecclesiastical courts argued that canon law, under the authority of Rome, was a derogation of the rights of the English crown, and argued for damages and criminal penalties under that statute.

After the Reformation, appealing to the Roman (or "spiritual") jurisdiction was considered punishable as an offence in derogation of the king's authority. Edward Coke argued that derogating from the common law was the same as diminishing the authority of the King. According to Coke, the royal power had been undermined by the ecclesiastical jurisdiction: "the pope had usurped spiritual jurisdiction of this realm in derogation of the imperial crown of the king." Coke defended royal supremacy in De Iure Regis Ecclesiastico in a historical commentary of the common law's protection of royal authority against papal subversion.

=== Common law ===
There is a legal maxim: Statutes in derogation of the common law are to be strictly construed. This is also called the "derogation canon". After the American Civil War legislation started to become more important, and some people saw common law as a way of expanding and discovering new rights under the Due Process Clause jurisprudence. Others thought that legislative statutes that changed common law ought to be narrowly interpreted without expansion, as the derogation canon suggested. This became a source of political conflict. Henry Campbell Black (of Black's Law Dictionary) wrote:

It is a rule generally observed (except where prohibited by statute) that acts of the legislature made in derogation of the common law will not be extended by construction; that is, the legislature will not be presumed to intend innovations upon the common law, and its enactments will not be extended, in directions contrary to the common law, further than is indicated by the express terms of the law or by fair and reasonable implications from its nature or purpose or the language employed.

However, Black wrote that the canon "no longer has any foundation in reason". Theodore Sedgwick said of common law: "It is difficult, if not impossible now to understand this enthusiastic loyalty to a body of law, the most peculiar features of which the activity of the present generation have been largely occupied in uprooting and destroying." Sedgwick too called the derogation canon "absurd".

In 1907 Roscoe Pound, in an article called "Spurious Interpretation", argued that the derogation canon had become a cover for judicial hostility towards legislation, and called into question the legitimacy of judicial fidelity to some pre-existing and conflicted common law precepts.

== Treaties ==
Derogation clauses are common in modern treaties. They are often included in human rights treaties, as well as treaties on matters related to trade. Some treaties expressly disallow derogations, related to the idea of jus cogens, or international norms from which derogation is considered unjustifiable in any circumstances. One such example is the Convention Against Torture, of which Article 2(2) states:

No exceptional circumstances whatsoever, whether a state of war or a threat of war, internal political instability or any other public emergency, may be invoked as a justification of torture.

== Terrorism ==
A UK law permitting warrantless arrest and detention of suspected terrorists was found to violate protected rights according to Brogan v United Kingdom, an ECHR decision in which the court reviewed the arrest in Northern Ireland of four persons under a 1984 British law that created a special powers derogation from the established proscription against warrantless arrests.

== European Union law ==
From the outset, European Union (EU) law has allowed for limited derogation from its requirements, "to the extent and for the periods strictly necessary" to achieve the Union's objectives. Article 226 of the Treaty of Rome (1957) allowed for such derogations.

In terms of EU legislation, a derogation can also imply that a member state delays the implementation of an element of an EU Regulation (etc.) into their legal system over a given timescale, such as five years, or that a member state has opted not to enforce a specific provision in a treaty due to internal circumstances (typically a state of emergency).

== Catholic canon law ==
In canon law a dispensation affirms the validity of a law, but asserts that the law will not be held to apply to one or more specific persons, for a specific reason. (For example, while the Catholic Church's canon law does not normally recognise gender transition, an intersex woman may present appropriate medical documentation to seek, and possibly receive, a dispensation from the Holy See to live and be recognised as a man, or vice versa.) Derogation, on the other hand, affects the applicability of a law in general.

A non-canon-law analogue of dispensation might be the issuing of a zoning variance to a particular business, while a general rezoning applied to all properties in an area is more analogous to derogation.

== See also ==
- Implied repeal
- Obrogation
- Repeal
- State of emergency
