= Moderator of the curia =

Catholic administrative position

Moderator of the curia is a top administrative position held by a Catholic priest in a diocese under the supervision of the bishop. The moderator coordinates the exercise of the administrative duties and oversees the office holders, or curia, in the diocese. Moderator of the curia has been compared to that of a chief operating officer (COO) in a corporation. Although the office was first included in the 1983 Code of Canon Law, the concept is much older.

A bishop does not have to appoint a moderator; he can supervise the diocese administration himself or delegate the responsibility to other priests. The vicar general of the diocese frequently serves also as moderator. According to the Vatican, the moderator of the curia must follow the general principle:

"...that diocesan structures should always be at the service of the good of souls and that administrative demands should not take precedence over the care of persons. Therefore, he should see that the operation is smooth and efficient, avoiding all unnecessary complexity or bureaucracy, and always directed towards its proper supernatural end."

== See also ==
- Canonical admonitions
- Diocesan chancery
- Catholic Church hierarchy § Positions within a diocese at diocesan level
