= Perfect society =

Perfect society may refer to:

- Communitas perfecta, the name given to one of several political philosophies of the Catholic Church
- Utopia, a name for an ideal community or society, taken from the title of a book written in 1516 by Sir Thomas More.
