= Solemni hac liturgia =

1968 motu proprio issued by Pope Paul VI

Solemni hac liturgia ("This solemn liturgy") is a motu proprio issued by Pope Paul VI on 30 June 1968. Its content substantially consists of a creed known as the Creed of the People of God.

== Background ==
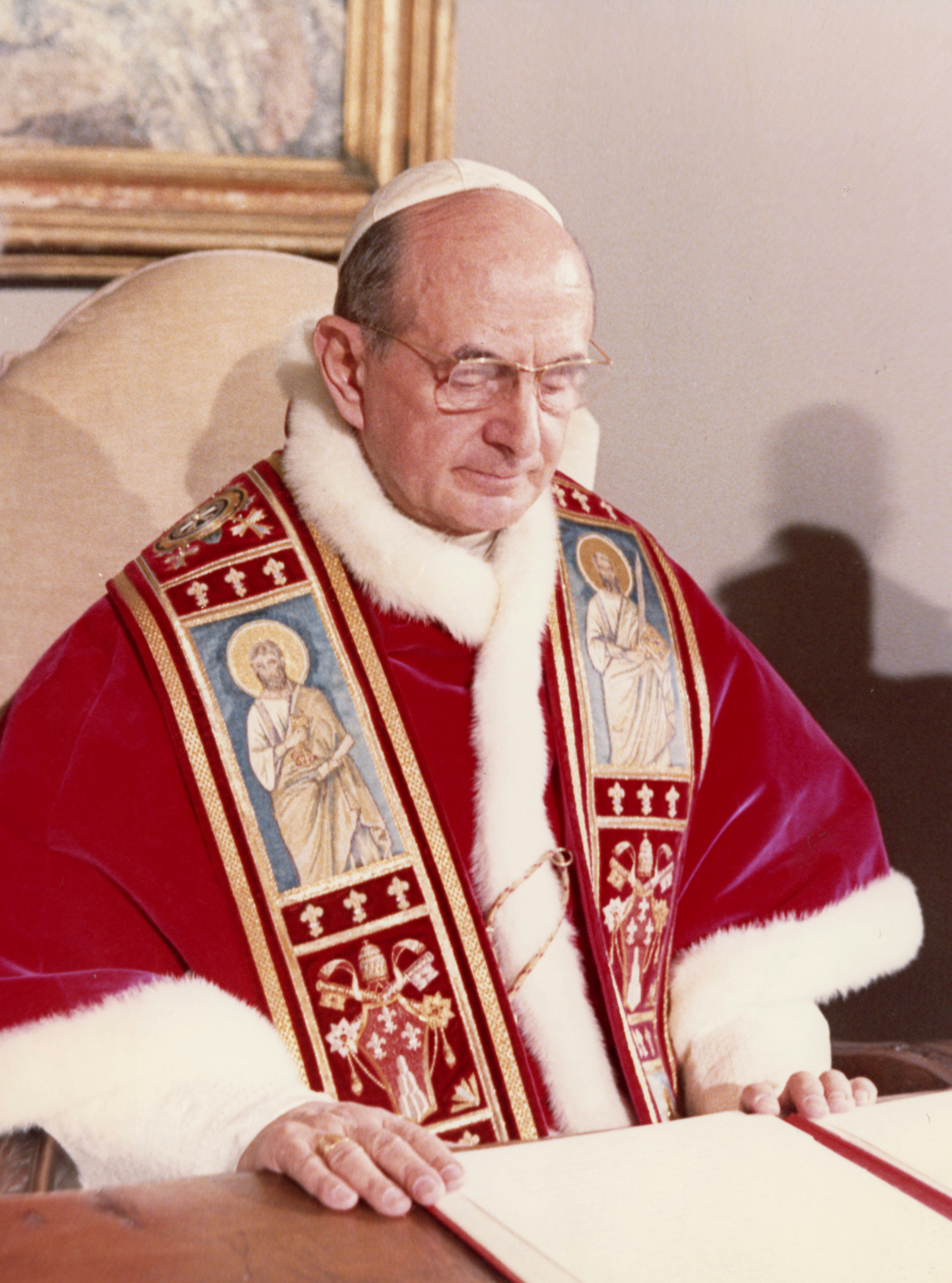
Pope Paul VI in his papal studio on 29 June 1968

During the 1960s, the Catholic Church faced significant pressure and confusion due to significant social change during the period. One such example was a catechism published in 1966 with the approval of the Dutch bishops, in which various teachings were either rejected or revised.

Thomist philosopher Jacques Maritain wrote to Cardinal Charles Journet, encouraging Pope Paul VI to issue a creed that would explicitly state the teachings of the church and expound on the Nicene Creed. Maritain subsequently drafted a creed on 11 January 1968 and sent it to Journet on 20 January 1968. It was forwarded to Pope Paul VI, who expressed his acknowledgement and further amended it before publishing in Solemni hac liturgia.

== Nature and circumstances of the profession of faith ==
Pope Paul VI spoke of it as "a profession of faith, ... a creed which, without being strictly speaking a dogmatic definition, repeats in substance, with some developments called for by the spiritual condition of our time, the creed of Nicea, the creed of the immortal tradition of the holy Church of God".

He published the profession of faith because of "the disquiet which agitates certain modern quarters with regard to the faith. They do not escape the influence of a world being profoundly changed, in which so many certainties are being disputed or discussed. We see even Catholics allowing themselves to be seized by a kind of passion for change and novelty. The Church, most assuredly, has always the duty to carry on the effort to study more deeply and to present, in a manner ever better adapted to successive generations, the unfathomable mysteries of God, rich for all in fruits of salvation. But at the same time the greatest care must be taken, while fulfilling the indispensable duty of research, to do no injury to the teachings of Christian doctrine. For that would be to give rise, as is unfortunately seen in these days, to disturbance and perplexity in many faithful souls."

In view of this disquiet, Pope Paul wished his profession of faith "to be to a high degree complete and explicit, in order that it may respond in a fitting way to the need of light felt by so many faithful souls, and by all those in the world, to whatever spiritual family they belong, who are in search of the Truth."

== Creed of the People of God ==
The Creed of the People of God is based upon the Nicene Creed. Themes include the divinity of Christ, Catholic Mariology, Catholic ecclesiology, original sin, the Bible, the sacrifice of the Mass, and the doctrine of transubstantiation.

In particular, four Marian teachings are emphasised: the virgin birth of Christ, the Theotokos, the Immaculate Conception, and the Assumption of Mary.

The Creed of the People of God is arranged in the following sections:

- God: the Father; the Son; the Holy Spirit
- Original Offense; Reborn of the Holy Spirit; Baptism
- The Church; the Word; One Shepherd
- Sacrifice of Calvary; Transubstantiation
- Temporal concern; Prospect of Resurrection

== Legacy ==
In 1992, Pope John Paul II published the Catechism of the Catholic Church, and in 2005 then-Cardinal Ratzinger (later Pope Benedict XVI) would also publish the Compendium to the Catechism of the Catholic Church.

== See also ==
- People of God
