= Philosophy, theology, and fundamental theory of Catholic canon law =

The philosophy, theology, and fundamental theory of Catholic canon law are the fields of philosophical, theological (ecclesiological), and legal scholarship which concern the place of canon law in the nature of the Catholic Church, both as a natural and as a supernatural entity. Philosophy and theology shape the concepts and self-understanding of canon law as the law of both a human organization and as a supernatural entity, since the Catholic Church believes that Jesus Christ instituted the church by direct divine command, while the fundamental theory of canon law is a meta-discipline of the "triple relationship between theology, philosophy, and canon law".

== Philosophy of canon law ==
A triple species of human [positive] law is distinguished: ecclesiastical or canon law, civil law, and the law of nations. Canon law (jus canonicum) and civil law differ among themselves partly by nature of origin, partly by nature of object, and partly by nature of end:

- They differ in origin: for the origin of the civil power is from God the author of nature; while the origin of the ecclesiastical power is from God the contributor of supernatural grace.
- They differ in object: because canon law regulates spiritual and sacred matters, while civil law regulates matters temporal and political.
- They differ in end: for canon law especially aims at the eternal happiness (beatitudo) of people; civil law, however, aims at their temporal happiness (felicitas).

=== Aristotelian-Thomistic jurisprudence ===
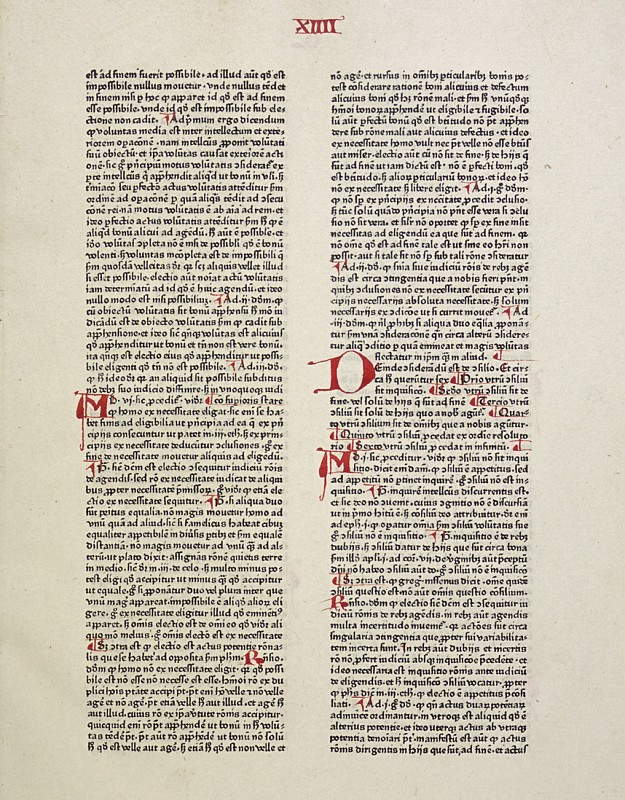
Summa theologica, Pars secunda, prima pars. (copy by Peter Schöffer, 1471)

Although canonical jurisprudential theory generally follows the principles of Aristotelian-Thomistic legal philosophy, Thomas Aquinas never explicitly discusses the place of canon law in his Treatise on Law (a small section of his Summa Theologiæ). However, Aquinas himself was influenced by canon law; the fourth clause of his famous 4-part definition of law—the requirement of promulgation—is taken from the canonists, and the sed contra of his article on promulgation cites Gratian (the "Father of Canon Law") as an authority. According to René A. Wormser,

Gratian's service in assembling and co-ordinating [sic.] the mass of canon law was of inestimable value; but the man to whom the Church and canon law are most indebted is St. Thomas Aquinas...And it is largely upon the thesis of St. Thomas Aquinas that the Church jurists went so far as to pronounce that laws were of absolutely no force whatever if they were not for the common good.

While the term "law" (lex) is never explicitly defined in the 1983 Code, the Catechism of the Catholic Church cites Aquinas in defining law as "...an ordinance of reason for the common good, promulgated by the one who is in charge of the community" and reformulates it as "...a rule of conduct enacted by competent authority for the sake of the common good." Some authors, however, dispute the applicability of the Thomistic definition of law (lex) to canon law, arguing that its application would impoverish ecclesiology and corrupt the very supernatural end of canon law.

=== Jus Publicum Ecclesiasticum ===
With the birth of the omni-competent sovereign nation-state in the seventeenth century, which claimed exclusive jurisdiction over all its citizens, the dual or concurrent jurisdiction of the Catholic Church and the sovereign state was intellectually and legally challenged. In the new legal and politico-religious climate in the period following the Protestant Reformation, the newly formed sovereign states of Europe claimed more jurisdiction over areas of law and legal practice which had traditionally been under the jurisdiction of the church. In this post-Reformation period of political change, canonical jurists sought to defend within the categories of the public law the right of the Catholic Church to make and enforce the law. Hence the name, jus publicum ecclesiasticum—"public ecclesiastical law".

The Church is not merely a corporation (collegium) or part .of civil society. Hence, the maxim is false, "Ecclesia est in statu," or, the Church is placed under the power of the state. The Church is rightly named a Sovereign State. This is proved by Soglia 13 in these words : "Ex defmitione Pufiendorfii, Status est conjunctio plurium hominum, quae imperio per homines administrate, sibi proprio, et aliunde non dependente, continetur. Atqui ex institutione Christi, Ecclesia est conjunctio hominum, quae per homines, hoc est, per Petrum et Apostolos, eorumque successores administratur cum imperio sibi proprio, nee aliunde dependente; ergo Ecclesia est Status."

The justification of the legal powers of the Catholic Church would now be defended along the lines of the sovereign state's justification for its own legal powers, and the Catholic Church would be considered a concurrent and complementary Communitas Perfecta in the realm of the supernatural end of man to that of the civil sovereign state in the realm of the natural end of man.

=== Communitas Perfecta ===
Many canonists, in the years preceding the Second Vatican Council, considered the justification and basis for canon law being a true legal system to be that the Catholic Church was established by Jesus Christ as a Communitas Perfecta, and as such was a true human society which had the right to make human law.

the Church is a Sovereign State, that is, a perfect and supreme society, established by our Lord for the purpose of leading men to heaven. We say, a society; now what is a society? Speaking in general, it is a number of persons associated together, in order to attain, by united efforts, some common end. We say, perfect; because she is complete of herself, and therefore has within her own bosom all the means sufficient to enable her to attain her end. We say, supreme, because she is subject to no other society on earth. Like every society, the Church is an external organization. For she is composed of human beings, who have a body as well as a soul. She is, in fact, by the will of her divine Founder, a community, an association of men, governed by men. Like every external organization, the Church must be governed by laws and regulations that will enable her to fulfill her mission and attain her end. The aim and end of the Church is the worship of God and the salvation of souls. Any action or omission, therefore, on the part of her members, which hinders her from carrying out her mission or reaching her end, and, consequently, whatever contravenes the regulations made by her concerning the worship of God and the sanctification of her children, is punishable by her. For God, having given her a mission, also gave her the means or the power to fulfill it. Hence she can establish, in fact has established, laws, and regulations, obligatory on her members. If the members violate those laws, they not only sin against God, but they offend also against the order, discipline, laws, or regulations established by the Church.

Fernando della Rocca asserted that it is a "fundamental principle of canon law which insists on the right of the Church as a perfect society, (Note: In the context of ecclesiological discourse, "perfect society (societas perfecta)" and "perfect community (communitas perfecta)" have the same meaning and are used interchangeably.) to determine, particularly in the field of legislation, the limits of its own power." Even Pope Benedict XV, in his apostolic constitution promulgating the 1917 Code of Canon Law, attributed the legislative authority of the church to it being founded by Jesus Christ with all the requirements for a Communitas Perfecta.

== Theology of canon law ==
In the decades following the Second Vatican Council, many canonists called for a more theological, rather than philosophical, conception of canon law, acknowledging the "triple relationship between theology, philosophy, and canon law".

Pope Benedict XVI, in his address of 21 January 2012 before the Roman Rota, taught that canonical laws can only be interpreted and fully understood within the Catholic Church in the light of her mission and ecclesiological structure.

Were one to tend to identify Canon Law with the system of the laws of the canons, the understanding of that which is juridical in the Church would essentially consist in the comprehending of that which the legal texts establish. At first glance, this approach would appear to hold Human Law entirely in value. However the impoverishment which this conception would bring about becomes manifest: with the practical oblivion of the Natural Law and of the Divine Positive Law, as well as the vital relationship of every Law with the communion and the mission of the Church, the work of the interpreter becomes deprived of vital contact with ecclesial reality.

Some authors conceive of canon law as essentially theological and the discipline of canon law as a theological subdiscipline, but Msgr. Carlos José Errázuriz contends that "in a certain sense, all postconciliar canonical scholarship has shown a theological concern in the widest sense, that is, a tendency to determine more clearly the place of the juridical in the mystery of the Church."

=== Ecclesiological inspiration of the 1983 Code ===
In view of the decision to reform the existing 1983 Code, the Second Vatican Council, in the decree Optatam totius (§16), ordered that "the teaching of canon law [...] should take into account the mystery of the Church, according to the dogmatic constitution De Ecclesia".

The 1917 Code was structured according to the Roman law division of "norms, persons, things, procedures, penalties", while the 1983 Code, in total contrast, was deliberately given a much more doctrinal-theological structure. John Paul II described the ecclesiological inspiration of the new code of canon law in this way:

The instrument, which the Code is, fully corresponds to the nature of the Church, especially as it is proposed by the teaching of the Second Vatican Council in general, and in a particular way by its ecclesiological teaching. Indeed, in a certain sense, this new Code could be understood as a great effort to translate this same doctrine, that is, the conciliar ecclesiology, into canonical language. If, however, it is impossible to translate perfectly into canonical language the conciliar image of the Church, nevertheless, in this image there should always be found as far as possible its essential point of reference.

Thus the 1983 Code is configured, as far as possible, according to the "mystery of the Church", the most significant divisions—Books II, III, and IV—corresponding to the munus regendi, the munus sanctificandi, and the munus docendi (the "missions" of governance, of worship/sanctification, and of teaching) which in turn derive from the kingly, the priestly and the prophetic roles or functions of Christ.

== Fundamental theory of canon law ==
The fundamental theory of canon law is a discipline covering the basis of canon law in the very nature of the church. Fundamental theory is a newer discipline that takes as its object "the existence and nature of what is juridical in the Church of Jesus Christ." The discipline seeks to provide a theoretical basis for the coexistence and complementarity of canon law and the Catholic Church, and it seeks to refute the "canonical antijuridicism" (the belief that law of the church constitutes a contradiction in terms; that law and church are radically incompatible) of the various heretical movements and of the Protestant Reformation on the one hand, and on the other, the antijuridicism deriving from a belief that all law is identifiable with the law of the state; that in order to be true law, the state must be its maker. The discipline seeks to better explain the nature of law in the church and engages in theological discussions in post-conciliar Catholicism and seeks to combat "postconciliar antijuridicism".
