= Ecclesiology =

Theological study of the Christian Church

In Christian theology, ecclesiology is the study of the Church, the origins of Christianity, its relationship to Jesus, its role in salvation, its polity, its discipline, its eschatology, and its leadership.

In its early history, one of the Church's primary ecclesiological issues had to do with the status of Gentile members in what had become the New Testament fulfilment of the essentially Jewish Old Testament church. It later contended with such questions as whether it was to be governed by a council of presbyters or a single bishop, how much authority the bishop of Rome had over other major bishops, the role of the church in the world, whether salvation was possible outside of the institution of the Church, the relationship between the church and the state, and questions of theology and liturgy and other issues. Ecclesiology may be used in the specific sense of a particular church or denomination's character, self-described or otherwise. This is the sense of the word in such phrases as Catholic ecclesiology, Protestant ecclesiology, and ecumenical ecclesiology.

== Etymology ==
The roots of the word ecclesiology come from the Greek ἐκκλησία, ekklēsia (Latin: ecclesia) meaning "congregation, church" (Note: In the Greco-Roman world, ecclesia was used to refer to a lawful assembly, or a called legislative body. As early as Pythagoras, the word took on the additional meaning of a community with shared beliefs. This is the meaning taken in the Greek translation of the Hebrew Scriptures (the Septuagint), and later adopted by the Christian community to refer to the assembly of believers.) and -λογία, -logia, meaning "words", "knowledge", or "logic", a combining term used in the names of sciences or bodies of knowledge.

The similar word ecclesialogy first appeared in the quarterly journal The British Critic in 1837, in an article written by an anonymous contributor who defined it thus:

We mean, then, by Ecclesialogy, a science which may treat of the proper construction and operations of the Church, or Communion, or Society of Christians; and which may regard men as they are members of that society, whether members of the Christian Church in the widest acceptation of the term, or members of some branch or communion of that Church, located in some separate kingdom, and governed according to its internal forms of constitution and discipline.

However, in volume 4 of the Cambridge Camden Society's journal The Ecclesiologist, published in January 1845, that society (the CCS) claimed that they had invented the word ecclesiology:

...as a general organ of Ecclesiology; that peculiar branch of science to which it seems scarcely too much to say, that this very magazine gave first its being and its name.

The Ecclesiologist was first published in October 1841 and dealt with the study of the building and decoration of churches. It particularly encouraged the restoration of Anglican churches back to their supposed Gothic splendour and it was at the centre of the wave of Victorian restoration that spread across England and Wales in the second half of the 19th century. Its successor Ecclesiology Today is still, as of 2017, being published by The Ecclesiological Society (successor to the CCS, now a registered charity).

The situation regarding the etymology has been summed up by Alister McGrath: "'Ecclesiology' is a term that has changed its meaning in recent theology. Formerly the science of the building and decoration of churches, promoted by the Cambridge Camden Society, the Ecclesiological Society and the journal The Ecclesiologist, ecclesiology now stands for the study of the nature of the Christian church."

== Catholic ecclesiology ==
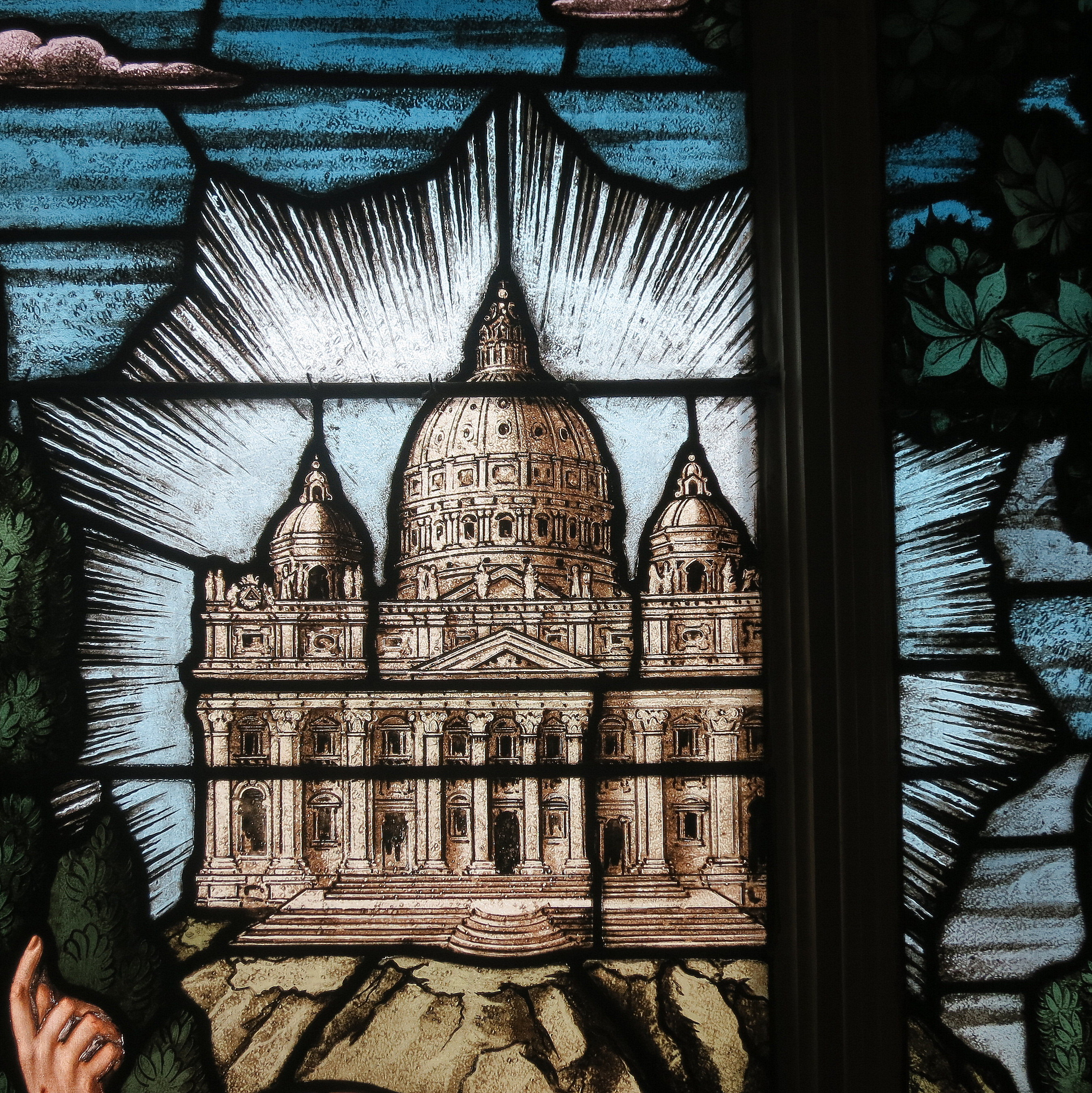
Stained-glass window in a Catholic church depicting St. Peter's Basilica in Rome sitting "Upon this rock," a reference to Matthew 16:18. Most present-day Catholics interpret Jesus as saying he was building his church on the rock of the Apostle Peter and the line of popes who claim Petrine succession from him.

Catholic ecclesiology today has a plurality of models and views, as with all Catholic Theology since the acceptance of scholarly Biblical criticism that began in the early to mid-20th century. This shift is most clearly marked by the encyclical Divino afflante Spiritu in 1943. Avery Robert Cardinal Dulles, S.J. contributed greatly to the use of models in understanding ecclesiology. In his work Models of the Church, he defines five basic models of the Church that have been prevalent throughout the history of the Catholic Church. These include models of the Church as institution, as mystical communion, as sacrament, as herald, and as servant.

The ecclesiological model of Church as an institution holds that the Catholic Church alone is the "one, holy, catholic and apostolic Church", and is the only Church of divine and apostolic origin led by the Pope. This view of the Church is dogmatically defined Catholic doctrine, and is therefore de fide. In this view, the Catholic Church— composed of all baptized, professing Catholics, both clergy and laity—is the unified, visible society founded by Christ himself, and its hierarchy derives its spiritual authority through the centuries, via apostolic succession of its bishops, most especially through the bishop of Rome (the Pope) whose successorship comes from St. Peter the Apostle, to whom Christ gave "the keys to the Kingdom of Heaven". Thus, the Popes, in the Catholic view, have a God-ordained universal jurisdiction over the whole Church on earth. The Catholic Church is considered Christ's mystical body, and the universal sacrament of salvation, whereby Christ enables human to receive sanctifying grace.

The model of Church as Mystical Communion draws on two major Biblical images, the first of the "Mystical Body of Christ" (as developed in Paul's Epistles) and the second of the "People of God." This image goes beyond the Aristotelian-Scholastic model of "Communitas Perfecta" held in previous centuries. This ecclesiological model draws upon sociology and articulations of two types of social relationships: a formally organized or structured society (Gesellschaft) and an informal or interpersonal community (Gemeinschaft). The Catholic theologian Arnold Rademacher maintained that the Church in its inner core is community (Gemeinschaft) and in its outer core society (Gesellschaft). Here, the interpersonal aspect of the Church is given primacy and that the structured Church is the result of a real community of believers. Similarly, Yves Congar argued that the ultimate reality of the Church is a fellowship of persons. This ecclesiology opens itself to ecumenism and was the prevailing model used by the Second Vatican Council in its ecumenical efforts. The Council, using this model, recognized in its document Lumen gentium that the Body of Christ subsists in a visible society governed by the Successor of Peter and by the Bishops in communion with him, although many elements of sanctification and of truth are found outside its visible structure.

== Eastern Orthodox ecclesiology ==
From the Eastern Orthodox perspective, the Church is one, even though it is manifested in many places. Eastern Orthodox ecclesiology operates with a plurality in unity and a unity in plurality. For Eastern Orthodoxy there is no 'either / or' between the one and the many. No attempt is made to subordinate the many to the one (the Roman Catholic model), nor the one to the many (the Protestant model). In this view, it is both canonically and theologically correct to speak of the Church and the churches, and vice versa. Historically, that ecclesiological concept was applied in practice as patriarchal pentarchy, embodied in ecclesiastical unity of five major patriarchal thrones (Rome, Constantinople, Alexandria, Antioch and Jerusalem).

There is disagreement between the Ecumenical Patriarchate of Constantinople and the Patriarchate of Moscow on the question of separation between ecclesiological and theological primacy and separation of the different ecclesiological levels:

- Position of the Moscow Patriarchate on the problem of primacy in the Universal Church
- First without Equals. A Response to the Text on Primacy of the Moscow Patriarchate, by Elpidophoros Lambriniadis, Metropolitan of Bursa

== Ecclesiology of the Church of the East ==
Historical development of the Church of the East outside the political borders of the Late Roman Empire and its eastern successor, the Byzantine Empire, resulted in the creation of its distinctive theological and ecclesiological traditions, regarding not only the questions of internal institutional and administrative organization of the Church, but also the questions of universal ecclesiastical order.

== Lutheran ecclesiology ==
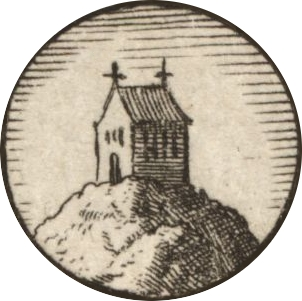
A 17th-century illustration of Article VII: Of the Church from the Augsburg Confession, which states "...one holy Church is to continue forever. The Church is the congregation of saints, in which the Gospel is rightly taught and the Sacraments are rightly administered." Here the rock from Matthew 16:18 refers to the preaching and ministry of Jesus as the Christ, a view discussed at length in the 1537 Treatise.

The Lutheran churches hold that "where the gospel is proclaimed and the sacraments administered in accord with that gospel, there the church truly is." The Holy Spirit works through the proclamation of the Word and the administration of the sacraments "to call, gather, enlighten, and sanctify the whole Christian church on earth".

The Lutheran Church views itself as the "main trunk of the historical Christian Tree" founded by Christ and the Apostles, holding that during the Reformation, the Church of Rome fell away. The Augsburg Confession found within the Book of Concord, a compendium of belief of the Lutheran churches, teaches that "the faith as confessed by Luther and his followers is nothing new, but the true Catholic faith, and that their churches represent the true catholic or universal church". When the Lutherans presented the Augsburg Confession to Charles V, Holy Roman Emperor in 1530, they believe to have "showed that each article of faith and practice was true first of all to Holy Scripture, and then also to the teaching of the church fathers and the councils". Martin Luther argued that because the Catholic Church had "lost sight of the doctrine of grace", it had "lost its claim to be considered as the authentic Christian church". This argument was open to the counter-criticism from Catholics that he was thus guilty of schism and the heresy of Donatism, and in both cases therefore opposing central teachings of the early Church and most especially the Church Father St. Augustine of Hippo.

== Calvin’s ecclesiology ==
Calvin understood the church as the body of Christ, emphasizing that Christ is the head and the center of the church. He also described the church as the “mother of believers,” through whom faith matures and grows. The church plays a role in leading believers to the birth, growth, and goal of salvation. The foundation of Calvin’s ecclesiology is that the church is the covenant community chosen by God. The church is a community selected by God to reveal His glory, and Calvin stressed the communal nature of the church over the individual. Through the church, God’s covenant is implemented and believers are bonded together. Calvin emphasized two marks of a true church: the right preaching of the Word and the proper administration of the sacraments. These are seen as the most important functions of the church. He explained that the church is governed by Christ through office bearers (pastors, elders, deacons, etc.).

== Anabaptist ecclesiology ==
There is no single "Radical Reformation Ecclesiology". A variety of views is expressed among the various "Radical Reformation" participants.

A key "Radical Reformer" was Menno Simons, known as an "Anabaptist". He wrote:

They verily are not the true congregation of Christ who merely boast of his name. But they are the true congregation of Christ who are truly converted, who are born from above of God, who are of a regenerate mind by the operation of the Holy Spirit through the hearing of the divine Word, and have become the children of God, have entered into obedience to him, and live unblamably in his holy commandments, and according to his holy will with all their days, or from the moment of their call.

This was in direct contrast to the hierarchical, sacramental ecclesiology that characterised the incumbent Roman Catholic tradition as well as the new Lutheran and other prominent Protestant movements of the Reformation.

Some other Radical Reformation ecclesiology holds that "the true church [is] in heaven, and no institution of any kind on earth merit[s] the name 'church of God.'"

== See also ==
- Great Church
- East–West Schism § Ecclesiological disputes (Eastern Orthodox theology)
- Branch theory (Anglican theology)

For historical Protestant ecclesiology, see

- Augsburg Confession, Article XXVIII: Of Ecclesiastical Power
- 1689 Baptist Confession of Faith, Chapter 26: Of the Church
- Theology of John Calvin § Ecclesiology and sacraments

== Sources ==
- Erickson, John H. (1992). "The Local Churches and Catholicity: An Orthodox Perspective". The Jurist. 52: 490–508.
- Jugie, Martin (1935). "L'ecclésiologie des Nestoriens". Échos d'Orient. 34 (177): 5–25. doi:10.3406/rebyz.1935.2817.
- Pheidas, Blasios I. (2005). "Papal Primacy and Patriarchal Pentarchy in the Orthodox Tradition". The Petrine Ministry: Catholics and Orthodox in Dialogue. New York: The Newman Press. ISBN 9780809143344.
