= Fundamental theory =

Fundamental theory or Fundamental Theory may refer to:

- Philosophy, theology, and fundamental theory of Catholic canon law, the discipline of the philosophical and theological basis of Catholic canon law
- Fundamental theory (Eddington), Arthur Eddington's "Theory of Everything"
- Fundamental Theory, a 1948 posthumous book by Arthur Eddington

== See also ==
- Theory of everything, a hypothetical single, all-encompassing, coherent theoretical framework of physics
