= Canon law of the Catholic Church =

Catholic religious laws and principles

Canon law (from Latin ius canonicum) is the system of religious laws and ecclesiastical legal principles made and enforced by the hierarchical authorities of the Catholic Church to regulate its external organization and government and to order and direct the activities of Catholics toward the mission of the Church.

It is the first modern Western legal system and is the oldest continuously functioning legal system in the West, while the unique traditions of Eastern Catholic canon law govern the 23 Eastern Catholic particular churches sui iuris.

Positive ecclesiastical laws, based directly or indirectly upon immutable divine law or natural law, derive formal authority in the case of universal laws from promulgation by the supreme legislator—the supreme pontiff, who possesses the totality of legislative, executive, and judicial power in his person, or by the College of Bishops acting in communion with the pope. In contrast, particular laws derive formal authority from promulgation by a legislator inferior to the supreme legislator, whether an ordinary or a delegated legislator. The actual subject material of the canons is not just doctrinal or moral in nature, but all-encompassing of the human condition.

The canon law of the Catholic Church has all the ordinary elements of a mature legal system: laws, courts, lawyers, and judges. The canon law of the Catholic Church is articulated in the legal code for the Latin Church and in the code for the Eastern Catholic Churches. This canon law has principles of legal interpretation, and coercive penalties. It lacks civilly-binding force in most secular jurisdictions.

Canon law as a sacred science is called canonistics. The jurisprudence of canon law is the complex of legal principles and traditions within which canon law operates, while the philosophy, theology, and fundamental theory of Catholic canon law are the areas of philosophical, theological, and legal scholarship dedicated to providing a theoretical basis for canon law as a legal system and as true law.

== Definitions ==
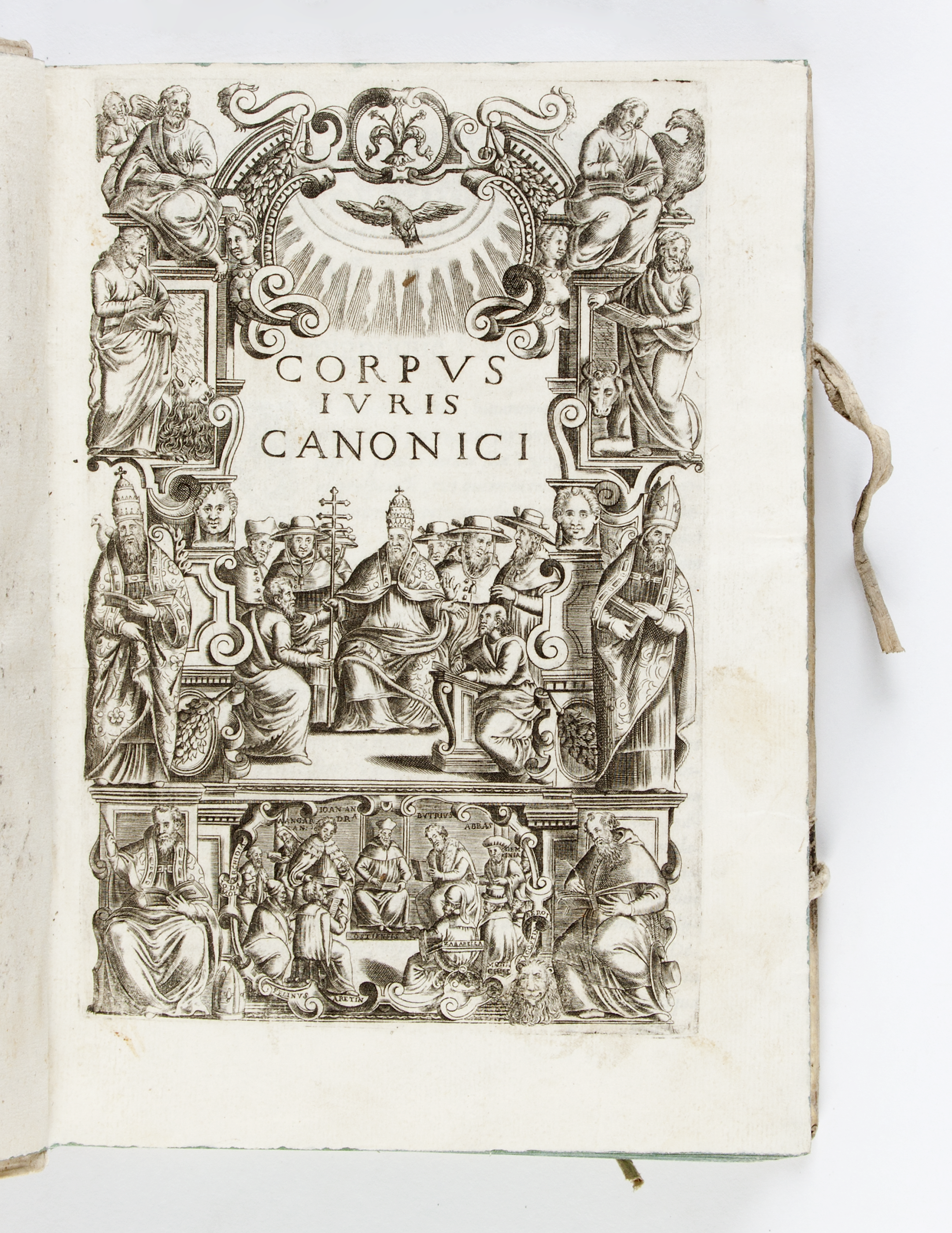
The Corpus Juris Canonici, the fundamental collection of Catholic canon law for over 750 years

The term "canon law" (ius canonicum) was only regularly used from the twelfth century onwards. The term ius ecclesiasticum, by contrast, referred to the secular law, whether imperial, royal, or feudal, that dealt with relations between the state and the Catholic Church. The term corpus iuris canonici was used to denote canon law as legal system beginning in the thirteenth century.

Other terms sometimes used synonymously with ius canonicum include ius sacrum, ius ecclesiasticum, ius divinum, and ius pontificium, as well as sacri canones (sacred canons).

Ecclesiastical positive law is the positive law that emanates from the legislative power of the Catholic Church in its effort to govern its members in accordance with the Gospel of Jesus Christ. Fernando della Rocca used the term "ecclesiastical-positive law" in contradistinction to civil-positive law, in order to differentiate between the human legislators of church and state, all of which issue "positive law" in the normal sense.

Examples of ecclesiastical positive law are fasting during the liturgical season of Lent, and religious workers (monks, nuns, etc.) requiring permission from their superiors to publish a book.

Those who are versed and skilled in canon law, and professors of canon law, are called canonists (or colloquially, canon lawyers).

=== Etymology of "canon" ===
The word "canon" comes from the Greek kanon, which in its original usage denoted a straight rod, was later used for a measuring stick, and eventually came to mean a rule or norm. In 325, when the first ecumenical council, Nicaea I, was held, kanon started to obtain the restricted juridical denotation of a law promulgated by a synod or ecumenical council, as well as that of an individual bishop.

== Sources of canon law ==
The term source or fountain of canon law (fons iuris canonici) may be taken in a twofold sense: a) as the formal cause of the existence of a law, and in this sense of the fontes essendi (Latin: "sources of being") of canon law or lawgivers; b) as the material channel through which laws are handed down and made known, and in this sense the sources are styled fontes cognoscendi (Latin: "sources of knowing"), or depositaries, like sources of history.

== Legal history and codification ==
The Catholic Church has the oldest continuously functioning legal system in the West, much later than Roman law but predating the evolution of modern European civil law traditions. What began with rules ("canons") said to have been adopted by the Apostles at the Council of Jerusalem in the first century has developed into a highly complex legal system encapsulating not just norms of the New Testament, but some elements of the Hebrew (Old Testament), Roman, Visigothic, Saxon, and Celtic legal traditions. As many as 36 collections of canon law are known to have been brought into existence before 1150.

The history of Latin canon law can be divided into four periods: the ius antiquum, the ius novum, the ius novissimum and the Codex Iuris Canonici. In relation to the Code, history can be divided into the ius vetus (all law before the 1917 Code) and the ius novum (the law of the code, or ius codicis).

The Eastern Catholic canon law of the Eastern Catholic Churches, which had developed some different disciplines and practices, underwent its own process of codification, resulting in the Code of Canons of the Eastern Churches promulgated in 1990 by Pope John Paul II.

=== Ius antiquum ===
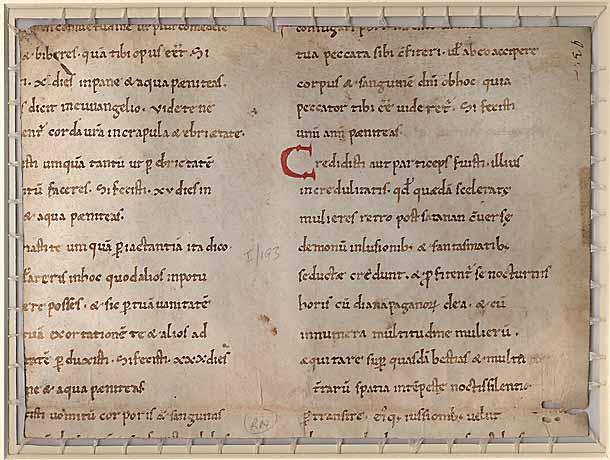
Image of pages from the Decretum of Burchard of Worms, the 11th-century book of canon law

The period of canonical history known as the ius antiquum ("ancient law") extends from the foundation of the Church to the time of Gratian (mid-12th century). This period can be further divided into three periods: the time of the apostles to the death of Pope Gelasius I (A.D. 496), the end of the 5th century to the spurious collection of the 9th century, and the last up to the time of Gratian (mid-12th century).

In the Early Church, the first canons were decreed by bishops united in "Ecumenical" councils (the Emperor summoning all of the known world's bishops to attend with at least the acknowledgement of the Bishop of Rome) or "local" councils (bishops of a region or territory). Over time, these canons were supplemented with decretals of the Bishops of Rome, which were responses to doubts or problems according to the maxim, "Roma locuta est, causa finita est" ("Rome has spoken, the case is closed"). A common misconception, the Catholic Encyclopedia links this saying to St Augustine who actually said something quite different: "jam enim de hac causa duo concilia missa sunt ad sedem apostolicam; inde etiam rescripta venerunt; causa finita est" (which roughly translate to: "there are two councils, for now, this matter as brought to the Apostolic See, whence also letters are come to pass, the case was finished") in response to the heretical Pelagianism of the time.

In the first millennium of the Latin Church, the canons of various ecumenical and local councils were supplemented with decretals of the popes; these were gathered together into collections.

=== Ius novum ===
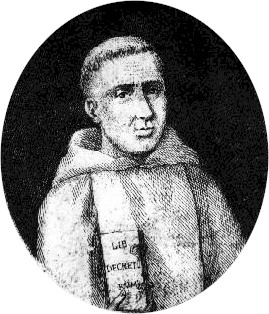
Gratian, the "Father of Canon Law"

The period of canonical history known as the Ius novum ("new law") or middle period covers the time from Gratian to the Council of Trent (mid-12th century–16th century).

The spurious conciliar canons and papal decrees were gathered together into collections, both unofficial and official. In the year 1000, there was no book that had attempted to summarize the whole body of canon law, to systematize it in whole or in part. The first truly systematic collection was assembled by the Camaldolese monk Gratian in the 11th century, commonly known as the Decretum Gratiani ("Gratian's Decree") but originally called The Concordance of Discordant Canons (Concordantia Discordantium Canonum). Before Gratian there was no "jurisprudence of canon law" (system of legal interpretation and principles). Gratian is the founder of canonical jurisprudence, which merits him the title "Father of Canon Law". Gratian also had an enormous influence on the history of natural law in his transmission of the ancient doctrines of natural law to Scholasticism.

Canon law greatly increased from 1140 to 1234. After that, it slowed down, except for the laws of local councils (an area of canon law in need of scholarship), and secular laws supplemented. In 1234 Pope Gregory IX promulgated the first official collection of canons, called the Decretalia Gregorii Noni or Liber Extra. This was followed by the Liber Sextus (1298) of Boniface VIII, the Clementines (1317) of Clement V, the Extravagantes Joannis XXII and the Extravagantes Communes, all of which followed the same structure as the Liber Extra. All these collections, with the Decretum Gratiani, are together referred to as the Corpus Iuris Canonici. After the completion of the Corpus Iuris Canonici, subsequent papal legislation was published in periodic volumes called Bullaria.

In the thirteenth century, the Roman Church began to collect and organize its canon law, which after a millennium of development had become a complex and difficult system of interpretation and cross-referencing. The official collections were the Liber Extra (1234) of Pope Gregory IX, the Liber Sextus (1298) of Boniface VIII and the Clementines (1317), prepared for Clement V but published by John XXII. These were addressed to the universities by papal letters at the beginning of each collection, and these texts became textbooks for aspiring canon lawyers. In 1582 a compilation was made of the Decretum, Extra, the Sext, the Clementines, and the Extravagantes (that is, the decretals of the popes from Pope John XXII to Pope Sixtus IV).

=== Ius novissimum ===
The third canonical period, known as the ius novissimum ("newest law"), stretches from the Council of Trent to the promulgation of the 1917 Code of Canon Law which took legal effect in 1918. The start of the ius novissimum is not universally agreed upon, however. Edward N. Peters argues that the ius novissimum actually started with the Liber Extra of Gregory IX in 1234.

=== Ius codicis ===
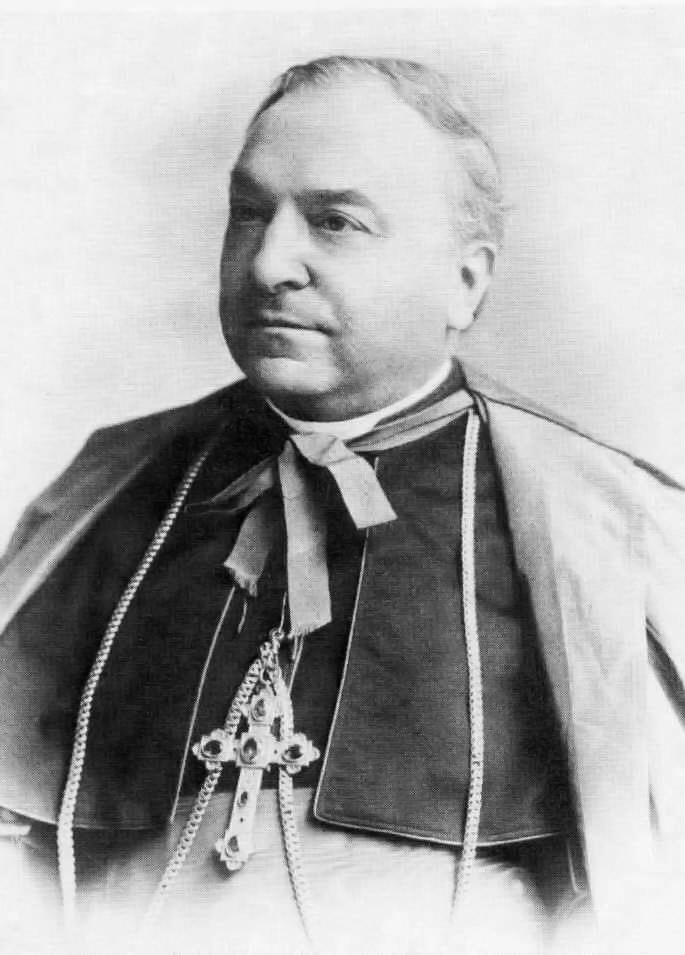
Cardinal Pietro Gasparri, architect of the 1917 Code of Canon Law

The fourth period of canonical history is that of the present day, initiated by the promulgation of the 1917 Code of Canon Law on 27 May 1917.

Benedict XV, in his bull of promulgation, refers to the motu proprio Arduum sane, which was issued by Pius X, March 17, 1904, and gave rise to the 1917 Code. In that pronouncement, the Pontiff stated the reasons which prompted him as the supreme Pastor of souls, who has the care of all the churches, to provide for a new codification of ecclesiastic laws, with a view "to put together with order and clearness all the laws of the Church thus far issued, removing all those that would be recognized as abrogated or obsolete, adapting others to the necessities of the times, and enacting new ones in conformity with the present needs."

It is sometimes referred to as the ius codicis ("law of the code") or, in comparison with all law before it, the ius novum ("new law"). From time to time, the Pontifical Council for Legislative Texts issues authentic interpretations regarding the code. The pope occasionally amends the text of the codes.

==== Pio-Benedictine law ====
By the 19th century, the body of canonical legislation included some 10,000 norms. Many of these were difficult to reconcile with one another due to changes in circumstances and practice. The situation impelled Pope Pius X to order the creation of the first Code of Canon Law, a single volume of clearly stated laws. Under the aegis of the Cardinal Pietro Gasparri, the Commission for the Codification of Canon Law was completed under Benedict XV, who promulgated the Code on 27 May 1917, effective on 29 May 1918. The work having been begun by Pius X, it was sometimes called the "Pio-Benedictine Code" but more often the 1917 Code to distinguish it from the later 1983 Code which replaced it. In its preparation, centuries of material was examined, scrutinized for authenticity by leading experts, and harmonized as much as possible with opposing canons and even other codes, from the Code of Justinian to the Napoleonic Code.

==== Johanno-Pauline law ====
In the succeeding decades, some parts of the 1917 Code were retouched, especially under Pope Pius XII. In 1959, Pope John XXIII announced, together with his intention to call the Second Vatican Council, that the 1917 Code would be completely revised. In 1963, the commission appointed to undertake the task decided to delay the project until the council had been concluded. After Vatican II closed in 1965, it became apparent that the 1917 Code would need to be revised in light of the documents and theology of Vatican II. When work finally began, almost two decades of study and discussion on drafts of the various sections were needed before Pope John Paul II could promulgate the revised edition, which came into force on 27 November 1983, having been promulgated via the apostolic constitution Sacrae Disciplinae Leges of 25 January 1983. Containing 1752 canons, it is the law currently binding on the Latin Church.

This codification is referred to as the 1983 Code of Canon Law to distinguish it from the 1917 Code. Like the preceding codification, it applies to Roman Catholics of the Latin Church.

As the currently-in-force law for the Latin Church, it constitutes a major part of the Ius vigens (Latin: "active law").

=== Eastern Catholic canon law ===
Eastern Catholic canon law is the law of the 23 Catholic sui iuris particular churches of the Eastern Catholic tradition. Oriental canon law includes both the common tradition among all Eastern Catholic Churches, now chiefly contained in the Code of Canons of the Eastern Churches, as well as the particular law proper to each individual sui iuris particular Eastern Catholic Church. Originating with the canons of particular councils and the writings of the Eastern Church Fathers, oriental canon law developed in concert with Byzantine Roman laws, leading to the compilation of nomocanons. Oriental canon law is distinguished from Latin canon law, which developed along a separate line in the remnants of the Western Roman Empire under the direct influence of the Roman Pontiff, and is now chiefly codified in the 1983 Code of Canon Law.

==== Nomocanons ====
A nomocanon (nomokanon) is a collection of ecclesiastical law, consisting of the elements from both the civil law (nomoi) and the canon law (kanones). Collections of this kind were found only in Eastern law. The Greek Church has two principal nomocanonical collections, the "Nomocanon of John Scholasticus" of the sixth century and the "Nomocanon in 14 titles", which dates from the reign of the Byzantine Emperor Heraclius (r. 610–641), made by fusion of the Collectio tripartita (collection of Justinian's imperial law) and "Canonic syntagma" (ecclesiastical canons). The latter was long held in esteem and passed into the Russian Church, but it was by degrees supplanted by the "Nomocanon of Photios" in 883. Photius compiled systematically the canons of the East which amount to a counterpart of Gratian in the West. His 2-part collection, a chronological collection of synodal canons and his nomocanon revision with updated civil laws, became a classical source of ancient canon law for the Greek Church.

==== Code of Canons of the Eastern Churches ====
For Eastern Catholics, two sections of Eastern Catholic canon law had already, under Pope Pius XII, been put in the form of short canons. These parts were revised as part of the application of Pope John XXIII's decision to carry out a general revision of the Church's canon law; as a result, a distinct Code for members of the Eastern Catholic Churches came into effect for the first time on 1 October 1991 (Apostolic Constitution Sacri Canones of 18 October 1990). The Code of Canons of the Eastern Churches, as it is called, differs from the Latin 1983 Code of Canon Law in matters where Eastern and Latin traditions diverge, such as terminology, discipline concerning hierarchical offices, and administration of the sacraments.

=== Synodality reform ===
In September 2026, a commission was established to implement in Latin Church canon law the final magisterial document of the Synod on Synodality held two years earlier. The assignment includes specific interventions on canon law in force in the short term, and the issuance of new institutions and the revision of those in force in collaboration with the competent dicasteries of the Roman Curia in the medium term.

In the longer term, revisions to both the Latin and Eastern canon law codes are expected to arise from this work.

== Jurisprudence of canon law ==
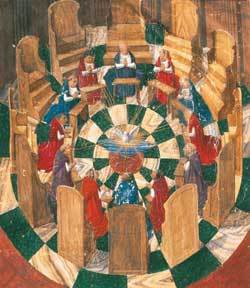
Portrayal of a meeting of the Roman Rota

The institutions and practices of canon law paralleled the legal development of much of Europe, and consequently both modern civil law and common law bear the influences of canon law.

From the days of Ethelbert onwards [say, from the year 600], English law was under the influence of so much of Roman law as had worked itself into the traditions of the Catholic Church.

Much of the legislative style was adapted from that of Roman Law especially the Justinianic Corpus Iuris Civilis. After the 'fall' of the Roman Empire and up until the revival of Roman Law in the 11th century canon law served as the most important unifying force among the local systems in the Civil Law tradition. The Catholic Church developed the inquisitorial system in the Middle Ages. The canonists introduced into post-Roman Europe the concept of a higher law of ultimate justice, over and above the momentary law of the state.

In one of his elaborate orations in the United States Senate Mr. Charles Sumner spoke of "the generous presumption of the common law in favor of the innocence of an accused person"; yet it must be admitted that such a presumption cannot be found in Anglo-Saxon law, where sometimes the presumption seems to have been the other way. And in a very recent case in the Supreme Court of the United States, the case of Coffin, 156 U. S. 432, it is pointed out that this presumption was fully established in the Roman law, and was preserved in the canon law.

The primary canonical sources of law are the 1983 Code of Canon Law, the Code of Canons of the Eastern Churches, and Pastor Bonus. Other sources include apostolic constitutions, motibus propriis, particular law, and—with the approbation of the competent legislator—custom. A law must be promulgated for it to have legal effect. A later and contrary law obrogates an earlier law.

Canonists have formulated interpretive rules of law for the magisterial (non-legislatorial) interpretation of canon laws. An authentic interpretation is an official interpretation of a law issued by the law's legislator, and has the force of law.

== Philosophy, theology, and fundamental theory ==
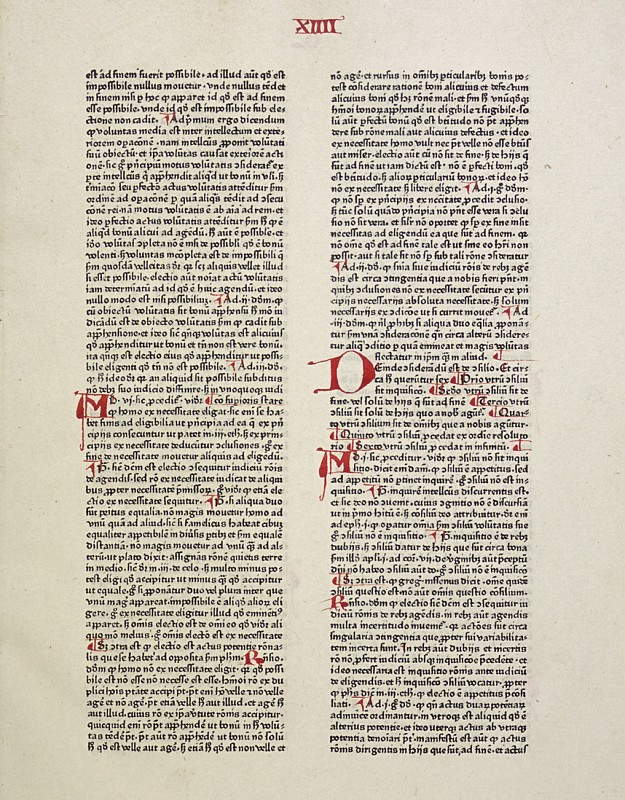
Summa theologica, Pars secunda, prima pars (copy by Peter Schöffer, 1471)

Although canonical jurisprudential theory of Catholic canon law generally follows the principles of Aristotelian-Thomistic legal philosophy, Thomas Aquinas never explicitly discusses the place of canon law in his Treatise on Law. However, Aquinas himself was influenced by canon law. While many canonists apply the Thomistic definition of law (lex) to Catholic canon law without objection, some authors dispute the applicability of the Thomistic definition to canon law, arguing that its application would impoverish ecclesiology and corrupt the very supernatural end of canon law.

In the decades following the Second Vatican Council, many canonists called for a more theological, rather than philosophical, conception of Catholic canon law, acknowledging the "triple relationship between theology, philosophy, and canon law". Some authors conceive of canon law as essentially theological and the discipline of canon law as a theological subdiscipline, but Msgr. Carlos José Errázuriz contends that "in a certain sense, all postconciliar canonical scholarship has shown a theological concern in the widest sense, that is, a tendency to determine more clearly the place of the juridical in the mystery of the Church."

The fundamental theory of canon law is a discipline covering the basis of canon law in the very nature of the church. Fundamental theory is a newer discipline that takes as is object "the existence and nature of what is juridical in the Church of Jesus Christ." The discipline seeks to better explain the nature of law in the church and engages in theological discussions in post-conciliar Catholicism and seeks to combat "postconciliar antijuridicism".

== Canonistics and qualifications ==
The Second Vatican Council called for the teaching of canon law in clerical training to "take into account the mystery of the Church, according to the dogmatic constitution 'De Ecclesia' (Lumen Gentium)" issued in 1964. Under the 1983 Code of Canon Law, all seminary students are required to take courses in canon law.

Canon law as a field is also called "canonistics". St. Raymond of Penyafort (1175–1275), a Spanish Dominican priest, is the patron saint of canonists, due to his important contributions to canon law in codifying the Decretales Gregorii IX. Other saintly patrons include St. Ivo of Chartres and the Jesuit St. Robert Bellarmine.

Academic degrees covering canon law include the J.C.B. (Iuris Canonici Baccalaureatus, Bachelor of Canon Law, normally taken as a graduate degree), J.C.L. (Iuris Canonici Licentiatus, Licentiate of Canon Law) and the J.C.D. (Iuris Canonici Doctor, Doctor of Canon Law). Those with a J.C.L. or higher are usually called "canonists" or "canon lawyers". Because of its specialized nature, advanced degrees in civil law or theology are normal prerequisites for the study of canon law.

Some ecclesiastical officials are required to have the doctorate (JCD) or at least the licentiate (JCL) in canon law in order to fulfill their functions, namely judicial vicars, judges, promoters of justice, defenders of the bond, and canonical advocates. In addition, vicars general and episcopal vicars are to be doctors, or at least licensed in canon law or theology. Ordinarily, bishops are to have an advanced degree (doctorate or at least licentiate) in scripture, theology, or canon law.

== See also ==
- Apostolic Administrator
- Canon Episcopi
- Canonical act
- Canonical admonitions
- Confirmation of bishops
- Devil's advocate
- Ecclesiastical court
- Funeral dues
- Integralism
- Particular church
- Privilege (canon law)
- Privilege of competency
- Rector (ecclesiastical)
- Prohibited degree of kinship
- Secular clergy
- Sede vacante
- Simony
- Supreme Tribunal of the Apostolic Signatura
- Team of priests in solidum
- Territorial abbot
