= Interpretation (Catholic canon law) =

Rules for interpreting words

Regarding the canon law of the Catholic Church, canonists provide and obey rules for the interpretation and acceptation of words, in order that legislation is correctly understood and the extent of its obligation is determined.

== Authentic interpretation ==
An "authentic interpretation" is an official and authoritative interpretation of a statute issued by the legislator of the statute. In canon law an authentic interpretation has the force of law.

Besides the Supreme Pontiff (Pope), who has plenary legislative power, several other authorities in the Catholic Church have various grades of legislative power. Primary examples are diocesan bishops and their equivalents, episcopal conferences, and particular councils. Any of these legislators can issue authentic interpretations of their own and their predecessors' laws. Authentic interpretations supersede even administrative decisions of ordinaries and judgments of ecclesiastical courts, because neither of these acts have the force of law which authentic interpretations have. The effect of an authentic interpretation is contingent on the extent of the interpretation:

An authentic interpretation which is presented by way of a law has the same force as the law itself, and must be promulgated. If it simply declares the words which are certain in themselves, it has retroactive force. If it restricts or extends a law or explains a doubtful one, it is not retroactive.

Legislators also can entrust the power to authentically interpret their laws to another. For the 1983 Code of Canon Law, the Code of Canons of the Eastern Churches, and other Papal laws, the Supreme Pontiff has delegated authority of authentic interpretation to the Pontifical Council for Legislative Texts. The following table lists the authentic interpretations that this dicastery has issued (with Papal approbation).

=== Table of authentic interpretations ===
Latin Canon(s)	Publication	Summary
Can. 87, §1	AAS, v. 77 (1985), p. 771	Diocesan bishop cannot dispense from canonical form for the marriage of two Catholics.
Can. 119, 1º	AAS, v. 82 (1990), p. 845	Relative majority suffices on the third scrutiny.
Can. 127, §1	AAS, v. 77 (1985), p. 771	Superior does not have the right of voting, unless it is an existing custom in the community.
Can. 230, §2	AAS, v. 86 (1994), p. 541-542	Both lay men and women can serve at the altar.
Cann. 346, §1 and 402, §1	AAS, v. 83 (1991), p. 1093	Bishops emeriti may be elected to the Synod of Bishops.
Cann. 434 and 452	AAS, v. 81 (1989), p. 388	Auxiliary bishops cannot fill office of president of an episcopal conference.
Can. 455, §1 (also cann. 31-3)	AAS, v. 77 (1985), p. 771	"General decrees" includes general executory decrees.
Can. 502, §1	AAS, v. 76 (1984), p. 746-747	Consultor continues in office even when no longer a member of presbyteral council. Consultors need not be replaced unless the minimum required number is lacking.
Can. 509, §1	AAS, v. 81 (1989), p. 991	It is not required to select the president of a chapter of canons by election.
Can. 684, §3	AAS, v. 79 (1987), p. 1249	"Religious" includes religious in temporary vows.
Can. 700	AAS, v. 78 (1986), p. 1323–1324	Religious to be notified of dismissal after confirmation by Holy See. Congregation for Religious and Secular Institutes to receive suspensive recourse against dismissal.
Cann. 705-7	AAS, v. 78 (1986), p. 1323–1324	A religious bishop does not enjoy active and passive voice in his own institute.
Cann. 705-7	AAS, v. 80 (1988), p. 1818–1819	Religious appointed judges of the Roman Rota are not exempt from the religious Ordinary.
Can. 767, §1	AAS, v. 79 (1987), p. 1249	Diocesan bishop cannot dispense from the prescription that the homily is reserved to priests or deacons.
Can. 830, §3	AAS, v. 79 (1987), p. 1249	Imprimaturs must indicate the name of the Ordinary giving his permission, and where and when the permission was given.
Can. 910, §2 (also Can. 230, §3)	AAS, v. 80 (1988), p. 1373	Extraordinary Ministers of Holy Communion cannot exercise their function when ordinary ministers (who are not impeded from distributing the Eucharist) are present in the church, even though not celebrating the Mass.
Can. 917	AAS, v. 76 (1984), p. 746-747	A person may receive Holy Communion on the same day only twice, outside of the danger of death.
Can. 951, §1	AAS, v. 79 (1987), p. 1132	Mass offerings for multiple celebrations on the same day are to be sent to the proper Ordinary of the celebrant.
Can. 964, §2	AAS, v. 90 (1998), p. 711	A priest may choose to hear confession in a confessional with a fixed grille.
Can. 1103	AAS, v. 79 (1987), p. 1132	Force and fear invalidate the matrimonial consent of non-Catholics as well.
Can. 1263	AAS, v. 81 (1989), p. 991	External schools of religious institutes of pontifical right are not subject to taxation by diocesan bishop.
Can. 1367	AAS, v. 91 (1999), p. 918	"Desecration" includes any voluntary and gravely comptemptuous action towards the Eucharistic species.
Can. 1398	AAS, v. 80 (1988), p. 1818–1819	"Abortion" includes the killing of a fetus in any way whatsoever, at any time from the moment of conception onwards.
Cann. 1522 and 1525	AAS, v. 78 (1986), p. 1324	Can reintroduce a case in another tribunal after instance is finished through preemption or renunciation.
Can. 1673, 3º	AAS, v. 78 (1986), p. 1323–1324	The judicial vicar of the interdiocesan tribunal of the respondent cannot give the consent required for hearing a nullity case in the diocese of the plaintiff.
Can. 1686 (also Cann. 1066–7)	AAS, v. 76 (1984), p. 746-747	The pre-nuptial investigation suffices to determine the invalidity of a prior marriage due to lack of canonical form; a declaration of nullity via the documentary process is not required.
Can. 1737 (also Can. 299, §3)	AAS, v. 80 (1988), p. 1818	A non-juridical group with a grievance must take hierarchical recourse as individuals.

== Rules of interpretation ==
In general, the authentic interpretation of a law may be made by the legislator or his successor or superior, but when this is not the case recourse must be had to what is called magisterial, or doctrinal, interpretation. It is for this latter mode that rules have been formed.

=== Words ===
The specific words of a law are understood according to their usual signification, unless it is certain that the legislator intended them to be understood otherwise. When words are unambiguous, they must not be twisted into another, improbable signification. If the intention of the legislator regarding words in question is known, interpretation must accord therewith, rather than with the usual signification of the words, because in this instance the words are said not to be nude but rather clothed with the will of the legislator.

When a law is stated in general terms, it is presumed that no exception was intended; that is, if the general law states no exception, interpreters may not distinguish specific cases. Regarding all interpretations, however, that signification of the words in question is to be preferred that favors equity rather than strict justice. An argument can be made from the contrary signification of the words, provided that it does produce a result that is absurd, inappropriate, or contradicted by another law. Further, the provisions of a prior statute are presumed not to be changed beyond the express signification of the words of a new law.

When a law is penal in nature, its words are to be construed in their strictest sense and not to be extended to cases that are not explicitly stated, but when a law concedes favors, its words are to be interpreted in their widest sense. "In contracts, words are to be taken in their full [plena] meaning, in last wills in a wider [plenior] sense, and in grants of favours in their widest [plenissimi] interpretation". When the signification of words is doubtful, that sense is to be preferred that does not prejudice the rights of a third person, i. e., a person whom the law does not directly affect or concern.

Words of a law are never presumed to be superfluous. Words must be considered in their context. An interpretation of words that renders the law in question futile is a false interpretation. When words are in the future tense, and even when they are in the imperative mood regarding the judge, but not regarding the crime, the penalty is understood to be incurred not ipso facto but only upon judicial sentence. When words are doubtful they must be presumed to favor the subjects thereof and not the legislator.

== Benedict XVI's opinion ==
According to Benedict XVI, the instructions of the Magisterium regarding canon law and its interpretation are binding per se insofar as it teaches of the law. The juridically binding instructions on canonical interpretation of the Magisterium are primarily given in the allocutions of the Supreme Pontiffs to the Tribunal of the Roman Rota.

Pope Benedict XVI, in his address of 21 January 2012 to the Roman Rota, taught that canonical law can only be interpreted and fully understood within the Catholic Church in the light of her mission and ecclesiological structure, and that "the work of the interpreter must not be deprived of "vital contact with ecclesial reality":

All things considered, the hermeneutics of canonical laws is most closely tied to the very understanding of the law of the Church....In such realistic prospectiveness, the interpretative undertaking, at times arduous, takes on meaning and purpose. The use of the interpretive meaning foreseen by the Code of Canon Law in can. 17, beginning with "the proper meaning of the words considered in their text and context", is no longer a mere logical exercise. It has to do with an assignment that is vivified by an authentic contact with the comprehensive reality of the Church, which allows one to penetrate the true meaning of the letter of the law. Something then occurs, similar to what I said about the inner process of St Augustine in biblical hermeneutics: "the transcending of the letter has rendered the letter itself credible". (Note: Benedict XVI, 2012 Roman Rota Address, citing Post-Synodal Apostolic Exhortation Verbum Domini, 30 September 2010, 38: AAS 102 (2010), p. 718, n. 38.) In such a manner, also in the hermeneutics of the law is it confirmed that the authentic horizon is that of the juridical truth to love, to seek out and to serve. It follows that the interpretation of canonical law must take place within the Church. This is not a matter of mere external circumstance, subject to the environs: it is a calling to the same humus of Canon Law and the reality regulated by it. Sentire cum Ecclesia takes on meaning also within the discipline, by reason of the doctrinal foundations that are always present and operative within the legal norms of the Church. In this manner, is also applied to Canon Law that hermeneutics of renewal in continuity of which I spoke in reference to the Second Vatican Council (Note: Benedict XVI, 2012 Roman Rota Address, citing his Discourse to the Roman Curia of 22 December 2005: AAS 98 (2006), pp. 40-53., https://w2.vatican.va/content/benedict-xvi/en/speeches/2005/december/documents/hf_ben_xvi_spe_20051222_roman-curia.html) so closely bound to the current canonical legislation. Christian maturity leads one to love the law ever more and want to understand it and to apply it faithfully.

== Bibliography ==
- New Commentary on the Code of Canon Law, ed. by John P. Beal, James A. Coriden, and Thomas J. Green, Paulist Press, 2000. ISBN 978-0-8091-0502-1 (hardback), ISBN 978-0-8091-4066-4 (paperback, 2002).
- Code of Canon Law Annotated, second English edition, ed. by Ernest Caparros, Michel Thériault, and Jean Thorn, 2004. ISBN 978-2-89127-629-0 (Wilson and Lafleur), ISBN 978-1-890177-44-7 (Midwest Theological Forum).
- Lawrence G. Wrenn, Authentic Interpretations on the 1983 Code, Canon Law Society of America, 1993. ISBN 978-0-943616-61-2.
- Pope Benedict XVI, Address of His Holiness Benedict XVI for the Inauguration of the Judicial Year of the Tribunal of the Roman Rota, 21 January 2012, https://w2.vatican.va/content/benedict-xvi/en/speeches/2012/january/documents/hf_ben-xvi_spe_20120121_rota-romana.html, accessed 29 March 2016.

Attribution

- The entry cites:
  - Ethelred Taunton, The Law of the Church (London, 1906), s.v.;
  - Lucius Ferraris, Bibl. Can., 5 (Rome, 1889), s.v. Lex.
