= Communitas perfecta =

Theory of the Catholic Church

Communitas perfecta ("perfect community") or societas perfecta ("perfect society") is the Latin name given to one of several ecclesiological, canonical, and political theories of the Catholic Church. The doctrine teaches that the church is a self-sufficient or independent group which already has all the necessary resources and conditions to achieve its overall goal (final end) of the universal salvation of mankind. It has historically been used in order to define church–state relations and to provide a theoretical basis for the legislative powers of the church in the philosophy of Catholic canon law.

== Communitas perfecta in Aristotle ==
Its origins can be traced to the Politics of Aristotle, who described the Polis as a whole made of several imperfect parts, i.e. the consummation of natural communities such as the family and the village. The "perfect community" was originally developed as a theory of political society. The most sovereign political organization (the Polis) can attain the end of the community as a whole (happiness) better than any of the subordinate parts of the community (family, village, etc.). Since it can attain its end (telos) by its own powers and the resources within itself, then it is self-sufficient. It is self-sufficiency that is the defining element of the polis.

== Scholastic development ==
The idea of "perfect community" was also present in medieval philosophy. In direct reference to Aristotle, Thomas Aquinas mentions the state (civitas) as a perfect community (communitas perfecta):

As one man is a part of the household, so a household is a part of the state: and the state is a perfect community, according to Polit. i, 1. And therefore, as the good of one man is not the last end, but is ordained to the common good; so too the good of one household is ordained to the good of a single state, which is a perfect community. Consequently he that governs a family, can indeed make certain commands or ordinances, but not such as to have properly the force of law.

Aquinas never referred to the church as a perfect community in his writings. If Aquinas and medieval writers had any notion of communitas perfecta being applied to the church, it was not clearly expressed and was not a clear basis for the societas perfecta theory used in later controversies between church and state.

== Popes' uses ==
Leo XIII, in his encyclical Immortale Dei, explains this teaching in relation to the Catholic Church:

it is a society chartered as of right divine, perfect in its nature and in its title, to possess in itself and by itself, through the will and loving kindness of its Founder, all needful provision for its maintenance and action. And just as the end at which the Church aims is by far the noblest of ends, so is its authority the most exalted of all authority, nor can it be looked upon as inferior to the civil power, or in any manner dependent upon it.

The two perfect societies correspond to two forces, the church and state, Leo XIII further states:

The Almighty, therefore, has given the charge of the human race to two powers, the ecclesiastical and the civil, the one being set over divine, and the other over human, things. Each in its kind is supreme, each has fixed limits within which it is contained, limits which are defined by the nature and special object of the province of each

Benedict XV wrote:

The Church, a most wise Mother, wanted by Christ, her Founder, in such a way that she possessed all the characteristics of a perfect society, from her earliest beginnings, when according to the task assigned to her by the Lord, she began to educate and govern all peoples, she gave herself to regulate and defend the conduct of consecrated persons and of the Christian people with certain laws.

== Developments in the post-conciliar period ==
Until the Second Vatican Council, the doctrine of the two perfect societies of Leo XIII was held to be official in theological studies. During the council itself, as well as in the new 1983 Code of Canon Law itself, the doctrine was no longer explicitly mentioned and the Aristotelian "Perfect Community" was all but replaced by the biblical "People of God". In the modern Catholic post-conciliar theology, its discussion is limited to theologians and academics. Its near-abandonment in discourse has proven controversial.

In any event, Pope Paul VI mentioned it and summarized it in the 1969 motu proprio Sollicitudo omnium ecclesiarum on the tasks of the papal legate:

It cannot be disputed that the duties of Church and State belong to different orders. Church and state are in their own area perfect societies. That means: They have their own legal system and all necessary resources. They are also, within their respective jurisdiction, entitled to apply its laws. On the other hand, it must not be overlooked that they are both aiming at a similar welfare, namely that the people of God is to obtain eternal salvation.
