= Treatise on Law =

Work of legal philosophy by Thomas Aquinas

Treatise on Law is Thomas Aquinas' major work of legal philosophy. It forms questions 90–108 of the Prima Secundæ ("First [Part] of the Second [Part]") of the Summa Theologiæ, Aquinas' masterwork of Scholastic philosophical theology. Along with Aristotelianism, it forms the basis not only for the legal theory of Catholic canon law, but provides a model for natural law theories generally.

== Aquinas' notion of law ==
Aquinas defines a law as "an ordinance of reason for the common good, made by him who has care of the community, and promulgated."

Law is an ordinance of reason because it must be reasonable or based in reason and not merely in the will of the legislator. It is for the common good because the end or telos of law is the good of the community it binds, and not merely the good of the lawmaker or a special interest group. It is made by the proper authority who has "care of the community", and not arbitrarily imposed by outsiders. It is promulgated so that the law can be known.

He says:

Thus from the four preceding articles [of Question 90], the definition of law may be gathered; and it is nothing else than an ordinance of reason for the common good, made by him who has care of the community, and promulgated.

Strictly speaking, this is a definition of human law. The term "law" as used by Aquinas is equivocal, meaning that the primary meaning of law is "human law", but other, analogous concepts are expressed with the same term.

== Kinds of law ==
The Treatise on Law deals with Aquinas view’s on the objective ethical aspect of human decision-making. Aquinas presents a question and then puts each question into article raising specific questions he has. The first three questions are broken down in four topics concerning the essence of law, the effects of law, and the eternal law.

The first question (Question 90 of the larger Summa) is on the essence of law. Aquinas breaks the question down into four articles. The first article is on law's relation to reason. Aquinas believes that reason is the first thing human acts upon; “the source in any kind of thing is the measure and rule of that kind of thing…and so we conclude that law belongs to reason.” The second is on law's relation to the common good. He states that we cannot find common good without reason; it guides us to common happiness through law. The third article is concerned with whether any person's reason is enough to make laws. The fourth article is concerned with whether promulgation is essential to law. Promulgation is important so that the law can achieve force. By the end of the fourth article Aquinas comes up with his definition on law, “Law is an ordination of reason for the common good by one who has care for the community, and promulgated.”

Question 91 is on the different kinds of law. Aquinas establishes four types of laws: eternal law, natural law, human law, and divine law. He states that eternal law, or God's providence, "rules the world… his reason evidently governs the entire community in the universe.” Aquinas believes that eternal law is all God’s doing. Natural law is the participation in the eternal law by rational creatures. Natural law allows us to decide between good and evil. Next we have Human Law; particular applications of law resulting by reason. “Human law originally sprang from nature.” The last is Divine law which is important because “it belongs to any law to be directed to the common good at its end.” These laws all go together and the relationship must be presented to comprehend them individually.

Question 92 is the effects of laws. The first article asks "Is the Effect of Law to Make Human Beings Good?" Aquinas feels in order for law to make people good that law needs to guide people to their right virtue. “Therefore, since virtue makes those possessing it good, the proper effect of law is consequently to make its subject good, either absolutely or in some respect.” The second article of Question 92 is "Whether the acts of law are suitably assigned?" This article focuses on what acts consist of; namely, “commanding, forbidding, permitting, and punishing.” Aquinas believes that some human acts are good and some are evil.

=== Natural law ===
Natural law or the law of nature refers to normative properties that are inherent by virtue of human nature and universally cognizable through human reason. Historically, natural law refers to the use of reason to analyze both social and personal human nature to deduce binding rules of moral behavior. The law of nature, being determined by nature, is universal.

=== Eternal law ===
Question 93 focuses on the Eternal as a whole. Aquinas is asking, is the eternal law the supreme plan in God? Aquinas argues whether or not if the eternal law is a plan of God. He says “God made each thing with its own nature. Therefore, the eternal law is not the same as divine plan.” (93.1) Augustine contradicts this idea by stating “the eternal law is the supreme plan that we should always obey.” Aquinas believes that the eternal law “is simply the plan of divine wisdom that directs all the actions and movements of created things.” (93.1) He says that God is above all else. That he creates everything in the universe. Human beings participate in eternal law in two ways: by action and by cognition. “The virtuous are completely subjects to the eternal law, as they always act in accord with.” Aquinas believes people who are truthful act according to the eternal law.

=== Human law ===
For Aquinas, human law is only valid if it conforms to natural law. If a law is unjust, then it is not actually a law, but a "perversion of law".

== Layout ==
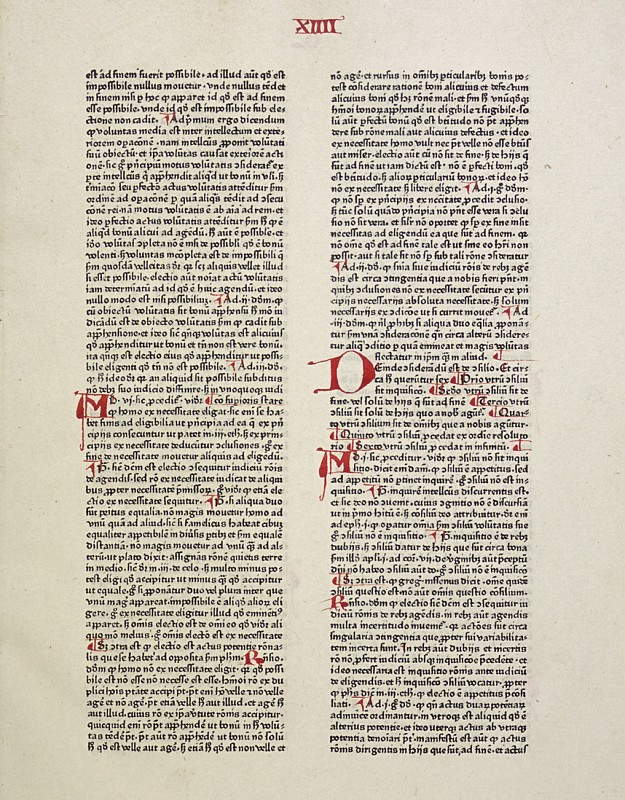
Summa theologica, Pars secunda, prima pars. (copy by Peter Schöffer, 1471)

The Treatise on Law (as part of the Summa Theologica) is divided into Articles (or broad topics) and Questions (or specific topics). The Questions each argue for a single thesis and defend it against objections. The division is as follows:

1. IN GENERAL

Q. 90: Of the Essence of Law (the rationality, end, cause, and promulgation of law)
Q. 91: Of the Various Kinds of Law (eternal, natural, human, divine, sin laws)
Q. 92: Of the Effects of Law

2. IN PARTICULAR

Q. 93: Of the Eternal Law
Q. 94: Of the Natural Law
Q. 95: Of Human Law
Q. 96: Of the Power of Human Law
Q. 97: Of Change in Laws
Q. 98: Of the Old Law
Q. 99: Of the Precepts of the Old Law
Q. 100: Of the Moral Precepts of the Old Law
Q. 101: Of the Ceremonial Precepts in Themselves
Q. 102: Of the Causes of the Ceremonial Precepts
Q. 103: Of the Duration of the Ceremonial Precepts
Q. 104: Of the Judicial Precepts
Q. 105: Of the Reason for the Judicial Precepts
Q. 106: Of the Law of the Gospel, Called the New Law, Considered in Itself
Q. 107: Of the New Law as Compared with the Old
Q. 108: Of Those Things That Are Contained in the New Law

== Legacy ==
William S. Brewbaker III has called it "perhaps the most famous of metaphysical legal texts”, while Robert M. Hutchins declared it “that greatest of all books on the philosophy of law”.

== See also ==
- Thomas Aquinas
- Christian views on the Old Covenant
- Determinatio
- Natural law
- Philosophy of law
- Philosophy, theology, and fundamental theory of Catholic canon law
