= Haberget =

Medieval English cloth named in the Magna Carta

Haberget (halberget, hauberget, halberject) was a kind of cloth described in Magna Carta of 1215, whose precise nature is not certain; the New Oxford English Dictionary defined it only as "a kind of cloth". A 1968 review by the Society for Medieval Archaeology of the UK proposed that it was a woollen cloth known for a broken diamond texture that was produced by early looms.

As one of three kinds of cloth named in Magna Carta and in a variety of other medieval sources, it is believed to have been a major article of commerce in the 12th and 13th centuries. The cloth could be dyed green, 'peacock', dark brown, or in grain, and was available in coarse, good, or fine qualities, selling from 5.5d. to 4s. a yard. As such it could compete with other cloths used by the poor, or might be of a grade suitable for royalty.

The texture of the cloth is believed to have superficially resembled a hauberk (chain mail) due to the pattern of horizontal rows, known as a 'broken diamond' or 'broken lozenge' twill, which has been excavated from peat bogs dating back to the 4th century AD. Made of worsted yarn, the pattern is not obliterated by heavy pounding. In Iceland, Norway, and Sweden such cloth is referred to as hringofann, meaning "hauberk", a term persisting to the present day.
