= People of God =

Religious term

People of God (Hebrew: עם האלהים) is a term used in the Hebrew Bible to refer to the Israelites and used in Christianity to refer to Christians.

== In the Bible ==
=== Hebrew Bible and Old Testament ===
In the Hebrew Bible and Old Testament, the Israelites are referred to as "the people of God" in Judges 20:2 and 2 Samuel 14:13. The phrases "the people of the Lord" and "the people of the Lord your God" are also used. In those texts God is also represented as speaking of the Israelites as "my people". The people of God was a term first used by God in the Book of Exodus, as part of the covenant between Israel and God (Exodus 6:7).

=== New Testament ===
In the New Testament, the expression "people of God" is found in Hebrews 4:9 and 11:25. The expression "his people" (that is, God's people) appears in Revelation 21:3, and "my people" in Revelation 18:4. 2 Corinthians 6:16 mentions the same promises to the New Testament believer "I will dwell in them, and walk in them; and I will be their God, and they shall be my people", which is a parallel to Ezekiel 37:27.

Romans 9:25–26, also quotes/refers to Hosea 1:10 and Hosea 2:23.

As He says also in Hosea: "I will call them My people, who were not My people, And her beloved, who was not beloved." "And it shall come to pass in the place where it was said to them, 'You are not My people,' There they shall be called sons of the living God."

== Christianity ==
Continued use of the expression "people of God" (in Latin, populus Dei) in the writings of the Church Fathers are found in Augustine's De civitate Dei and Pope Leo I's Lenten Sermon. Its use continued up to and including Pope John XXIII's apostolic letter Singulari studio of 1 July 1960, two years before the Second Vatican Council.

In Gaelic, Latin populus Dei became pobal Dé and has continued for centuries to be an expression in everyday use for the Church in a parish, a diocese or the world.

=== Catholic Church ===
==== Second Vatican Council ====
The phrase has been given greater prominence within the Catholic Church because of its employment in documents of the Second Vatican Council (1962–1965).

The dogmatic constitution Lumen gentium devoted its chapter II to "the new People of God", "a people made up of Jew and gentile", called together by Christ (section 9). It spoke of "the people to whom the testament and the promises were given and from whom Christ was born according to the flesh" as among those who "are related in various ways to the people of God" (section 16). It described in detail the qualities of this People of God in words "intended for the laity, religious and clergy alike" (section 30), while also pointing out the specific duties and functions of the different ranks of which it is composed, such as that of "those who exercise the sacred ministry for the good of their brethren" (section 13).

In 2001, Cardinal Joseph Ratzinger, who was to become Pope Benedict XVI in 2005, stated that the council's choice of this term reflected three perspectives. The principal one was to introduce a term that could serve as an ecumenical bridge, recognizing intermediate degrees of belonging to the church. Another was to put more in evidence the human element in the church, which is also part of her nature. And the third was to recall that the church has not yet reached her final state and that she "will not be wholly herself until the paths of time have been traversed and have blossomed in the hands of God".

Ratzinger also declared that the term is not to be understood in way that would reduce it "to an a-theological and purely sociological view" of the church. Michael Hesemann wrote:

After the Council, the expression was taken up enthusiastically, but in a way that neither Ratzinger nor the Council Fathers had intended. Suddenly it became a slogan: "We are the People!" The idea of a "Church from below" developed; its proponents wanted to engage in polemics against those who held office and o carry out their agenda by democratic majority vote. Although the theological, biblical concept of people was still the idea of a natural hierarchy, of a great family, suddenly it was reinterpreted in a Marxist sense, in which "people" is always considered the antithesis to the ruling classes. The centre of the Christian faith, however, can only be God's revelation, which cannot be put to a ballot. Church is being called by God. Joseph Ratzinger said: 'The crisis concerning the Church, as it is reflected in the crisis concerning the concept "People of God", is a "crisis about God"; it is the result of leaving out what is most essential.

While the council distinguished between the Jewish people and "the new People of God", Carl E. Braaten has said that, being somewhat analogous to the expression "chosen people", the term "People of God" suggests a persisting trend of supersessionism in the church, and that the expression "People of God" implying that the church is the same people as Abraham, Isaac and Jacob in the Hebrew Bible.

==== Since the Second Vatican Council ====
Pope Paul VI used the phrase with regard to his profession of faith known as the Credo of the People of God. Pope John Paul II used it in his catechetical instructions, teaching that the church is the new people of God. Pope Benedict XVI has spoken of "the Church, the people of God throughout the world, united in faith and love and empowered by the Spirit to bear witness to the risen Christ to the ends of the earth". On 20 August 2018, Pope Francis released a letter, addressed to the "People of God", in response to recent revelations of sexual abuse cases within the Church, quoting St. Paul: "If one member suffers, all suffer together with it" (1 Corinthians 12:26).

The concluding messages of each General Assembly of the Synod of Bishops are addressed to "the People of God".

==== Catechism ====
The Catechism of the Catholic Church devotes a section to describing the church with this phrase, and indicates the characteristics of the people of God "that distinguish it from all other religious, ethnic, political, or cultural groups found in history", so that it does not belong to any one of these groups. Membership in the people of God, it says, comes not by physical birth but by faith in Christ and baptism. Hence, the people of God includes Roman Catholic hierarchy.

== See also ==
- Christian Church
- Communitas perfecta, doctrinal theories regarding the Catholic Church
- Divine filiation, Christian doctrine regarding Jesus and Christians
- Jews as the chosen people
- Mystici corporis Christi, 1943 papal encyclical stating that the Mystical Body of Christ is identical with the Catholic Church
- Supersessionism, the Christian doctrine which asserts that the New Covenant through Jesus Christ supersedes the Old Covenant, which was made exclusively with the Jewish people.
