= Determinatio =

Term in natural and Catholic law jurisprudence

A determinatio is an authoritative determination by the legislator concerning the application of practical principles, that is not necessitated by deduction from natural or divine law but is based on the contingencies of practical judgement within the possibilities allowed by reason. The concept derives from the legal philosophy of Thomas Aquinas, and continues to be a part of discussions in natural law theory.

In natural law jurisprudence, determinatio is the process of making natural law into positive law.

In Catholic canon law, determinatio is the act by which natural law or divine positive law is made determinate in the canonical legal system as specific norms of law, although the content of such law is still essentially that of divine law, which, together with canon law, forms "a single juridical system of law".

== Catholic canon law ==
Determinatio is a legal doctrine in the jurisprudence of the canon law of the Catholic Church. It was imported from the legal philosophy of Thomas Aquinas.

The general norms of divine or natural law serve as "shaping factors" and "a necessary basis" for the human-made canon law, but such general norms in themselves cannot have a greater legal effect until they are made into specific human laws, since the norms of divine law are "general and non-specific".

But in the movement from the general to the concrete, there are sometimes many possibilities; that is, divine or natural law can be made concrete in many different ways, and all the legitimate alternatives are in line with the requirements of divine law. Wherefore the legislator must make a determinatio and "opt or choose among them".
