= Privilege of competency =

Right of a cleric to proper sustenance

The privilege of competency is, in Catholic canon law, the right of a cleric to proper sustenance.

When a parochial church has been incorporated with a collegiate institution or monastery and a vicar has been appointed to the cure of souls in the parish, the possessors of the benefice are obliged to give him the needful salary. Nor can the right to this competency be done away with by agreement. If a private contract be made by which a less sum is to be accepted, it will not bind the successor of the contracting vicar. Even if the contract be approved by public authority, it is not binding unless an amount sufficient for the proper support of the pastor be stipulated. The right to competency also has place when several simple benefices are united with a parish church. If the endowment is not sufficient for the necessary number of pastors, then recourse is to be had to firstfruits, tithes, and collections among the parishioners.

It is the duty of the bishop to see that those who have the care of souls be provided with proper support.
