= Implied repeal =

Concept in constitutional theory

The doctrine of implied repeal is a concept in constitutional theory which states that where an act of Parliament or an act of Congress (or of some other legislature) conflicts with an earlier one, the later Act takes precedence and the conflicting parts of the earlier Act become legally inoperable. This doctrine is expressed in the Latin phrases leges posteriores priores contrarias abrogant (later laws abrogate earlier, conflicting laws) and lex posterior derogat priori (a later law repeals an earlier one).

Implied repeal is to be contrasted with the express repeal of legislation by the legislative body.

== Canada ==
In Canadian law, it is possible for a law to be protected from implied repeal by way of a "primacy clause" which states that the act in question supersedes all other statutes until it is specifically repealed. Acts with such primacy clauses are called quasi-constitutional.

== United Kingdom ==
In the 2002 English case Thoburn v Sunderland City Council (the so-called "Metric Martyrs" case), Lord Justice Laws held that some constitutionally significant statutes hold a higher status in UK law and are not subject to the doctrine of implied repeal. The case specifically dealt with s.2(2) of the European Communities Act, but in his judgment Lord Justice Laws also held the view that the Parliament Acts and the Human Rights Act are "constitutional statutes" and in his opinion may not be subject to the doctrine of implied repeal.

A decade later in 2012, in a case before the United Kingdom Supreme Court, BH v The Lord Advocate (Scotland), Lord Hope held that "the Scotland Act can only be expressly repealed; it cannot be impliedly repealed; that is because of its 'fundamental constitutional nature'."

== United States ==
Under United States law, "implied repeal" is a disfavored doctrine. That is, if a court can reconcile the two statutes with any reasonable interpretation, that interpretation is preferred to one that treats the earlier statute as invalidated by the later one.

The Wisconsin Supreme Court ruled (Note: The 2025 Wisconsin Supreme Court decision was divided along ideological lines, with the four liberal justices voting the 1849 law should be considered repealed and the three conservatives voting it should be enacted. One of the conservative justices, Annette Ziegler, wrote in dissent that the majority was carrying out "a jaw-dropping exercise of judicial will, placing personal preference over the constitutional roles of the three branches of our state government and upending a duly enacted law ... The majority’s analysis is fundamentally flawed, and the majority is compromised when it comes to the issue of abortion.") in July 2025 that an 1849 law, that stated the killing of a fetus was manslaughter and thusly interpreted by anti-abortion advocates to outlaw abortion upon the overturning of Roe v. Wade via Dobbs v. Jackson in 2022, was "impliedly repealed". Among the cases cited by the majority in the 2025 ruling was a 1994 Wisconsin Supreme Court ruling that found the 1849 law only applied when the fetus died as an indirect result of an assault upon the pregnant person.

== See also ==
- Desuetude
- Derogation
- Obrogation
