= Obrogation =

Modification or repeal of a law implicit in a later law

In civil law, obrogation (Latin: obrogat from obrogare) is the modification or repeal of a law in whole or in part by issuing a new law.

In the canon law of the Catholic Church, obrogation is the enacting of a contrary law that is a revocation of a previous law; it may also be the partial cancellation or amendment of a law, decree, or legal regulation by the imposition of a newer one.

== Catholic Church ==
The 1983 Code of Canon Law governs here in canon 53:

If decrees are contrary one to another, where specific matters are expressed, the specific prevails over the general; if both are equally specific or equally general, the one later in time obrogates the earlier insofar as it is contrary to it.

This canon incorporates Rule 34 in VI of the Regulae Iuris: "Generi per speciem derogatur" or "The specific derogates from the general."

== See also ==
- Repeal
- Conflict of laws
- Implied repeal
- Naskh (tafsir)
