= Repeal =

Removal or reversal of a law

A repeal (O.F. rapel, modern rappel, from rapeler, rappeler, revoke, re and appeler, appeal) is a removal or reversal of a law. There are two basic types of repeal; a repeal with a re-enactment is used to replace the law with an updated, amended, or otherwise related law, or a repeal without replacement so as to abolish its provisions altogether.

In the United Kingdom and Ireland, the removal of secondary legislation is normally referred to as a revocation rather than a repeal. Under the common law of England and Wales, the effect of repealing a statute was "to obliterate it completely from the records of Parliament as though it had never been passed." This, however, is now subject to savings provisions within the Interpretation Act 1978.

In parliamentary procedure, the motion to rescind, repeal, or annul is used to cancel or countermand an action or order previously adopted by the assembly.

== Partial or full repeals ==
A partial repeal occurs when a specified part or provision of a previous Act is repealed but other provisions remain in force. For example, the Acts of Union 1800, providing for the union between the formerly separate kingdoms of Great Britain and Ireland as the United Kingdom, was partially repealed in 1922, when (as a consequence of the 1921 Anglo-Irish Treaty), twenty-six of the thirty-two counties of Ireland were constituted as the Irish Free State, and ceased to form part of the United Kingdom.

A full repeal occurs where the entire Act in question is repealed.

== Repeal with or without re-enactment ==
A typical situation where an act is repealed and re-enacted is where the law in the area is being updated but the law being repealed needs to be replaced with one suitable for the modern era. Re-enactment can be with or without amendment, although repeal and re-enactment without amendment normally occurs only in the context of a consolidation bill (a bill to consolidate the law in a particular area).

For example, the repeal of the Poor Laws in England in 1948 reflected their replacement by modern social welfare legislation.

A repeal without replacement is generally done when a law is no longer effective, or it is shown that a law is having far more negative consequences than were originally envisioned.

If a campaign for the repeal of a particular law gains particular momentum, an advocate of the repeal might become known as a "repealer". The Repeal Association in 19th-century Ireland advocated Irish independence through repeal of the Acts of Union 1800.

Many repeals without replacement are the result of significant changes in society. Major examples include:

- The old Jim Crow laws or blue laws in the US
- The Corn Laws in England, repealed in 1846 after a passionate campaign.
- Repeal of Prohibition in the United States. Enacted by the Eighteenth Amendment to the United States Constitution, prohibition of alcoholic beverages was repealed by the Twenty-first Amendment. This is the only constitutional amendment to have ever been repealed in the United States.
- The massive Statute Law Revision Act 2007 in the Republic of Ireland, through which 3,225 Acts were repealed, dating back over eight centuries to 1171 and the earliest laws enacted by England when it began its invasion of Ireland. The statutes repealed include a number of Acts of significant historical interest, including an Act of 1542 providing that the Kings of England shall be Kings of Ireland. This Act is the largest single repealing statute in the history of Ireland.

== Express or implied repeal ==
The repeal of a statute may be either express or implied.

Express repeal occurs where express words are used in a statute to repeal an earlier statute. They are now usually included in a table in a schedule to the statute, for reasons of convenience.

In the United States, when a bill is passed by the House and Senate and signed by the president, or Congress overrides a presidential veto, the various provisions contained within the newly enacted law are rearranged according to their policy content and cataloged in the United States Code—a compilation of the general and permanent federal laws of the United States. To repeal any element of an enacted law, Congress must pass a new law containing repeal language and the codified statute's location in the U.S. Code (including the title, chapter, part, section, paragraph and clause). In this way, Congress (and the president) must follow the same rules and procedures for passing any law. When statutes are repealed, their text is simply deleted from the Code and replaced by a note summarizing what used to be there. Once deleted, the repealed statute no longer has the force of law. All repeals of parts of the US Code are, therefore, express repeals.

Implied repeal occurs where two statutes are mutually inconsistent. The effect is that the later statute repeals the earlier statute pro tanto (in so far as it is inconsistent). As past and future parliaments are equally sovereign, later parliaments can carry out implied repeal of earlier statute by passing an inconsistent statute, but inconsistency needs to be established before implied repeal can occur.

== Repeals with or without savings ==
Repeals can be with or without savings.

A repeal without savings eliminates the repealed statute completely.

A repeal with savings preserves the effect of the repealed statute for limited purposes, such as preventing the reversal of any repeals contained within it, or ensuring that rights granted under its authority are retained. In England and Wales, sections 15 to 17 and 19(2) of the Interpretation Act 1978 set out general savings for all repeals. These re-enact similar provisions from the Interpretation Act 1889, and before 1953 all Statute Law Revision Acts contained a different general savings provision deemed the Westbury saving, which has now fallen out of use. Similar provisions exist in the law of Ireland and other common law countries.

== Parliamentary procedure ==
=== Robert's Rules of Order Newly Revised (RONR) ===
Rescind, repeal, or annul or Amend something previously adopted (RONR)
- Class: Motion that brings a question again before the assembly
- In order when another has the floor?: No
- Requires second?: Yes
- Debatable?: Yes
- May be reconsidered?: Negative vote only
- Amendable?: Yes
- Vote required: Majority with notice; or two-thirds; or majority of entire membership

In meetings of a deliberative assembly, the motions to rescind (or "repeal" or "annul") and amend something previously adopted are used to change action that was taken. They are two forms of the same incidental main motion and they follow the same rules. A motion to postpone an event or action previously scheduled is a particular case of the motion to amend something previously adopted.

Under Robert's Rules of Order, the rules for this motion protect against instability arising from small variations in attendance from one meeting to the next. For this reason, the requirements for changing a previous action are greater than those for taking the action in the first place. A motion to rescind, repeal, annul or amend something already adopted requires a two-thirds vote, a majority vote with previous notice, or a vote of a majority of the entire membership, any one of which would suffice. Demeter's Manual imposes a similar requirement.

When this motion is used in a committee, RONR requires a two-thirds vote unless all committee members who voted for the motion to be rescinded or amended are present or have received ample notice; in which case a majority vote is required.

=== The Standard Code of Parliamentary Procedure (TSC) ===
Under The Standard Code of Parliamentary Procedure, a repeal or amendment of something already adopted requires only the same vote (usually a majority) and notice that was needed to adopt it in the first place. This book states, "As a general rule, fewer than a majority should not be authorized to decide anything, and more than a majority should not be required for most decisions"; the book further states that the problem with situations in which a supermajority is required is that "the minority, not the majority, controls."

=== Legislative use ===
In legislative bodies, the motion to rescind is used for much the same purpose as the motion to reconsider; many court decisions treat the two motions as one motion. However, in legislative contexts, it is not the same as a motion to repeal. The difference between rescind and reconsider is that the motion to rescind is ordinarily applied to actions that have been taken and are already in effect. It has been described as being in the nature of a motion to amend by striking out the entire proposal and leaving nothing remaining. It is not in order when the question can be reached by a motion to reconsider. Once legislation has been actually enacted, it is too late to rescind. The vote required to rescind is the same as would be required to repeal the act which it sought to rescind (usually a majority).

=== Rescind and expunge from the minutes ===
The motion to rescind and expunge from the minutes is used to express the strongest disapproval about action previously taken by a deliberative assembly. Using Roberts Rules of Order Newly Revised, this motion requires a vote of a majority of the entire membership. Using The Standard Code of Parliamentary Procedure, the motion to expunge requires a majority vote (of those voting). The secretary does not erase the expunged motion, but draws a line around it, marks it "expunged by order of this assembly," gives the date of the expunging, and signs the notation. The expunged motion is not included in any minutes published thereafter.

== See also ==
- Reconsideration of a motion
- Obrogation
- Spent enactment
