= Canonical admonitions =

Catholic judicial action

Canonical admonitions are a preliminary means used by the Catholic Church towards a suspected person, as a preventive of harm or a remedy of evil.

Canonical admonitions are part of previous canon law codes. Use of canonical admonition remains a step in the escalating punitive process in both the current 1983 Code of Canon Law of the Latin Church and the Code of Canons of the Eastern Churches of the Eastern Catholic Churches.

== History ==
The 1880 instruction, by direction of Pope Leo XIII, from the Congregation of Bishops and Regulars to the bishops of Italy, gave them the privilege to use a summary procedure in trials of the clergy for criminal or disciplinary transgressions. Article IV decrees: "Among the preservative measures are chiefly to be reckoned the spiritual retreat, admonitions, and injunctions". Article VI: "The canonical admonitions may be made in a paternal and private manner (even by letter or by an intermediary person), or in legal form, but always in such a way that proof of their having been made shall remain on record".

== Usage ==
These admonitions are to be founded upon a suspicion of guilt that is excited by public rumor and investigated by a proper authority, with the result establishing a reasonable basis for the suspicion. If little foundation for the suspicion is discovered, the superior should not even admonish the person, unless the suspected person has given, on previous occasions, serious motive for faultfinding.

Admonitions may be either paternal or legal (canonical). If the grounds are such as to produce a serious likelihood, or half-proof, they will suffice for a paternal admonition. A paternal admonition is administered after the following steps:

- The prelate either personally or through a confidential delegate informs the suspected person of what has been said about him or her, without mentioning the source of information, and without threat, but urges amendment.
- If the suspected party can at once show that there is no basis for suspicion, nothing further is to be done in the matter.
- If his or her denial does not banish their doubts, the prelate should try by persuasion, exhortation, and beseeching to induce him or her to avoid whatever may be a near occasion of wrong, and to repair the harm or scandal given.
- If this is not effective, the prelate may begin the judicial procedure.
- If the proofs at hand are inadequate, this is not advisable. Watchfulness should be used along with negative penalties, such as withholding special offices or by withdrawing those before they are held.
- If the suspect does not answer to the summons, the prelate's suspicion reasonably increases, and a reliable person should interview the suspect and report the results.
- If the suspect refuses to deal with the delegate, a second and a third peremptory call should be made.
- If there is proof of further refusal, with evidence that the summons was received, the suspect is presumed guilty.

Thus the way is paved for the above-mentioned canonical or legal admonition. The assumed half-proof is strengthened, first, by the contumacy of the suspect; secondly, by his confession of the charge in question. An accusation issuing from a reliable person, or a prevalent evil reputation of the suspect, may substitute for the defect of proof needed for indictment.

For the paternal admonition it is enough that this evil reputation should be spread among less responsible persons, but for the legal admonition the evil reputation should emanate from serious and reliable persons. The legal admonition is to a great extent akin to the summons to judgment.

If there is any urgency in the case, one peremptory summons, declaring it to take the place of the three, will suffice. The prelate may still feel that he has not enough evidence to prove the delinquency. He may allow the suspect to purge himself of the suspicion or accusation by his oath and the attestation of two or more reliable persons that they are persuaded of his innocence and that they trust his word. If he cannot find such vouchers for his innocence, and yet there be no strictly legal proof of his guilt (though there are grave reasons for suspicion), the prelate may follow the legal admonition by a special precept or command, according to the character of the suspected delinquency.

The infringement of this precept will entail the right to inflict the penalty which should be mentioned at the time the command is given. This must be done by the prelate or his delegate in a formal legal way before two witnesses and the notary of his curia, be signed by them, and by the suspect if he so desires. The paternal admonition is to be kept secret; the legal admonition is a recognized part of the "acts" for future procedure.
