= Positive law =

Laws that oblige or specify an action

Positive laws (Latin: ius positum or Latin: lex posita) are human-made laws that oblige or specify an action. Positive law also describes the establishment of specific rights for an individual or group. Etymologically, the name derives from the verb to posit.

The concept of positive law is distinct from natural law, which comprises inherent rights, conferred not by act of legislation but by "God, nature, or reason". Positive law is also described as the law that applies at a certain time (present or past) and at a certain place, consisting of statutory law, and case law as far as it is binding. More specifically, positive law may be characterized as "law actually and specifically enacted or adopted by proper authority for the government of an organized jural society."

== Lex humana versus lex posita ==
Thomas Aquinas conflated man-made law (lex humana) and positive law (lex posita or ius positivum). However, there is a subtle distinction between them. Whereas human-made law regards law from the position of its origins (i.e. who it was that posited it), positive law regards law from the position of its legitimacy. Positive law is law by the will of whoever made it, and thus there can equally be divine positive law as there is man-made positive law. Positive Law theory stems from the powers that have enacted it. This type of law is necessary as it is manmade or enacted by the state to protect the rights of the individuals, the governed, to resolve civil disputes and lastly to maintain order and safety in the society. More literally translated, lex posita is posited rather than positive law. In the Summa contra Gentiles Thomas himself writes of divine positive law where he says "Si autem lex sit divinitus posita, auctoritate divina dispensatio fieri potest (if the law be divinely given, dispensation can be granted by divine authority)" and "Lex autem a Deo posita est (But the Law was established by God)". Martin Luther also acknowledged the idea of divine positive law, as did Juan de Torquemada.

Thomas Mackenzie divided the law into four parts, with two types of positive law: divine positive law, natural law, the positive law of independent states, and the law of nations. The first, divine positive law, "concerns the duties of religion" and is derived from revelation. He contrasted it with divine natural law, which is "recognized by reason alone, without the aid of revelation". The third, the positive law of independent states, is the law posited by "the supreme power in the state". It is, in other words, man-made positive law. The fourth, the law of nations, regulates "independent states in their intercourse with each other".

Thomas Aquinas has little difficulty with the idea of both divine positive law and human positive law, since he places no requirements upon the person who posits law that exclude either humans or the divine. However, for other philosophers the idea of both divine and human positive law has proven to be a stumbling block. Thomas Hobbes and John Austin both espoused the notion of an ultimate sovereign. Where Thomism (and indeed Mackenzie) divided sovereignty into the spiritual (God) and the temporal (Mackenzie's "supreme power in the state"), both Hobbes and Austin sought a single, undivided, sovereign as the ultimate source of the law. The problem that this causes is that a temporal sovereign cannot exist if humans are subject to a divine positive law, but if divine positive law does not apply to all humans then God cannot be sovereign either. Hobbes and Austin's answer to this is to deny the existence of divine positive law, and to invest sovereignty in humans, who are, however, subject to divine natural law. The temporal authority is sovereign, and responsible for translating divine natural law into human positive law.

James Bernard Murphy explains: "although our philosophers often seek to use the term positive to demarcate specifically human law, the term and concept are not well suited to do so. All of divine law is positive in source, and much of it is positive in content...."

== Legal positivism ==
This term is also sometimes used to refer to the legal philosophy legal positivism, as distinct from the schools of natural law and legal realism.

Various philosophers have put forward theories contrasting the value of positive law and natural law. The normative theory of law, as put forth by the Brno school, gave pre-eminence to positive law because of its rational nature. Classical liberal and libertarian philosophers usually favor natural law over legal positivism. Positive law, to French philosopher Jean-Jacques Rousseau, was freedom from internal obstacles. Among the foremost proponents of legal positivism in the twentieth century were Hans Kelsen, both in his European years prior to 1940 and in his American years until his death in 1973, and the British philosopher H. L. A. Hart.

== See also ==
- Legal naturalism
- Man-made law
- Natural law
- Natural person in French law
- François Gény (1861–1959), French jurist who introduced notion of "free scientific research" in positive law.
