= Catholic ecclesiology =

Theological study of the Catholic Church

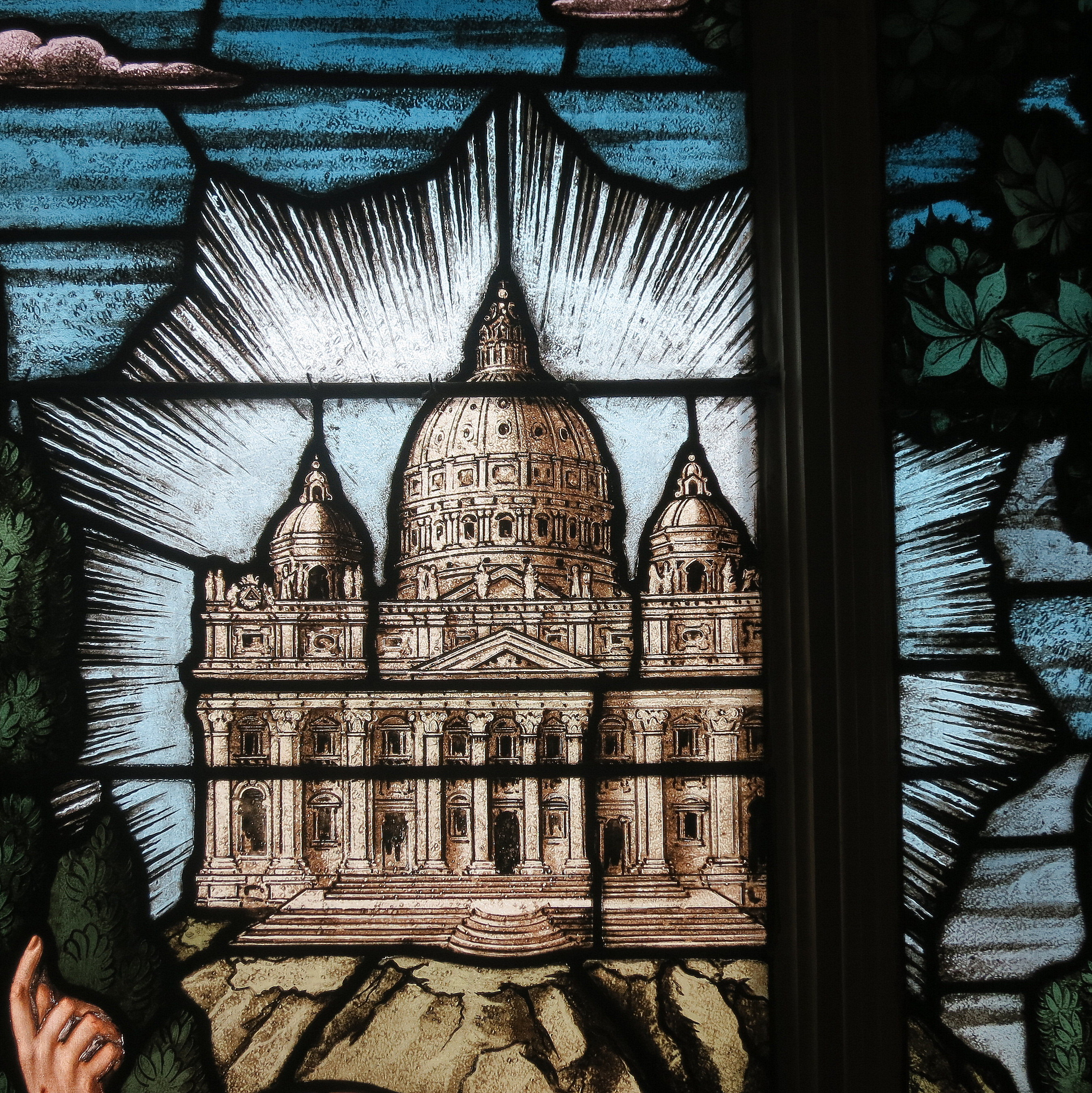
A stained glass window in a Catholic church depicting St. Peter's Basilica in Rome sitting "Upon this rock," a reference to Matthew 16:18. Most present-day Catholics interpret Jesus as saying he was building his church on the rock of the Apostle Peter and the succession of popes which claim Apostolic succession from him.

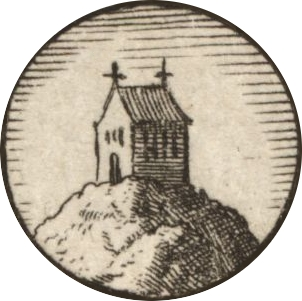
A 17th century illustration of Article VII: Of the Church from the Augsburg Confession, which states "one holy Church is to continue forever. The Church is the congregation of saints, in which the Gospel is rightly taught and the Sacraments are rightly administered." Here the rock from Matthew 16:18 refers to the preaching and ministry of Jesus as the Christ, a view discussed at length in the 1537 Treatise.

Catholic ecclesiology is the theological study of the Catholic Church, its nature, organization and its "distinctive place in the economy of salvation through Christ". Such study shows a progressive development over time being further described in revelation or in philosophy. Here the focus is on the time leading into and since the Second Vatican Council (1962–1965).

Pope Paul VI stressed the importance of the church's self-knowledge in his first encyclical letter, Ecclesiam Suam:

We are convinced that the Church must look with penetrating eyes within itself, ponder the mystery of its own being, and draw enlightenment and inspiration from a deeper scrutiny of the doctrine of its own origin, nature, mission, and destiny.

== Communitas Perfecta ==
The doctrine of Communitas Perfecta ("Perfect Community") or Societas Perfecta ("Perfect Society") teaches that the Church is a self-sufficient or independent society which already has all the necessary resources and conditions to achieve its overall goal (final end) of the universal salvation of all peoples. It has historically been used in order to best define Church-State relations. Its origins are in Aristotelian political philosophy, although its adaptation to ecclesiology was done by the Scholastics. The doctrine was widely used in Neoscholastic circles before the Second Vatican Council.

== Body of Christ ==
This approach of Pius XII moved beyond the "perfect society" model to the "Mystical Body of Christ", a historical designation explained more fully in this document, identifying the Body of Christ with the Catholic Church in a way that would be repeated by the Second Vatican Council. Lumen gentium, after mentioning "Christ, present to us in His Body, which is the Church" (14), goes on to speak of those who are fully incorporated (14), conjoined (15), and related (16) to the Church. This more expansive idea of the Church is developed in the second chapter of Lumen gentium on the "People of God".

The council's decree on ecumenism, Unitatis redintegratio, declares that “The Spirit of Christ has not refrained from using [separated churches and communities] as a means of salvation” (para. 3). This goes beyond the statement in Mystici corporis Christi that says of non-Catholics that “by an unconscious desire and longing they have a certain relationship with the Mystical Body of the Redeemer” (para. 103). Pius XII can be said to have popularized the notion of the Church as the Body of Christ, which was already present in the writings of Saint Paul in the New Testament.

== People of God ==
The second chapter of Lumen gentium is entitled "On the People of God". “People” avoids membership disputes: there are various ways of association; see "Body of Christ" above, which comes from this chapter. Since this chapter of Lumen gentium comes before Chapter 3 "On the Hierarchical Structure of the Church and in particular on the Episcopate", commentators note that it turns the focus from the hierarchy to the laity, declaring that the Holy Spirit "distributes special graces among the faithful of every rank. By these gifts He makes them fit and ready to undertake the various tasks and offices which contribute toward the renewal and building up of the Church" (12).

This is described as a "welcoming judgment on a great mass of theoretical and practical experimentation clamoring for recognition… . The Church´s life does not flow down from Pope thru BB and clergy to a passive laity. It springs up from the grass-roots of the People of God, and the function of authority is co-ordination, authentication and, in exceptional cases, control.”

== Subsistence ==
Subsistence is the doctrine that the Church of Christ "subsists in" the Catholic Church.

Subsistit in is a term taken from Lumen gentium paragraph 8, and is intended to acknowledge that ecclesial elements of the Catholic Church can also be found elsewhere:

This Church constituted and organized in the world as a society, subsists in the Catholic Church, which is governed by the successor of Peter and by the Bishops in communion with him, although many elements of sanctification and of truth are found outside its visible structure.

The theological commission has stated that "the elements which are mentioned concern not only individuals but their communities as well; in this fact precisely is located the foundation of the ecumenical movement."

Those who insist that this is a development in the doctrine of the Church often remark that the Second Vatican Council did not say that the Church of Christ "is" the Catholic Church. However, in another document promulgated on the same day (21 November 1964) as Lumen gentium, the Council did in fact refer to "the Holy Catholic Church, which is the Mystical Body of Christ" (Decree Orientalium ecclesiarum, 2). Here the traditional conventional expression "is" is used, whose clarity can be used to interpret the potential ambiguity of the phrase "subsists in". Then again, the council's decree on Ecumenism stated that "all who have been justified by faith in Baptism are members of Christ's body", although presumably including only those who, in good faith, do not pose an obstacle ("obex") to the reality of the Sacrament through schism or heresy, as Saint Thomas Aquinas taught.

The Second Vatican Council also explicitly states that the one true Church "is" the Catholic Church in its Decree on the Eastern Churches; thus the Council sees no essential difference, or at least views as compatible, the terms "is" and "subsists in". Claiming the identity of the Catholic Church with the body of Christ goes against the understanding presented by more liberal ecclesiologists, such as Yves Congar, Georges Tavard, Joseph A. Komonchak, and Francis A. Sullivan.

== Church Militant, Suffering, and Triumphant ==
These terms were not used to describe the Church either in the Baltimore Catechism of 1885 or in the Catechism of the Catholic Church of 1992. But the latter describes what is meant here when it says: "At the present time some of his disciples are pilgrims on earth. Others have died and are being purified, while still others are in glory." The latter two are commemorated on All Souls' Day (November 2) and All Saints' Day (November 1). .

== Criticism of Catholic ecclesiology ==
=== Eastern Orthodox ===
Roger Haight characterizes the difference in ecclesiologies as "the contrast between a pope with universal jurisdiction and a combination of patriarchal superstructure with an episcopal and synodal communion ecclesiology analogous to that found in Cyprian".

=== Anglican ===
According to the branch theory there are currently branches of the one Church of Christ, each holding the faith of the original undivided Church and maintaining the Apostolic Succession of its bishops. While some limit this to three branches, Roman Catholic, Eastern Orthodox and Anglican Communion churches, others include the Oriental Orthodox, Church of the East, Old Catholic, and Lutheran churches. The Catholic Church has specifically condemned the Branch Theory.

=== Protestant ===
Many Christian churches have nothing approximating the Catholic Sunday celebration of the Mass as sacrifice. This leads to a different understanding of the role of the minister within these churches. At the same time, the notion of the priesthood is evolving within the Catholic church, even as the understanding of sacrifice faces development.
