= Legal history of the Catholic Church =

The Catholic Church utilizes the oldest continuously functioning legal system in the West, evolving much later than Roman Law but predating the evolution of modern Continental European and Latin American Civil Law or Anglophone Common Law traditions. The history of Latin canon law can be divided into four periods: the jus antiquum, the jus novum, the jus novissimum and the Code of Canon Law. In relation to the Code, history can be divided into the jus vetus (all law before the Code) and the jus novum (the law of the Code, or jus codicis). The main sources of Catholic Canon Law from the High Middle Ages to the 1917 Code of Canon Law were collectively known as the Corpus Iuris Canonici (Not to be confused with the Roman Law Corpus Iuris Civilis). Roman Law and Catholic Canon Law share many similarities and the latter was strongly influenced by the former, encapsulated in a popular historical maxim: Ecclesia vivit lege Romana (The Church lives by Roman Law). Eastern Catholic canon laws originated independently but were later heavily influenced by and synthesized with Latin canon law, while Eastern Orthodox, Oriental Orthodox, and Nestorian canon laws developed entirely separately from the East-West schism, Chalcedonian schism, and Nestorian schism, respectively. Protestant canon law originated from Catholic canon law before splitting off following the Reformation.

== Latin canon law ==
=== Jus antiquum ===
The most ancient collections of canonical legislation are certain very early Apostolic documents, known as the Church Orders: for instance, the Didache ton dodeka apostolon or "Teaching of the Twelve Apostles", which dates from the end of the first or the beginning of the 2nd century; the Apostolic Church-Ordinance; the Didascalia, or "Teaching of the Apostles"; the Apostolic Canons and Apostolic Constitutions. These collections have never had any official value, no more than any other collection of this first period. However, the Apostolic Canons and, through it, the Apostolic Constitutions, were influential for a time in that later collections would draw upon these earliest sources of Church law.

It was in the East, after Constantine I's Edict of Milan of toleration (313), that arose the first systematic collections. We cannot so designate the chronological collections of the canons of the councils of the 4th and 5th centuries (314–451); the oldest systematic collection, made by an unknown author in 535, has not come down. The most important collections of this epoch are the Synagoge kanonon, or the collection of John the Scholastic (Joannes Scholasticus), compiled at Antioch about 550, and the Nomocanons, or compilations of civil laws affecting religious matters (nomos) and ecclesiastical laws (kanon). One such mixed collection is dated in the 6th century and has been erroneously attributed to John the Scholastic; another of the 7th century was rewritten and much enlarged by the schismatical ecumenical patriarch Photius (883).

In the Western Church one collection of canons, the Collectio Dionysiana, exercised an influence far beyond the limits of the country in which it was composed. This collection was the work of Dionysius Exiguus, who compiled several collections that now go under the name Dionysiana. Dionysius appears to have done most of his work shortly after the year 600. His collections contain his own Latin translation of the canons of the ancient third-, fourth- and fifth-century councils, excerpts from a (probably) confected collection of African canons (which Dionysius calls the Registrum ecclesiae Carthaginensis, cf. Church of Carthage), and a collection of (38) papal letters (Epistolæ decretales) dating from the reign of Pope Siricius (384–398) to that of Anastasius II (died 498). The influence of this Italian collection grew enormously during the seventh and eighth centuries, especially in England and France. It was continuously enlarged and modified, the most famous modification being a version supposedly send by Pope Adrian I to Charlemagne in 774 and therefore known today as the Collectio Dionysio-Hadriana.

Besides the Dionysiana, Italy also produced two 5th-century Latin translations of the Greek synods known as the Corpus canonum Africano-Romanum and Collectio prisca, both of which are now lost though large portions of them survive in two very large Italian collections known as the Collectio canonum Quesnelliana and Collectio canonum Sanblasiana respectively. In Italy was also produced a popular fifth-century collection of forgeries known today as the Symmachean forgeries. Africa possessed a late fourth-century collection known as the Breviarium Hipponense as well as an early fifth-century collection known as the Codex Apiarii causae; also the Breviatio canonum, or digest of the canons of the councils by Fulgentius Ferrandus (died c. 546), and the Concordia canonum of Cresconius Africanus, an adaptation of the Dionysiana (about 690). In Gaul many important collections were produced, like the collection known today as the Concilium Arelatense secundum and, at the beginning of the 6th century, the Statuta Ecclesiæ antiqua, erroneously attributed to Africa. Also from Gaul/France are the collections known today as the Collectio canonum quadripartita and the Libri duo de synodalibus causis composed by Regino of Prüm. Gaul/France also produced two immensely important collections known as the Collectio canonum vetus Gallica (compiled in Lyons about 600) and the Collectio canonum Dacheriana (about 800), the latter so called from the name of its editor, Luc d'Achéry. The Collectio canonum Hibernensis or Irish collection of canons, compiled in the 8th century, influenced both England, Gaul and (though much later) Italy. Unlike almost every other region, England never produced a 'national' collection, though English personnel played an important role in copying and disseminating Irish and Italian collections in Germany and France. Around the year 700 there developed in either England or Germany a collection of penitential canons attributed to Theodore of Tarsus, Archbishop of Canterbury (died 690). This collection marked a major advance in the development of penitential-canonical collections, which had already been in development for centuries especially within the Irish church. Collections like the one attributed to Theodore were known as penitentials, and were often rather short and simple, most likely because they were meant as handbooks for the use of confessors. There were many such books circulating in Europe from the seventh to the eleventh century, each penitential containing rules indicating exactly how much penance was required for which sins. In various ways these penitentials, mainly Insular in origin, came to affect the larger canon law collections in development on the continent.

Iberia (i.e. Spain) possessed the Capitula Martini, compiled about 572 by Martin, Bishop of Braga (in Portugal), and the immense and influential Collectio Hispana dating from about 633, attributed in the 9th century to Isidore of Seville. In the 9th century arose several apocryphal collections, viz. those of Benedictus Levita, of Pseudo-Isidore (also Isidorus Mercator, Peccator, Mercatus), and the Capitula Angilramni. An examination of the controversies which these three collections give rise to will be found elsewhere (see False Decretals). The Pseudo-Isidorian collection, the authenticity of which was for a long time admitted, has exercised considerable influence on ecclesiastical discipline, without however modifying it in its essential principles. Among the numerous collections of a later date, we may mention the Collectio Anselmo dedicata, compiled in Italy at the end of the 9th century, the Libellus de ecclesiasticis disciplinis of Regino of Prum (died 915); the Collectarium canonum of Burchard of Worms (died 1025); the collection of the younger Anselm of Lucca, compiled towards the end of the 11th century; the Collectio trium partium, the Decretum and the Panormia of Yves of Chartres (died 1115 or 1117); the Liber de misericordia et justitia of Algerus of Liège, who died in 1132; the Collection in 74 Titles – all collections which Gratian made use of in the compilation of his Decretum.

=== Jus Novum ===
The period of canonical history known as the Jus Novum ("new law") or middle period covers the time from Gratian to the Council of Trent (mid-12th century–16th century).

The various conciliar canons and papal decrees were gathered together into collections, both unofficial and official. In the year 1000, there was no book that had attempted to summarized the whole body of canon law, to systematize it in whole or in part. There were, however, many collections of the decrees of councils and great bishops. These collections usually only had regional force and were usually organized chronologically by type of document (e.g. letters of popes, canons of councils, etc.), or occasionally by general topic. Before the late 11th century, canon law was highly decentralized, depending on many different codifications and sources, whether of local councils, ecumenical councils, local bishops, or of the Bishops of Rome.

The first truly systematic collection was assembled by the Camaldolese monk Gratian in the 11th century, commonly known as the Decretum Gratiani ("Gratian's Decree") but originally called The Concordance of Discordant Canons (Concordantia Discordantium Canonum). Canon law greatly increased from 1140 to 1234. After that it slowed down, except for the laws of local councils (an area of canon law in need of scholarship), and was supplemented by secular laws. In 1234 Pope Gregory IX promulgated the first official collection of Canons, called the Decretalia Gregorii Noni or Liber Extra. This was followed by the Liber Sextus (1298) of Boniface VIII, the Clementines (1317) of Clement V, the Extravagantes Joannis XXII and the Extravagantes Communes, all of which followed the same structure as the Liber Extra. All these collections, with the Decretum Gratiani, are together referred to as the Corpus Juris Canonici. After the completion of the Corpus Juris Canonici, subsequent papal legislation was published in periodic volumes called Bullaria.

Johannes Gratian was a monk who taught theology at a monastery in Bologna. He produced a comprehensive and comprehensible collection of canon law. He resolved contradictions and discrepancies in the existing law. In the 1140s his work became the dominant legal text. The papacy appreciated and approved the Decretum of Gratian. The Decretum formed the core of the body of canon law upon which a greater legal structure was built. Before Gratian there was no "jurisprudence of canon law" (system of legal interpretation and principles). Gratian is the founder of canonical jurisprudence, which merits him the title "Father of Canon Law".

The combination of logical, moral, and political elements contributed to a systematization that was quite different from a merely doctrinal or dogmatic analysis of legal rules, however complex and however coherent. The canon law as a system was more than rules; it was a process, a dialectical process of adapting rules to new situations. This was inevitable if only because of the limits imposed upon its jurisdiction, and the consequent competition which it faced from the secular legal systems that coexisted with it.

In the thirteenth century, the Roman Church began to collect and organize its canon law, which after a millennium of development had become a complex and difficult system of interpretation and cross-referencing. The official collections were the Liber Extra (1234) of Pope Gregory IX, the Liber Sextus (1298) of Boniface VIII and the Clementines (1317), prepared for Clement V but published by John XXII. These were addressed to the universities by papal letters at the beginning of each collection, and these texts became textbooks for aspiring canon lawyers. In 1582 a compilation was made of the Decretum, Extra, the Sext, the Clementines and the Extravagantes (that is, the decretals of the popes from Pope John XXII to Pope Sixtus IV).

=== Jus Novissimum ===
After the Council of Trent, an attempt to secure a new official collection of church laws was made about 1580, when Gregory XIII charged three cardinals with the task. The work continued during the pontificate of Sixtus V, was accomplished under Clement VIII and was printed (Rome, 1598) as: Sanctissimi Domini nostri Clementis papæ VIII Decretales, sometimes also Septimus liber Decretalium. This collection, never approved either by Clement VIII or by Paul V, was edited (Freiburg, 1870) by Sentis. In 1557 the Italian canonist Paul Lancelottus attempted unsuccessfully to secure from Paul IV, for the four books of his Institutiones juris canonici (Rome, 1563), an authority equal to that which its model, the Institutiones of Emperor Justinian, once enjoyed in the Roman Empire. A private individual, Pierre Mathieu of Lyons, also wrote a Liber Septimus Decretalium, inserted in the appendix to the Frankfort (1590) edition of the Corpus Juris Canonici. This work was put on the Index.

=== Jus Codicis ===
==== Pio-Benedictine law ====
At the First Vatican Council several bishops asked for a new codification of the canon law, and after that several canonists attempted to compile treatises in the form of a full code of canonical legislation, e.g. de Luise (1873), Pillet (1890), Pezzani (1894), Deshayes (1894), Collomiati (1898–1901). Pius X determined to undertake this work by his decree "Arduum sane munus" (19 March 1904), and named a commission of cardinals to compile a new "Corpus Juris Canonici" on the model of the codes of civil law. The 1917 Codex Iuris Canonici (CIC, Code of Canon Law) was the first instance of a new code completely re-written in a systematic fashion, reduced to a single book or "codex" for ease of use. It took effect on 29 May 1918. It had 2,414 canons.

==== Johanno-Pauline law ====
In 1959, Pope John XXIII announced, together with his intention to call the Second Vatican Council and a Synod of the Diocese of Rome, that the 1917 Code would be completely revised. In 1963, the commission appointed to undertake the task decided to delay the project until the council had been concluded. After Vatican II closed in 1965, it became apparent that the Code would need to be revised in light of the documents and theology of Vatican II. After decades of discussion and numerous drafts, the project was nearly complete upon the death of Paul VI in 1978. The work was completed in the pontificate of Pope John Paul II. The revision, the 1983 Code of Canon Law, was promulgated by the apostolic constitution Sacrae Disciplinae Leges on 25 January 1983, taking effect on 27 November 1983. The subjects of the 1983 Codex Iuris Canonici (CIC, Code of Canon Law) are the world's 1.2 billion Catholics of what the Code itself calls the Latin Church. It has 7 books and 1,752 canons.

== Eastern canon law ==
Distinct from the canonical tradition of the Latin Church is the tradition of the Eastern Catholic Churches. The earliest Oriental canon law collections were called nomocanons, which were collections of both canon and civil law.

In the early twentieth century, when Eastern Churches began to come back to full communion with the Holy See, Pope Benedict XV created the Sacred Congregation for the Oriental Church in order to preserve the rights and traditions of the Eastern Catholic Churches.

Since the early twentieth century, Eastern Catholic canon law had been in the process of codification. Some of these Oriental canon law reforms were promulgated by Pope Pius XII. The codification effort culminated with the Pope John Paul II's 1990 promulgation of the Codex Canonum Ecclesiarum Orientalium (CCEO, Code of Canons of the Eastern Churches) which incorporates certain differences in the hierarchical, administrative, and judicial fora for the 23 sui juris particular Eastern Catholic Churches, which were each encouraged to issue codes of particular law peculiar to each church, so that all of the Catholic Church's canon law would be codified.

== Timeline ==
=== Jus antiquum ===
- From the apostolic period, the Catholic church used different collections of law but development of a single collection which could be used in all courts did not develop until the Middle Ages.
- 1059 – Nicolas II decrees that Cardinals have the right of electing the pope.

=== Jus novum ===
- The books of the Corpus Juris Canonici were derived from Gratian's work Decretum Gratiani and were integrated with papal decretals written from 1200 to 1500.
- 1210 – Innocent III promulgates the Compilatio tertia (compiled by Petrus Beneventanus)
- 1225 – Honorius III promulgates the Compilatio quinta (compiled by Tancredus of Bologna
- 1234 – Gregory IX promulgates the Decretals (compiled by St. Raymond of Peñafort)
- 1298 – Boniface VIII published a similar code on 3 March 1298, called the Liber Sextus (codified by a commission of legal scholars)
- 1317 – John XXII added to it the last official collection of Canon law, the Liber Septimus Decretalium, better known under the title of Constitutiones Clementis V, or simply Clementinæ, on 25 October 1317
- 1319 – John XXII promulgated his Extravagantes in August 1319

=== Jus novissimum ===
- 1566 – Pius V begins a project to unify the collection of law. He wanted to ensure the use of authentic and reliable versions of the libri legales so that the administration of justice did not depend on the version of Gratian that a particular canonical court used. He assembled a committee of great canon law scholars who became known as the Correctores Romani. The Correctores were guided by Antonio Agustín of Spain. Pope Pius V did not live to see this project to completion.
- 1582 – Gregory XIII orders republication of the entire Corpus Iuris Canonici as compiled at the time (enforced until 1917)

=== Jus codicis ===
- 1904 – Pius X appoints a commission to compile a code of canon law for the Latin Church
- 1917 – Benedict XV promulgates a complete code, the 1917 Code of Canon Law (Latin: Codex Iuris Canonici)
- 1918 – The 1917 Code comes into legal effect
- 1959, 25 January – John XXIII announces that the 1917 Code would be completely revised
- 1963, March 28 – The "Pontifical Commission for the Revision of the Code of Canon Law" is established
- 1963, November 12 – It is decided to postpone the work of revising the 1917 Code until the end of Vatican II
- 1965, November 20 – Paul VI inaugurates the work of the Pontifical Commission for the Revision of the Code of Canon Law
- 1983 – John Paul II promulgates the 1983 Code of Canon Law, abrogating the Code of 1917
- 1990 – John Paul II promulgates the Code of Canons of the Eastern Churches (Latin: Codex Canonum Ecclesiarum Orientalium)
- 1998 – John Paul II promulgates the motu proprio Ad Tuendam Fidem, amending certain canons of the 1983 CIC and the 1990 CCEO
- 2009 – Benedict XVI promulgates the motu proprio Omnium in Mentem, amending certain canons of the 1983 CIC and the 1990 CCEO
- 2015 – Pope Francis reforms the matrimonial processes dealing with declaring the nullity of marriage, promulgating the motu proprio Mitis Iudex Dominus Iesus amending the 1983 Code of Canon Law, and the motu proprio Mitis et misericors Iesus amending the Code of Canons of the Eastern Churches
- 2016, 15 September – Pope Francis issues the motu proprio De Concordia inter codices and amends some canons of the 1983 Code of Canon Law to bring them into harmony with the discipline of the Code of Canons of the Eastern Churches
- 2017, 3 September – Pope Francis issues the motu proprio Magnum principium, amending one canon (838) to grant episcopal conferences authority over liturgical translations
- 2019 – Pope Francis amends canon law to require leaders of a local religious order to dismiss members of their "religious house" who had been absent for 12 months and were out of contact
- 2019, 19 March – Pope Francis issues the motu proprio Communis vita, instituting ipso facto dismissal of religious who are absent for a full year illegitimately from their religious house and replacing canons 694 and 795 in their entirety, with a vacatio legis of 10 April 2019.

== See also ==
- Western Law
