= Religious law =

Ethical and moral codes taught by religious traditions

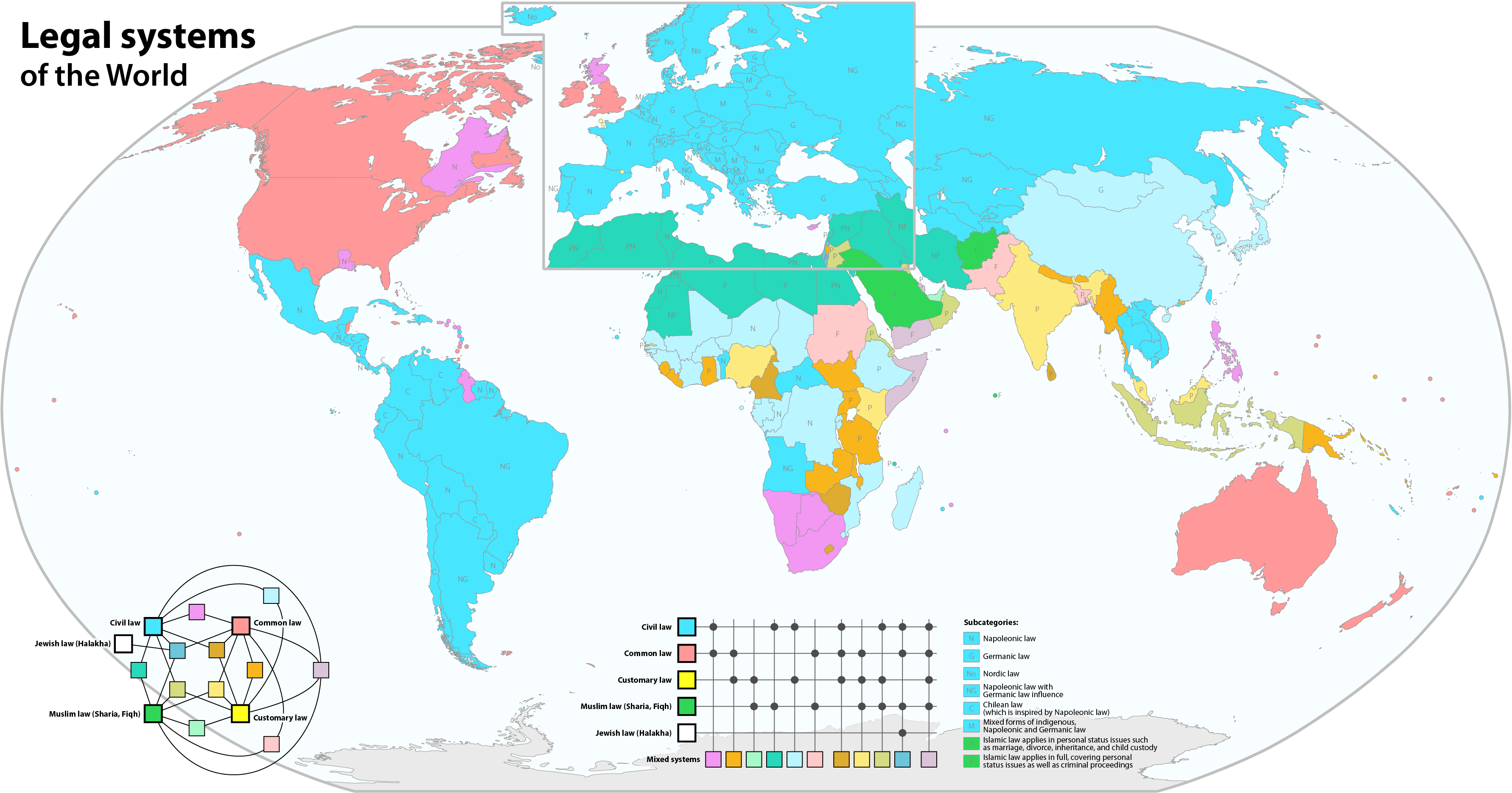
Legal systems by common law, civil law, Islamic law, Jewish law, or mixed

Religious law includes ethical and moral codes taught by religious traditions. Examples of religiously derived legal codes include Christian canon law (applicable within a wider theological conception in the church, but in modern times distinct from secular state law), Jewish halakha, Islamic sharia, and Hindu law. In some jurisdictions, religious law may apply only to that religion's adherents; in others, it may be enforced by civil authorities for all residents.

== Established religions and religious institutions ==
A state religion (or established church) is a religious body officially endorsed by the state. A theocracy is a form of government in which a God or a deity is recognized as the supreme civil ruler.

In both theocracies and some religious jurisdictions, conscientious objectors may cause religious offense. The contrary legal systems are secular states or multicultural societies in which the government does not formally adopt a particular religion, but may either repress all religious activity or enforce tolerance of religious diversity.

== Baháʼí Faith ==
Baháʼí laws are laws and ordinances used in the Baháʼí Faith and are a fundamental part of Baháʼí practice. The laws are based on authenticated texts from Bahá'u'lláh, the founder of the Baháʼí Faith, subsequent interpretations from `Abdu'l-Bahá and Shoghi Effendi and legislation by the Universal House of Justice. Baháʼí law is presented as a set of general principles and guidelines and individuals must apply them as they best seem fit. While some social laws are enforced by Baháʼí institutions, emphasis is placed on individuals following the laws based on their conscience, understanding, and reasoning. Baháʼís are expected to observe these laws out of love for Bahá'u'lláh. The laws are seen as the method of the maintenance of order and security in the world.

A few examples of laws and basic religious observances of the Kitáb-i-Aqdas which are considered obligatory for Baháʼís include:

- Recite an obligatory prayer each day. There are three such prayers among which one can be chosen each day.
- Observe a Nineteen Day Fast from sunrise to sunset from March 2 through March 20. During this time Baháʼís in good health between the ages of 15 and 70 abstain from eating and drinking.
- Gossip and backbiting are prohibited and viewed as particularly damaging to the individual and their relationships.

== Buddhism ==
In Buddhism, Patimokkha is a code of 227 rules and principles followed by Buddhist monks and nuns.

== Christianity ==
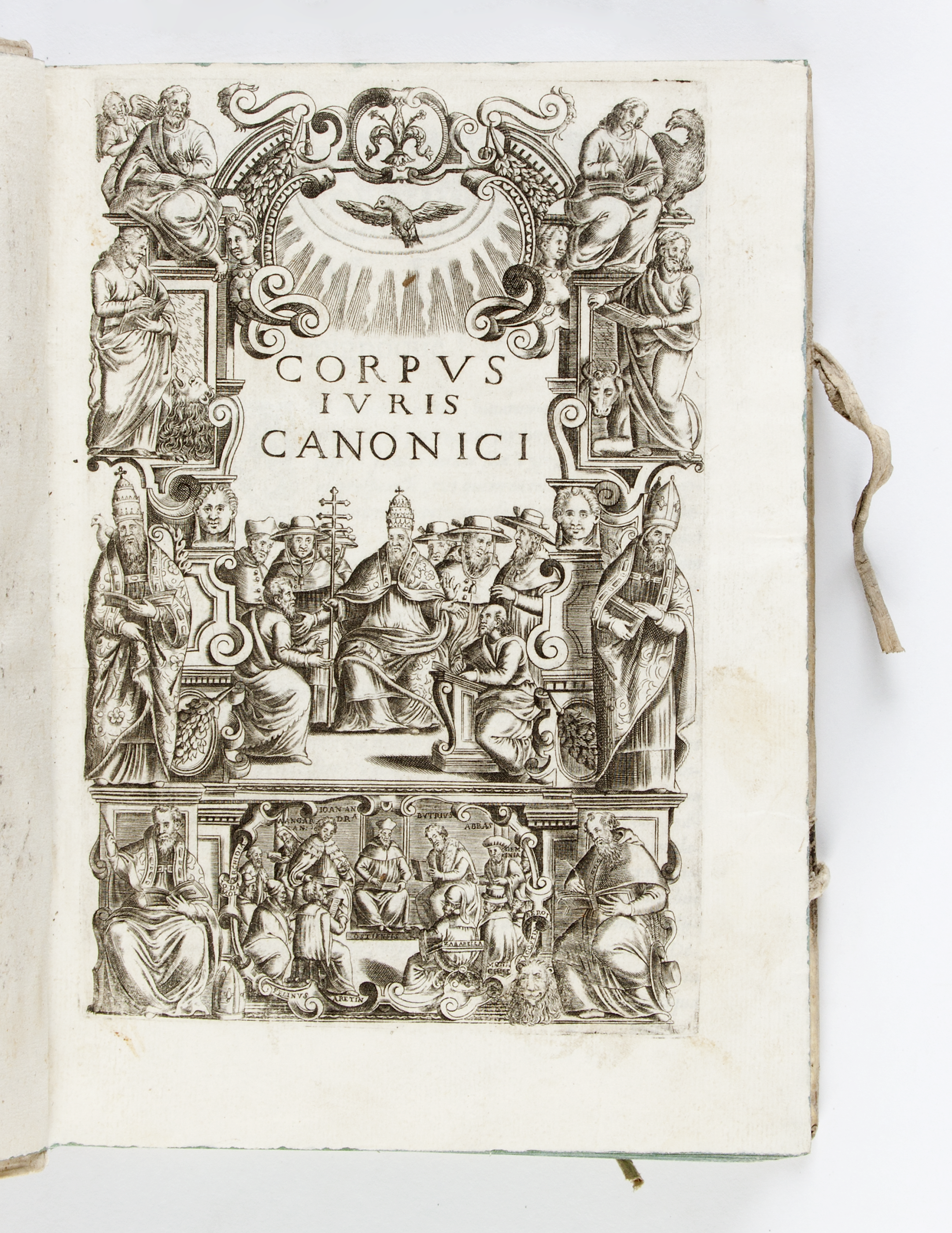
The Corpus Juris Canonici, the fundamental collection of Catholic canon law for over 750 years

Within the framework of Christianity, there are several possible definitions for religious law. One is the Mosaic Law (from what Christians consider to be the Old Testament), also called divine law or biblical law; the most famous example is the Ten Commandments. Another is the instructions of Jesus of Nazareth to his disciples in the Gospel (often referred to as the Law of Christ or the New Commandment or the New Covenant, in contrast to the Old Covenant). Another is the Apostolic Decree of Acts 15, which is still observed by the Greek Orthodox Church. Another is canon law in the Catholic, Anglican, and Orthodox churches.

In some Christian denominations, law is often contrasted with grace (see also Law and Gospel and Antithesis of the Law): the contrast here speaks to an attempt to gain salvation by obedience to a code of laws as opposed to seeking salvation through faith in the atonement made by Jesus on the cross. From the Gospel of John:

John 1:16-18

— And of his fullness have all we received, and grace for grace. For the law was given by Moses, but grace and truth came by Jesus Christ., KJV

=== Biblical/Mosaic law ===
Christian views of the Old Covenant vary and are to be distinguished from Christian theology, ethics, and practice. The term "Old Covenant", also referred to as the Mosaic covenant and the Law of Moses, refers to the statements or principles of religious law and religious ethics codified in the first five books or Pentateuch of the Old Testament. Views of the Old Covenant are expressed in the New Testament, such as Jesus' antitheses of the law, the circumcision controversy in Early Christianity, and the Incident at Antioch and position of Paul the Apostle and Judaism. Most Christians hold that only parts are applicable, while some Protestants have the view that none is applicable. Dual-covenant theologians have the view that only Noahide Laws apply to Gentiles. The Jewish Christianity movement is virtually extinct. According to the New Testament Christians are no longer regarded as Gentiles (Romans 8: 28–29)

=== Canon law ===
Canon law is the body of laws and regulations made by or adopted by ecclesiastical authority for the governance of the Christian organization and its members. It is the internal ecclesiastical law governing the Roman Catholic Church, the Eastern and Oriental Orthodox Churches, and the Anglican Communion of churches. The way that such church law is legislated, interpreted and at times adjudicated varies widely among these three bodies of churches. In all three traditions, a canon was initially a rule adopted by a church council (From Greek kanon / κανών, Hebrew kaneh / קנה, for rule, standard, or measure); these canons formed the foundation of canon law.

==== Canons of the Apostles ====
The Canons of the Apostles or Ecclesiastical Canons of the Same Holy Apostles is a collection of ancient ecclesiastical decrees (eighty-five in the Eastern, fifty in the Western Church) concerning the government and discipline of the Early Christian Church, incorporated with the Apostolic Constitutions which are part of the Ante-Nicene Fathers

==== Catholic Church ====
The canon law of the Catholic Church (Latin: jus canonicum) is the system of laws and legal principles made and enforced by the hierarchical authorities of the Church to regulate its external organization and government and to order and direct the activities of Catholics toward the mission of the Church. It was the first modern Western legal system and is the oldest continuously functioning legal system in the West, predating the European common law and civil law traditions. What began with rules ("canons") adopted by the Apostles at the Council of Jerusalem in the 1st century has blossomed into a highly complex and original legal system encapsulating not just norms of the New Testament, but some elements of the Hebrew (Old Testament), Roman, Visigothic, Saxon, and Celtic legal traditions spanning thousands of years of human experience. while the unique traditions of Eastern Catholic canon law govern the 23 Eastern Catholic particular churches sui iuris.

Positive ecclesiastical laws derive formal authority in the case of universal laws from promulgation by the supreme legislator—the Supreme Pontiff—who possesses the totality of legislative, executive, and judicial power in his person, while particular laws derive formal authority from promulgation by a legislator inferior to the supreme legislator, whether an ordinary or a delegated legislator. The actual subject material of the canons is not just doctrinal or moral in nature, but all-encompassing of the human condition.

It has all the ordinary elements of a mature legal system: laws, courts, lawyers, judges, a fully articulated legal code for the Latin Church as well as a code for the Eastern Catholic Churches, principles of legal interpretation, and coercive penalties. It lacks civilly binding force in most secular jurisdictions. Those who are versed and skilled in canon law, and professors of canon law, are called canonists (or colloquially, canon lawyers). Canon law as a sacred science is called canonistics.

The jurisprudence of Catholic canon law is the complex of legal principles and traditions within which canon law operates, while the philosophy, theology, and fundamental theory of Catholic canon law are the areas of philosophical, theological, and legal scholarship dedicated to providing a theoretical basis for canon law as a legal system and as true law.

In the early Church, the first canons were decreed by bishops united in "Ecumenical" councils (the Emperor summoning all of the known world's bishops to attend with at least the acknowledgement of the Bishop of Rome) or "local" councils (bishops of a region or territory). Over time, these canons were supplemented with decretals of the Bishops of Rome, which were responses to doubts or problems according to the maxim, Roma locuta est, causa finita est ("Rome has spoken, case is closed").

Later, they were gathered together into collections, both unofficial and official. The first truly systematic collection was assembled by the Camaldolese monk Gratian in the 11th century, commonly known as the Decretum Gratiani ("Gratian's Decree"). Pope Gregory IX is credited with promulgating the first official collection of canons called the Decretalia Gregorii Noni or Liber Extra (1234). This was followed by the Liber Sextus (1298) of Boniface VIII, the Clementines (1317) of Clement V, the Extravagantes Joannis XXII and the Extravagantes Communes, all of which followed the same structure as the Liber Extra. All these collections, with the Decretum Gratiani, are together referred to as the Corpus Juris Canonici. After the completion of the Corpus Juris Canonici, subsequent papal legislation was published in periodic volumes called Bullaria.

By the 19th century, this body of legislation included some 10,000 norms, many difficult to reconcile with one another due to changes in circumstances and practice. This situation impelled Pope Pius X to order the creation of the first Code of Canon Law, a single volume of clearly stated laws. Under the aegis of Cardinal Pietro Gasparri, the Commission for the Codification of Canon Law was completed under Benedict XV, who promulgated the Code, effective in 1918. The work having been begun by Pius X, it was sometimes called the "Pio-Benedictine Code" but more often the 1917 Code. In its preparation, centuries of material was examined, scrutinized for authenticity by leading experts, and harmonized as much as possible with opposing canons and even other Codes, from the Codex of Justinian to the Napoleonic Code.

Pope John XXIII initially called for a Synod of the Diocese of Rome, an Ecumenical Council, and an updating to the 1917 Code. After the Second Ecumenical Council of the Vatican (Vatican II) closed in 1965, it became apparent that the Code would need to be revised in light of the documents and theology of Vatican II. After multiple drafts and many years of discussion, Pope John Paul II promulgated the revised Code of Canon Law (CIC) in 1983. Containing 1752 canons, it is the law currently binding on the Latin (Western) Roman Church.

The canon law of the Eastern Catholic Churches, which had developed some different disciplines and practices, underwent its own process of codification, resulting in the Code of Canons of the Eastern Churches promulgated in 1990 by Pope John Paul II.

The institutions and practices of canon law paralleled the legal development of much of Europe, and consequently both modern civil law and common law bear the influences of canon law. Edson Luiz Sampel, a Brazilian expert in canon law, says that canon law is contained in the genesis of various institutes of civil law, such as the law in continental Europe and Latin American countries. Sampel explains that canon law has significant influence in contemporary society.

Currently, all Latin Catholic seminary students are expected to take a course in canon law (c. 252.3). Some ecclesiastical officials are required to have the doctorate (JCD) or at least the licentiate (JCL) in canon law in order to fulfill their functions: Judicial Vicars (c. 1419.1), Judges (c. 1421.3), Promoters of Justice (c. 1435), Defenders of the Bond (c. 1435). In addition, Vicars General and Episcopal Vicars are to be doctors or at least licensed in canon law or theology (c. 478.1), and canonical advocates must either have the doctorate or be truly expert in canon law (c. 1483). Ordinarily, bishops are to have advanced degrees in sacred scripture, theology, or canon law (c. 378.1.5). St. Raymond of Penyafort (1175–1275), a Spanish Dominican priest, is the patron saint of canonists, due to his important contributions to the science of canon law.

==== Orthodox Churches ====
The Greek-speaking Orthodox have collected canons and commentaries upon them in a work known as the Pēdálion (Greek: Πηδάλιον, "Rudder"), so named because it is meant to "steer" the Church. The Orthodox Christian tradition in general treats its canons more as guidelines than as laws, the bishops adjusting them to cultural and other local circumstances. Some Orthodox canon scholars point out that, had the Ecumenical Councils (which deliberated in Greek) meant for the canons to be used as laws, they would have called them nómoi/νόμοι (laws) rather than kanónes/κανόνες (rules), but almost all Orthodox conform to them. The dogmatic decisions of the Councils, though, are to be obeyed rather than to be treated as guidelines, since they are essential for the Church's unity.

==== Anglican Communion ====
In the Church of England, the ecclesiastical courts that formerly decided many matters such as disputes relating to marriage, divorce, wills, and defamation, still have jurisdiction of certain church-related matters (e.g., discipline of clergy, alteration of church property, and issues related to churchyards). Their separate status dates back to the 11th century when the Normans split them off from the mixed secular/religious county and local courts used by the Saxons. In contrast to the other courts of England, the law used in ecclesiastical matters is at least partially a civil law system, not common law, although heavily governed by parliamentary statutes. Since the Reformation, ecclesiastical courts in England have been royal courts. The teaching of canon law at the universities of Oxford and Cambridge was abrogated by Henry VIII; thereafter practitioners in the ecclesiastical courts were trained in civil law, receiving a Doctor of Civil Law (D.C.L.) degree from Oxford, or an LL.D. from Cambridge. Such lawyers (called "doctors" and "civilians") were centred at "Doctors Commons", a few streets south of St Paul's Cathedral in London, where they monopolized probate, matrimonial, and admiralty cases until their jurisdiction was removed to the common law courts in the mid-19th century. (Admiralty law was also based on civil law instead of common law, thus was handled by the civilians too.)

Charles I repealed Canon Law in Scotland in 1638 after uprisings of Covenanters confronting the Bishops of Aberdeen following the convention at Muchalls Castle and other revolts across Scotland earlier that year.

Other churches in the Anglican Communion around the world (e.g., the Episcopal Church in the United States and the Anglican Church of Canada) still function under their own private systems of canon law.

==== Presbyterian and Reformed Churches ====
In Presbyterian and Reformed Churches, canon law is known as "practice and procedure" or "church order", and includes the church's laws respecting its government, discipline, legal practice and worship.

==== Lutheranism ====
The Book of Concord is the historic doctrinal statement of the Lutheran Church, consisting of ten credal documents recognized as authoritative in Lutheranism since the 16th century. However, the Book of Concord is a confessional document (stating orthodox belief) rather than a book of ecclesiastical rules or discipline, like canon law. Each Lutheran national church establishes its own system of church order and discipline, though these are not referred to as "canons".

==== The United Methodist Church ====
The Book of Discipline contains the laws, rules, policies and guidelines for The United Methodist Church. It is revised every four years by the General Conference, the law-making body of The United Methodist Church; the last edition was published in 2016.

== Hinduism ==
Hindu law, a term of colonial origin, is derived from Hindu texts such as the Vedas, Upanishads, Dharmashastras, Puranas, Itihasas, Dharmasutras, Grihya Sutras, Arthashastra and Niti Shastras.

== Islam ==
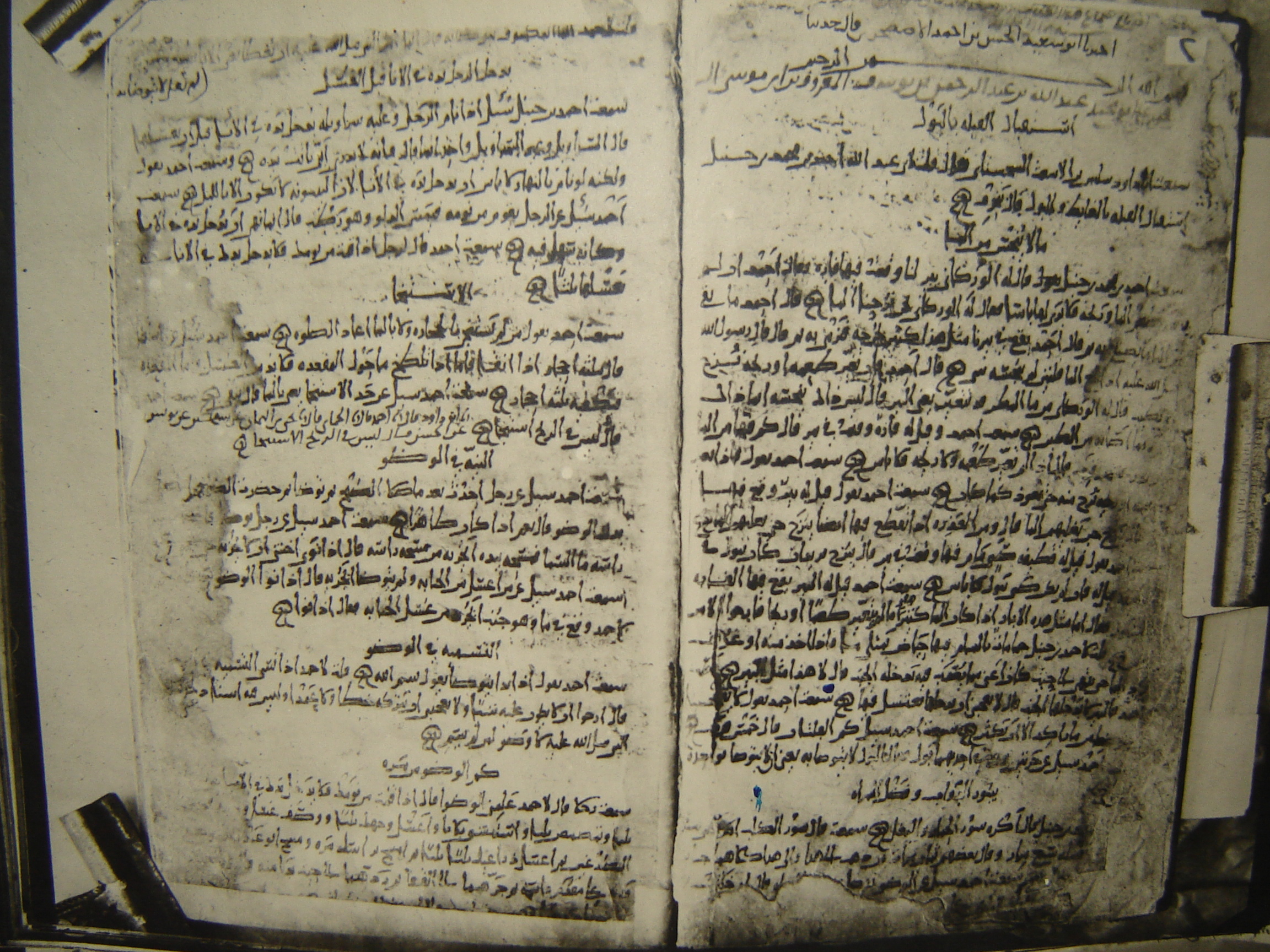
A manuscript of Ibn Hanbal's legal writings, produced October 879

Sharia laws by country for civil and criminal cases regional variations only for Muslims

Sharia, also known as Islamic law (قانون إسلامي qānūn ʾIslāmī), is the moral code and religious law of Islam. Sharia is derived from two primary sources, the precepts set forth in the Quran and the example set by the Islamic prophet Muhammad in the sunnah. Islamic jurisprudence (fiqh) interprets and extends the application of sharia to questions not directly addressed in the primary sources (the Quran and the sunnah) by including secondary sources. These secondary sources usually include the consensus of the sahabah (companions of the prophet) and ulama (religious scholars) embodied in ijma, as well as analogy from the Quran and sunnah through qiyas. In the Maliki school of law also, 'amal ahlil madinah (the practices of the people of Medina) is also included.

Muslims believe the sharia is Allah's law, but they differ as to what exactly it entails. Modernists, traditionalists and fundamentalists all hold different views of sharia, as do adherents to different schools of Islamic thought and scholarship. Different countries, societies and cultures have varying interpretations of sharia as well.

Sharia deals with many topics addressed by secular law, including crime, politics and economics, as well as personal matters such as sexual intercourse, hygiene, diet, prayer, inheritance and fasting. Where it has official status, sharia is applied by Islamic judges, or qadis. The imam has varying responsibilities depending on the interpretation of sharia; while the term is commonly used to refer to the leader of communal prayers, the imam may also be a scholar, religious leader, or political leader.

The reintroduction of sharia is a longstanding goal for Islamist movements in Muslim countries. Some Muslim minorities in Asia (e.g., in India) have maintained institutional recognition of sharia to adjudicate their personal and community affairs. In Western countries, where Muslim immigration is more recent, Muslim minorities have introduced sharia family law for use in their own disputes with varying degrees of success, e.g., Britain's Muslim Arbitration Tribunal. Attempts by Muslims to impose sharia on non-Muslims in countries with large Muslim populations have been accompanied by controversy, violence, and even warfare (cf. Second Sudanese Civil War).

== Jainism ==
Jain law or Jaina law refers to the modern interpretation of ancient Jain Law that consists of rules for adoption, marriage, succession and death for the followers of Jainism.

== Judaism ==
Halakha (Hebrew: הלכה; literally "walking") is the collective body of rabbinic Jewish religious laws derived from the Written and Oral Torah, including the Mishnah, the halakhic Midrash, the Talmud, and its commentaries. After the destruction of the Second Temple by the Romans in the year 70 during the First Jewish–Roman War, the Oral Law was developed through intensive and expansive interpretations of the written Torah.

The halakhah has developed gradually through a variety of legal and quasi-legal mechanisms, including judicial decisions, legislative enactments, and customary law. The literature of questions to rabbis, and their considered answers, are referred to as Responsa. Over time, as practices develop, codes of Jewish law were written based on Talmudic literature and Responsa. The most influential code, the Shulchan Aruch, guides the religious practice of most Orthodox and some Conservative Jews.

According to rabbinic tradition there are 613 mitzvot in the written Torah. The mitzvot in the Torah (also called the Law of Moses) pertain to nearly every aspect of human life. Some of these laws are directed only to men or to women, some only to the ancient priestly groups (the Kohanim and Leviyim) members of the tribe of Levi, some only to farmers within the Land of Israel. Some laws are only applicable when there is a Temple in Jerusalem (see Third Temple).

== See also ==
- Doctrine and Covenants – Part of the scriptural canons of Latter Day Saint denominations
- Ethics in religion
- Judicial interpretation – Ways courts interpret laws, especially Constitutional laws
- Law and religion – Interdisciplinary study
- Lawsuits against God
- List of national legal systems – System for interpreting and enforcing the laws
- Morality and religion – Relationship between religious views and morals
- Islamic religious police – Religious enforcement agency
- Rule according to higher law – Belief that universal principles of morality override unjust laws
- Rule of law – Political situation in which everyone is subject to the law
