= Quinque compilationes antiquae =

12th- and 13th-century decretal collections

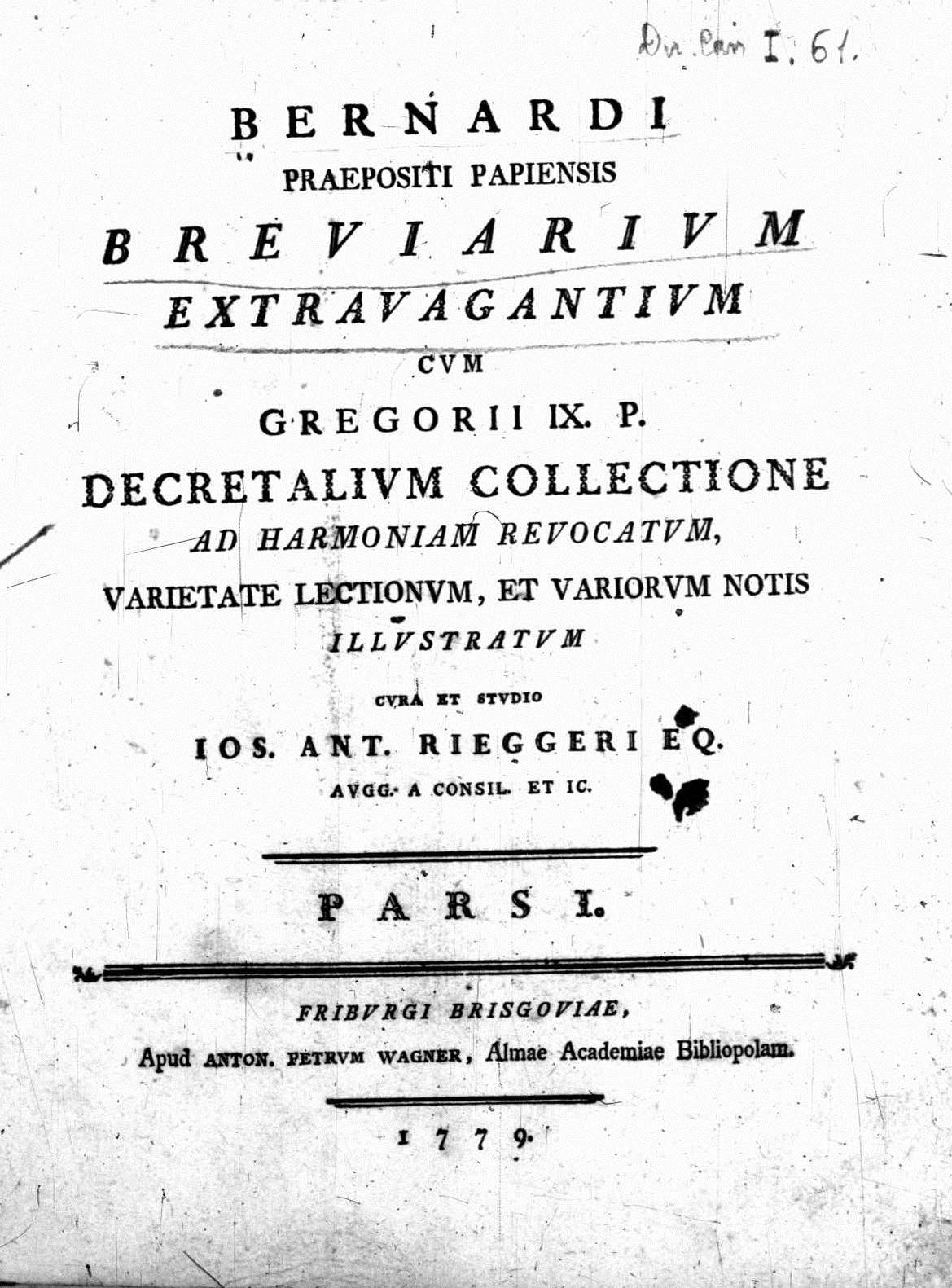
Breviarium extravagantium ("Compendium of Decretals Circulating Outside"), the first of the five collections, was compiled by Bernardus Papiensis.

The Quinque compilationes antiquae (Note: Translated into English as Five Ancient Compilations.) is a set of five collections of twelfth and thirteenth century decretals (specifically extravagantes) totalling between 1,971 and 2,139 chapters.

== Content ==
=== Compilatio prima ===
The first collection, the Compilatio prima, was originally titled Breviarium extravagantium (Note: Or Compendium of Decretals Circulating Outside.) (due to the fact that its decretals were not found in the Decretum Gratiani) and compiled by Bernardus Papiensis between 1189 and 1191, making it the first non-anonymous collection of decretals. Much of Bernardus' work collects decretals by Pope Alexander III, in addition to three decretals by Pope Gregory VIII and another three by Pope Clement III.

Bernardus was the earliest known person to have published a systematically organised compilation of decretals on the jus novum, although the Breviarium extravagantium was not his first attempt; around ten years prior, he had collected some ninety-five decretals in a manuscript titled Collectio Parisiensis secunda.

The Compilatio prima introduced the five-book scheme (categorised according to the general subjects of "judge", "trial", "clergy", "marriage", and "crime") that was adopted by the other four collections in the Quinque compilationes and almost all other later decretal collections to boot. Like the other collections in the Quinque compilationes, the Compilatio prima also contains a preface and is assigned chapters with various canons.

=== Compilatio secunda ===
The second collection, the Compilatio secunda, was compiled by John Galensis and contains decretals by Pope Clement III, Pope Celestine III, Pope Alexander II, and Pope Lucius II. Despite the fact that it was compiled shortly after the third collection, between 1210 and 1212, the Compilatio secunda was so named because most of its decretals predate those found in the Compilatio tertia but postdate the ones in the Compilatio prima.

=== Compilatio tertia ===
The third collection, Compilatio tertia, was compiled between late 1209 and early 1210 by a notary known as Petrus Beneventanus or Pietro Collivacino. It contains only decretals by Pope Innocent III, who expressed his approval of it and vouched for the authenticity of its contents, even though not all of them can be found in the papal registers.

=== Compilatio quarto ===
The fourth collection, Compilatio quarto, was compiled by Johannes Teutonicus and contains canons passed by the Fourth Lateran Council alongside other decretals by Innocent III and 44 of his earlier letters. The Compilatio quarto was presented to Innocent in 1215 but the pope refused to endorse it for unknown reasons. Although initially disregarded by canonists, it was eventually published by Johannes sometime after Innocent's death.

=== Compilatio quinta ===
In 1217, the recently elected Pope Honorius III commissioned what would become the final collection in the Quinque compilationes; it was the first time that a pope had explicitly called for a decretal collection to be produced. The Compilatio quinta was compiled by the archbishop of Bologna, Tancred, and published around 2 May 1226, near the end of Honorius' pontificate. Unlike the first four compilations, the Compilatio quinta contains secular legislation, specifically portions of Hac edictali lege, a statute written by Emperor Frederick II.

== Influence ==
Frequently cited by contemporary canonists, the Quinque compilationes antiquae served as the "standard textbook" for the study of decretal law in the early thirteenth century. Some 1,756 chapters' worth of content in the five collections were subsequently incorporated into the Liber extra decretalium by Raymond of Penyafort, which was commissioned by Pope Gregory IX in 1230 and completed in 1234.
