= Code of Canon Law =

Code of Canon Law (Latin: Codex Iuris Canonici) may refer to:

- Corpus Juris Canonici ('Body of Canon Law'), a collection of sources of canon law of the Catholic Church applicable to the Latin Church until 1918
- 1917 Code of Canon Law, code of canon law for the Catholic Latin Church from 1918 to 1983
- 1983 Code of Canon Law, code of canon law for the Catholic Latin Church from 1983 to today
- Code of Canons of the Eastern Churches, code of canon law for the Catholic Eastern Church from 1991 to today
- The Pedalion, an Eastern Orthodox treatise on canon law by Nicodemus the Hagiorite

== See also ==
- Canon (canon law)
- Canon law
- Canon law of the Catholic Church
- Eastern Catholic canon law
- Eastern canonical reforms of Pius XII
- Collections of ancient canons
- Canon law of the Eastern Orthodox Church
- Nomocanon
- Kormchaia
