= Spondent quas non exhibent =

Papal decretal promulgated in 1317 by John XXII

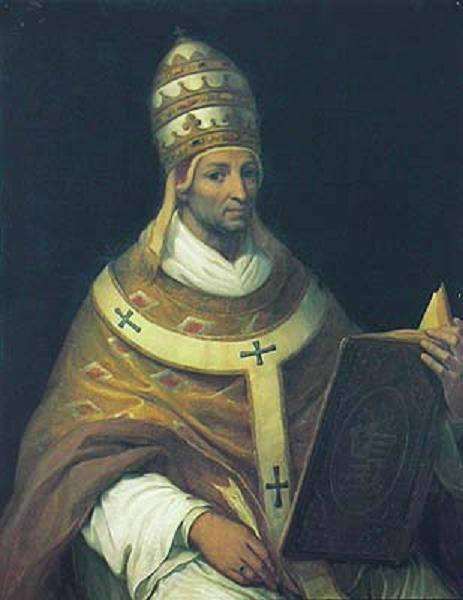
The issuer of the decretal, Pope John XXII

Spondent quas non exhibent (sometimes referred to as Spondent pariter) is a papal decretal promulgated in 1317 by Pope John XXII forbidding the practice of alchemy. The rationale provided for the ban in the decretal is not a specifically theological one, but instead a moral condemnation, with the Pope expounding how fraudulent alchemists exploited the poor and charging them with knowingly engaging in falsehood.

== Description ==
Calling it "The Crime of Falsification", the Pope specified that any person who either produced, successfully ordered the production of, assisted in the production of or knowingly sold false alchemic metals in attempt to pay off debt should be sentenced to pay a fine; the fine was to be calculated by weighing the alchemic metal and then charging however much that weight of real silver or gold would cost. Provisions were also made for those who could not afford to pay, the decree stated that other forms of punishment were allowed to be used, such as imprisonment, but that the precise sentence depended on the surrounding factors of the case. Those who went on to use alchemic metals for the forging of coins were also condemned (one possible motivating factor for this inclusion being that the papacy was located in the French commune of Avignon, which had a lot of counterfeit currency in circulation), but the harshest punishment was reserved for clerics, who if found guilty, were to be subjected to the loss of all their clerical benefices and denied the chance to regain them in the future, in addition to the normal punishment detailed above. As a result of the decree, alchemists were forced to conduct their practice in secret.

The decretal is frequently misunderstood to have been an anti-science (specifically an anti-chemistry) edict, but this is false – it was specifically against fraudulent alchemy. Pope John XXII had himself studied chemistry before entering the clergy, and his papacy was marked by events that led one historian to remark that he was "one of the most liberal patrons of education and of science in history."

Spondent Pariter is sometimes referred to as a papal bull, though canonically it is not a bull but a less important document termed a decretal, specifically an Extravagantes. It is listed in Corpus Juris Canonici Tome II (published in Lyon, 1799), but not in the ordinary list of Pope John XXII's bulls.
