= Dominum Deum Nostrum Papam =

Dominum Deum Nostrum Papam (Latin: Our Lord God the Pope) is a phrase first used in the gloss to the 14th century Extravagantes (Vat.lat.1397) of Pope John XXII which was written by Zenzelinus de Cassanis of Toulouse who was a Canonist and papal chaplain who died in 1334 in Avignon. His influential works strengthened the legal foundations of the papacy against conciliar tendencies. He rose to the position of papal chaplain and "Auditor Sacri Palatii". The phrase became hotly debated in some protestant catholic polemics.

== Gloss Contextual Definition ==
To gloss is to interpret or explain a text by taking up its words one after another. A glossary is therefore a collection of words about which observations and notes have been gathered, and a glossarist is one who thus explains or illustrates given texts. In Canon law, glosses are short elucidations attached to the important words in the juridical texts which make up the collections of the "Corpus Juris Canonici".

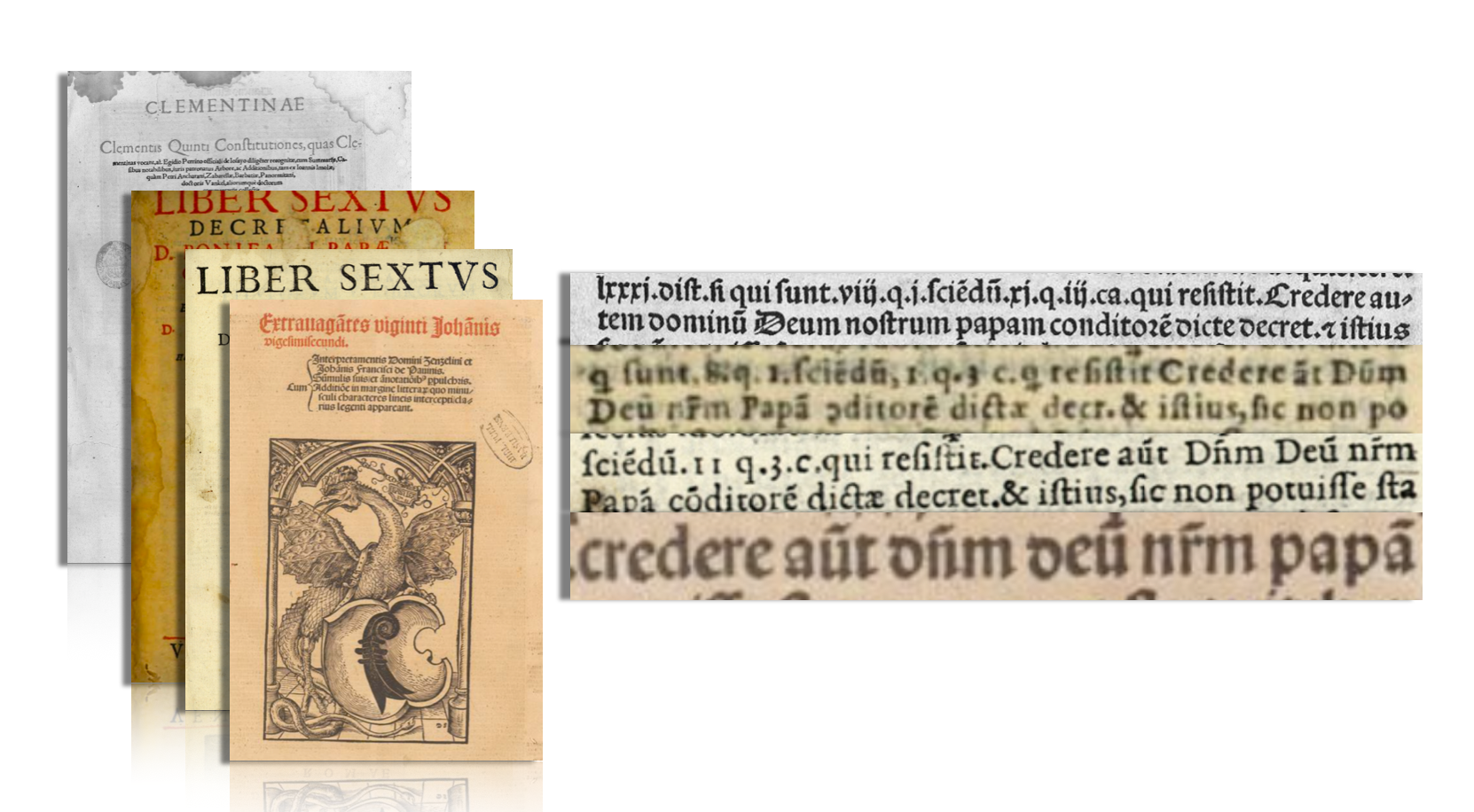
Multiple Copies of Liber Sextus Decretalium, 1584, 1600, 1511, 1543 Containing Gloss

== Origins of the Phrase ==
Over the years considerable discussion has taken place between Protestants and Catholics over the legitimacy and credibility of the phrase with some claiming that it was not included in the original (Vat.lat.1397) housed in the vatican library. One Catholic blog cited that

"an examination of the original manuscript [Vat.lat.1397] of Zenzelinus, preserved in the Vatican Library, failed to reveal the words attributed to him; and it has been definitely proved that the reference to God is an interpolation in later copies of his commentary."

Other Catholic writers have claimed the gloss was a copyist error that appeared centuries later from the original Protestants have long protested such statements by teaching they are a fulfillment of the warning about the man of sin or Antichrist in 2 Thessalonians 2:4.

=== Vatican Library Investigation ===
One catholic blog reportedly emailed the Vatican Digital Library which reportedly responded stating in part:

"In Zenzelinus de Cassanis' original manuscripts (reference: Vaticanus latinus 2583, f. 258 v, and Vaticanus latinus 1404, f. 22 r, both from the 14th century) the word 'Deum' does NOT occur in the passage that anti-Catholics so often love to cite."

The same blogs claimed that the "original" defined by the same as Vat.lat.1397 did not contain the gloss.

=== 14th Century Original Manuscript Verification ===
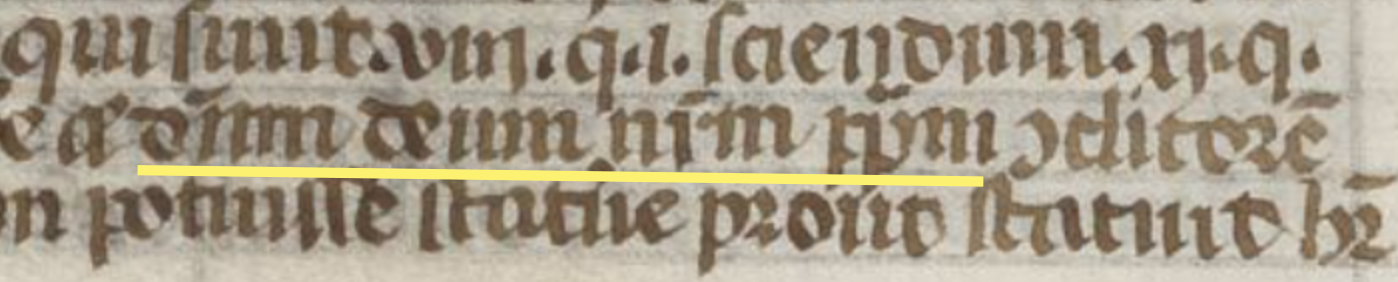
Original Vat.Lat.1397 Folio 166v "Dominum Deum Nostrum Papam"

Despite the claims of some Catholic blogs claiming the original 14th century manuscript did not contain the full "Dominum Deum Nostrum Papam", the gloss can be found in the original at Vat.Lat.1397 Folio 166v left column, 6th line down from the top.

== Subsequent Usage ==
The gloss continued to be incorporated in multiple editions of extravagantes for hundreds of years. In 1578, Pope Gregory XIII formally appointed a small commission of learned cardinals and other clerics, generally referred to as the Correctores Romani, to set about the task of editing the Decretum. From the early 1570s at least, scholars working under papal auspices had been preparing the way. They had gone through the Vatican's manuscripts, then sent letters out across Catholic Europe, asking for the loan of, or copies of, manuscripts of Gratian and earlier canonical collections, seeking to collect the best examples local churches could provide. Responses came from curia cardinals, from remote Spanish monasteries, from beleaguered prelates in the Low Countries. The Correctores worked their way through the texts of the Decretum, collating the manuscripts, comparing and discussing variant readings they encountered, and keeping copious notes as they chose the readings they thought most accurate for the new edition. That Roman edition, published in 1582 and again in 1584 with Gregory XIII's letter of authorization as its preface, became the standard text within the Catholic world.

Year of Publication/Location	1511	1543	1556	1582	1584	1585	1600	1601	1605	1606	1612
	**Basel**	**Lyon**	Lyon	**Rome**	**Rome**	Paris	**Venice**	Paris	**Venice**	Lyon	Paris
Bolded Locations contained Gloss					**Lyon x2**						
					Antwerp						

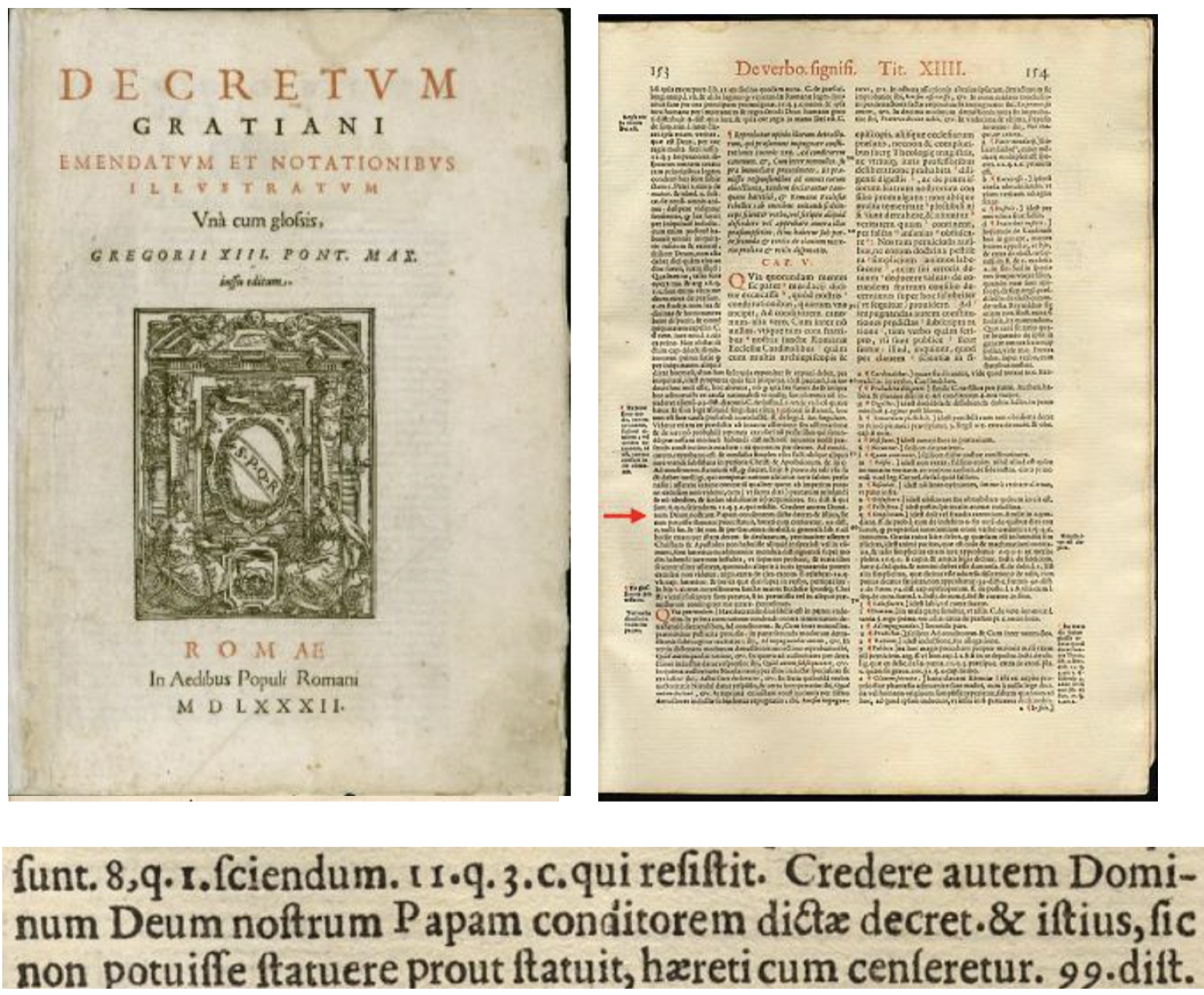
1582 Corrected Editio Roma Version of Extravagantes Containing still "Dominum Deum Nostrum Papam"

Over the years many editions contained the full gloss with the substantive "Deum"

== Consistency with Catholic Doctrine ==
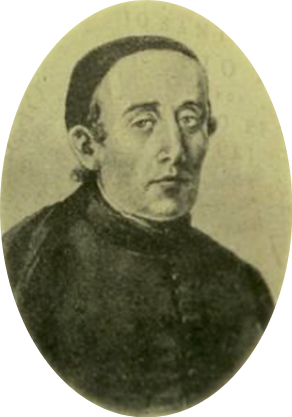
Priest Antonio Pereira

Catholic Historian, Priest Antonio Pereira de Figueiredo in 1768 stated

"That the Gloss of the aforementioned Extravagant gave the Pope the title of God is an undeniable and constant fact based on the lesson of the same Gloss of the editions that I pointed out in the Theological Attempt That the Popes did not disapprove or reject this title is another equally undeniable and constant fact based on the edition of Canon Law ordered to be made and published in Rome in the year 1580 by Gregory XIII"

Additionally while the gloss existed as a commentary on the body of canon law and thereby not holding the same authority, some protestants have noted that Distinctio 96, Chapter "Satis Evidenter" of the Decretum Gratiani already stated that the pope was shown by the pious prince Constantine to be God with the following statement:

"Satis evidenter ostenditur a saeculari potestate nec solvi prosus nec ligari pontificem, quem constat a pio principe Constantio Deum appellatum, cum nec posse Deum ab hominibus judicari manifestum est" "It is quite clearly shown that the pontiff cannot be bound by the secular power, which is evidently called God by the pious prince Constantine, since it is evident that even God cannot be judged by men"

Thus the gloss was recognized by some to be consistent with the body of canon law in the Decretum Gratiani including multiple editions at the Biblioteca Apostolica Vaticana.

== Catholic Denials ==
Various Blogs and websites have responded either denying the existence of the phrase in the original (Vat.lat.1397) manuscript or attempting to downplay the authority of the canonists interpretation of canon law.
