= Anastasius Germonius =

17th-century Roman Catholic bishop and canon lawyer

Most Reverend Anastasio Germonio
- Archbishop of Tarentaise
- Church: Catholic Church
- Diocese: Diocese of Tarentaise
- In office: 1607–1627
- Predecessor: Jean-François Berliet
- Successor: Benoît-Théophile de Chevron Villette

Orders
- Consecration: 30 Dec 1607 by Domenico Pinelli (seniore)

Personal details
- Born: 27 Feb 1551 Mondovì, Italy
- Died: 4 Aug 1627 (age 76) Madrid, Spain

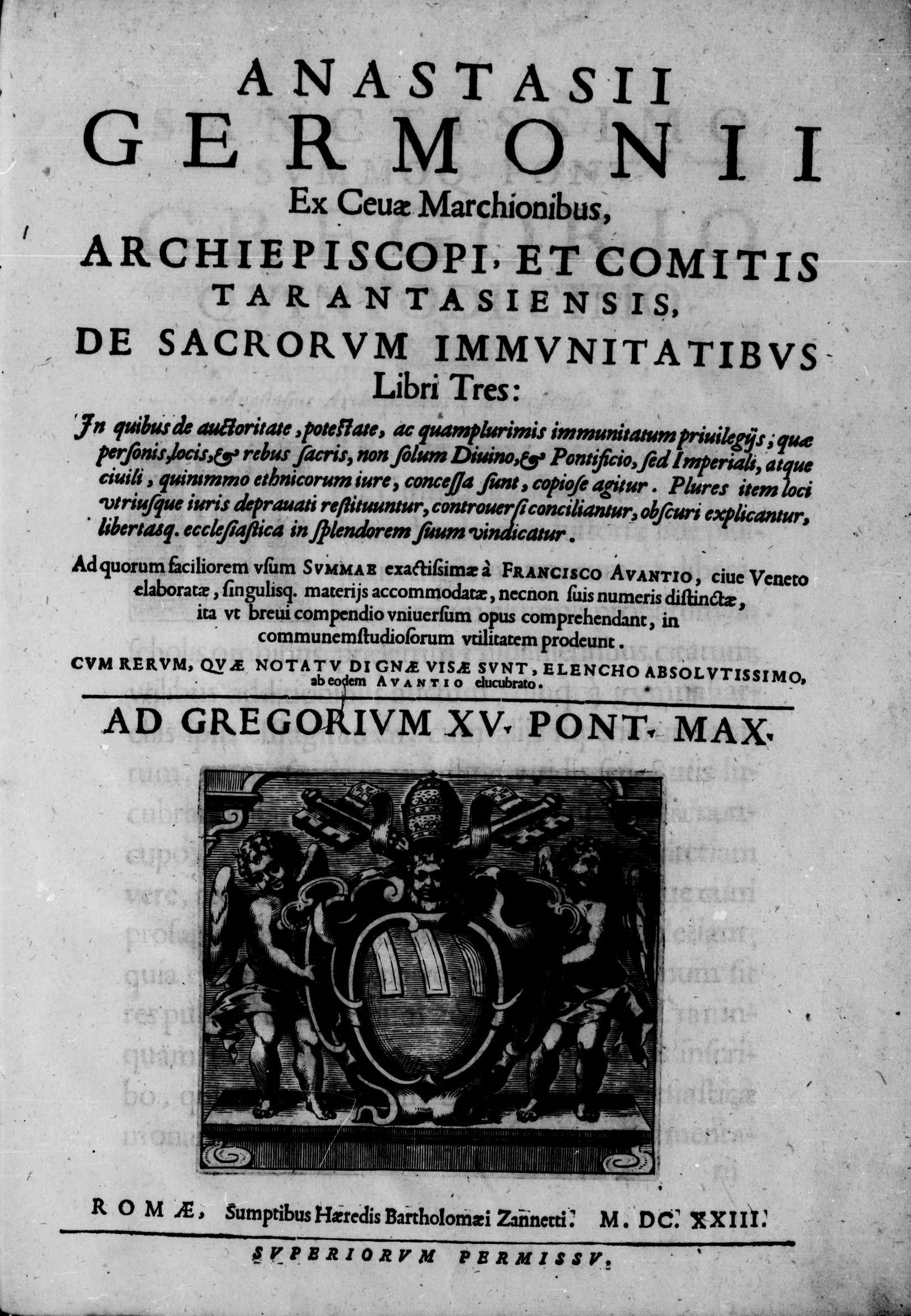
De sacrorum immunitatibus, 1623

Anastasius Germonius (Anastasio Germonio in Italian and Anastase Germon in French) (1551 – 4 August 1627) was an Italian Canon lawyer, diplomatist and archbishop of Tarantaise, who belonged to the family of the marquises of Ceve, in Piedmont, where he was born.

== Biography ==
Anastasio Germonio was born on 27 Feb 1551 in Mondovì, Italy. On 12 Nov 1607, he was appointed during the papacy of Pope Paul V as Archbishop of Tarentaise. On 30 Dec 1607, he was consecrated bishop by Domenico Pinelli (seniore), Cardinal-Bishop of Ostia e Velletri, with Vincenzo Querini, Archbishop of Corfù, and Metello Bichi, Bishop Emeritus of Sovana, serving as co-consecrators.

As archdeacon at Turin he was a member of the commission appointed by Pope Clement VIII to edit the Liber Septimus decretalium (later known as the Constitutiones Clementinae); and he also wrote Paratitla on the five books of the Decretals of Gregory IX. He represented the Duke of Savoy at the court of Rome under Clement VIII and Paul V, and was ambassador to Spain under Kings Philip III and IV.

He served as Archbishop of Tarentaise until his death on 4 Aug 1627 in Madrid, Spain.

Germonius is best known for his treatise on ambassadors, De legatis principum et populorum libri tres (Rome, 1627). According to the Encyclopædia Britannica Eleventh Edition, "[t]he book is diffuse, pedantic and somewhat heavy in style, but valuable historically as written by a theorist who was also an expert man of affairs."

== Works ==
- De sacrorum immunitatibus (in Latin). Rome: erede Bartolomeo Zanetti. 1623.
- Paratitla super quinque libros Decretalium (in Latin). Rome: erede Bartolomeo Zanetti. 1623.
- De legatis principum et populorum libri tres, Rome, 1627.

== External links and additional sources ==
- Cheney, David M. "Diocese of Tarentaise". Catholic-Hierarchy.org. (for Chronology of Bishops) ^{[self-published]}
- Chow, Gabriel. "Diocese of Tarentaise (France)". GCatholic.org. (for Chronology of Bishops) ^{[self-published]}

Catholic Church titles
Preceded by Jean-François Berliet	Archbishop of Tarentaise; 1607–1627	Succeeded by Benoît-Théophile de Chevron Villette
