= Giovanni Paolo Lancelotti =

Giovanni Paolo Lancelotti was an Italian canonist.

== Biography ==
He was born in Perugia in 1522. He graduated as a doctor of law in 1546, and taught law shortly afterwards (1547 or 1548) in the university of his native town. Except for two short sojourns in Rome, he passed the remainder of his life in Perugia, in the study of law and belles-lettres. He died there on 23 September 1590.

== Works ==
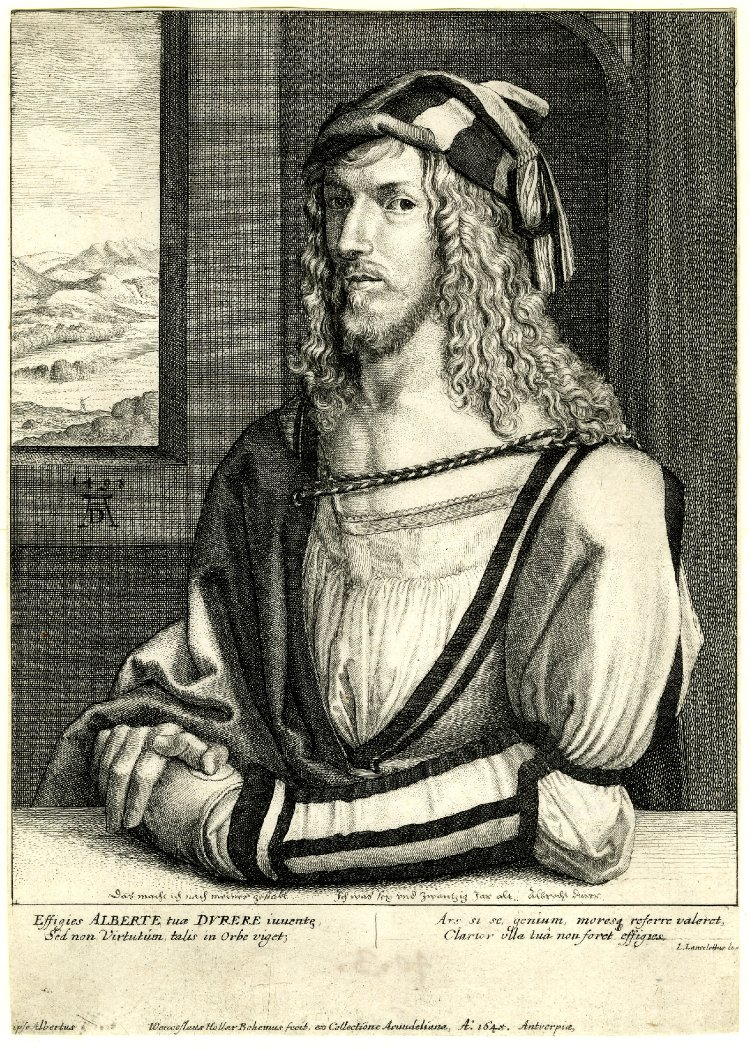
A self-portrait by Albrecht Dürer with Latin verses by Lancelotti at bottom right.

Lancelotti's major work was the Institutiones Juris Canonici, the text of which is reproduced in most editions of the "Corpus Juris Canonici". This broad survey of the fundamentals of Catholic canon law was modeled on the Institutes, a similar survey of Roman law commissioned by the Byzantine Emperor Justinian. While Pope Paul IV approved the undertaking, the final work did not receive an imprimatur from either Paul IV or his successor Pius IV.

Lancelotti published the Institutiones at Venice in 1563. The work is divided into four books, treating successively persons, things (especially marriage), judgments and crimes. This division was inspired by a principle of Roman law: Omne jus quo utimur vel ad personas attinet, vel ad res, vel ad actiones (All our law treats of persons, or things, or judicial procedure.) The Catholic Encyclopedia describes it as "a clear, convenient resume of canon law", while criticizing Lancelotti's choice of divisions. These divisions, however, were followed on broad lines by later authors of elementary treatises on canon law, which also often borrowed its title "Institutiones".

A number of later editors added notes and commentaries to the Institutiones, with the intent of bringing it in line with decrees promulgated in the Council of Trent. The best-known editions are those of Doujat (Paris, 1684; Venice, 1739), Durand de Maillane (1770) and Christian Thomasius (Halle, 1715–17).

Lancelotti's other writings are:

- Institutionum juris canonici commentarium (Perugia, 1560; Lyons, 1579), in which he gives the history of the Institutiones
- De comparatione juris pontificii et caesarei et utriusque interpretandi ratione (Lyons, 1574)
- Regularum ex universo pontificio jure libri tres (Perugia, 1587)
- Quaestio an in cautione de non offendendo praestita comprehendantur banniti nostri temporis (Lyons, 1587).

== Sources ==
- Laurent Kondratuk, "L'introduction de la masse Personae-Res-Actiones dans la science canonique (XVIe siècle)", Bibliothèque d'Humanisme et Renaissance, Librairie Droz, 2014, LXXVI/3, pp. 433–449: https://hal.archives-ouvertes.fr/hal-01488282
