= Peter of Benevento =

Italian canon lawyer, papal legate and cardinal

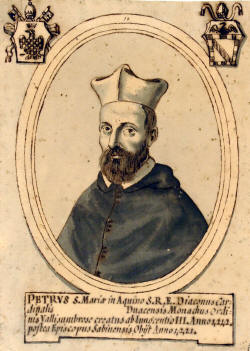

Peter of Benevento (died in September 1219 or 1220) was an Italian canon lawyer, papal legate and cardinal.

He was closely associated with Pope Innocent III, and produced in 1209/10 a collection of his decretals, the Compilatio tertia, as an active editor and competing with that of Bernardus Papiensis.

He was sent in 1214 by Innocent to Provence, and there presided over the 1215 Council of Montpellier, directed against the Albigensians and empowering Simon de Montfort. From there, he took James I of Aragon to Catalonia.

== Bibliography ==
- K. Pennington, The Making of a Decretal Collection: The Genesis of Compilatio tertia. Proceedings of the Fifth International Congress of Medieval Canon Law Salamanca (1980)
- James M. Powell, Innocent III and Petrus Beneventanus: Reconstructing a Career at the Papal Curia, in Pope Innocent II and His World (1999) editor John C. Moore
- Werner Maleczek, Papst und Kardinalskolleg von 1191 bis 1216, Vienna 1984
