= Eastern canonical reforms of Pius XII =

Under Pope Pius XII, there were the several reforms of Catholic Eastern canon law applying to the Eastern Catholic Churches.

== Reforms of Eastern canon law ==
A commission was established in 1929 by Pius XI to draw up a schema for an Oriental Catholic canon code, the Commissionem Cardinalitiam pro Studiis Praeparatoriis Codificationis Orientalis. In 1935, the same pope established another commission with the same goal, the Pontificia Commissio ad redigendum Codicem iuris canonici orientalis, to replace the former.

The Eastern Catholic Churches, not unlike the Latin Church before the Code of 1917, had their own ancient laws, which were not codified. Some reforms of Eastern Church laws for the Eastern Churches were done during the pontificate of Pius XII. The new Church canons promulgated by Pius XII for the government of the Eastern Catholic Churches concern matrimonial law, Church trials, administration of Church properties and religious orders and individual rights.

== Eastern groups in the West ==
After World War II, a new situation developed as millions of united Christians from Eastern Europe and the Middle East emigrated to the West: United States, Western Europe, Canada, South America, and Australia. The new Church law was welcomed, yet in some points, it was critiqued, for not fully adopting to these new Western circumstances. Traditionally, Eastern Christians insisted on legal exemptions, allowing them to keep most of the ancient customs and laws.

== Mystici Corporis Christi ==
Pope Pius XII stated in his encyclical Mystici Corporis Christi those reforms were intended to establish Eastern Catholics as equal parts of the Catholic Church.

== Later developments ==
These individual canon law reforms of Pope Pius XII were revised in 1991. Indeed, the Code of Canons of the Eastern Churches for members of the Eastern Catholic Churches were promulgated on 18 October 1990 by Pope John Paul II and came into effect on 1 October 1991.

== See also ==
- Legal history of the Catholic Church
- Nomocanon
- 1983 Code of Canon Law
