= Domenico Pinelli =

17th-century Catholic cardinal

His Eminence Domenico Pinelli
- Cardinal-Bishop of Ostia e Velletri
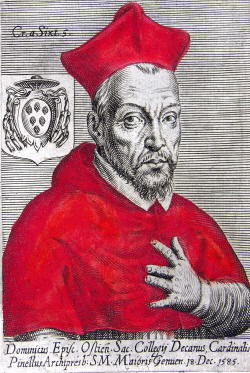
- Church: Catholic Church

Personal details
- Born: 21 Oct 1541 Genoa, Italy
- Died: 9 Aug 1611 (age 69) Rome, Italy

Domenico Pinelli, seniore (1541–1611) was a Roman Catholic cardinal.

== Episcopal succession ==
Episcopal succession of Domenico Pinelli

While bishop, he was the principal consecrator of:

- Antonmaria Sauli, Titular Archbishop of Philadelphia in Arabia and Coadjutor Archbishop of Genoa (1586);
- Ascanio Parisi, Titular Bishop of Hebron and Coadjutor Bishop of Marsico Nuovo (1599);
- Orazio Mattei, Bishop of Gerace (1601);
- Stefano Spínola, Bishop of Ventimiglia (1602);
- Fabio Tempestivi, Archbishop of Dubrovnik (1602);
- Diodato Gentile, Bishop of Caserta (1604);
- Tommaso Confetti, Bishop of Muro Lucano (1606);
- Juan Antonio Bovio, Bishop of Molfetta (1607);
- Anastasio Germonio, Archbishop of Tarentaise (1607);

and the principal co-consecrator of:

- Pedro de Deza Manuel, Bishop of Albano (1600); and
- Lanfranco Margotti, Bishop of Viterbo e Tuscania (1609).

Catholic Church titles
Preceded by Felice Peretti Montalto	Bishop of Fermo; 1577–1585	Succeeded by Sigismondo Zanettini
Preceded by Guglielmo Sirleto	Cardinal-Priest of San Lorenzo in Panisperna; 1586–1591	Succeeded by Agostino Cusani
Preceded by Decio Azzolini (seniore)	Archpriest of the Basilica di Santa Maria Maggiore; 1587–1611	Succeeded by Michelangelo Tonti
Preceded by Charles de Bourbon-Vendôme	Cardinal-Priest of San Crisogono; 1591–1602	Succeeded by Camillo Borghese
Preceded by Antonmaria Salviati	Cardinal-Priest of Santa Maria in Trastevere; 1602–1603	Succeeded by Antonmaria Sauli
Preceded by Simeone Tagliavia d'Aragonia	Cardinal-Bishop of Albano; 1603	Succeeded by Girolamo Bernerio
Preceded by Girolamo Simoncelli	Cardinal-Bishop of Frascati; 1603–1605	Succeeded by Antonio Maria Gallo
Preceded by Girolamo Simoncelli	Cardinal-Bishop of Porto e Santa Rufina; 1605–1607	Succeeded by Girolamo Bernerio
Preceded by Tolomeo Gallio	Prefect of the Congregation of Sacred Rites; 1607–1611	Succeeded by
Preceded by Tolomeo Gallio	Cardinal-Bishop of Ostia e Velletri; 1607–1611	Succeeded by François de Joyeuse
