= Marcus Cetius Faventinus =

Roman author

A 9th-copy of Cetius Faventinus from the Abbey of Fulda

Marcus Cetius Faventinus was a Roman author on architecture active in the late 3rd or early 4th century AD. He wrote a handbook based mainly on earlier authors, especially Vitruvius. It was intended mainly for private builders. Its original title was Artis architectonicae privatis usibus adbreviatus liber ('abridged book of the art of architecture for private uses'), but is now more commonly known as De diversis fabricis architectonicae. It was used by the agricultural writer Palladius and by the encyclopaedist Isidore of Seville. It was also known by Sidonius Apollinaris. There is a modern English translation with a facing Latin edition.

== Bibliography ==
- Holford-Strevens, Leofranc Adrian (2012). "Cetius Faventinus, Marcus". In Simon Hornblower; Antony Spawforth; Esther Eidinow (eds.). Oxford Classical Dictionary (4th ed.). Oxford: Oxford University Press.
- Plommer, Hugh (2009) [1973]. Vitruvius and Later Roman Building Manuals. Cambridge: Cambridge University Press.
- Rizos, Efthymios (2018). "Faventinus, M. Cetius". In Nicholson, Oliver (ed.). The Oxford Dictionary of Late Antiquity, Volume 1: A–I. Oxford: Oxford University Press. p. 588. ISBN 978-0-19-881624-9.
