= Extravagantes =

Part of Corpus Iuris Canonici

The term Extravagantes (from the Latin extra, outside; vagari, to wander) is applied to the canon law of the Roman Catholic Church, to designate some papal decretals not contained in certain canonical collections which possess a special authority. More precisely, they are not found in Gratian's Decretum or the three official collections of the Corpus Juris Canonici (the Decretals of Gregory IX, the Sixth Book of the Decretals, and the Clementines).

== History ==
The term was first applied to those papal documents which Gratian had not inserted in his "Decree" (about 1140), but which, however, were binding upon the whole Church, also to other decretals of a later date, and possessed of the same authority. Bernardus Papiensis designated under the name of "Breviarium Extravagantium", or Digest of the "Extravagantes", the collection of papal documents which he compiled between 1187 and 1191. Even the Decretals of Gregory IX (published 1234) were long known as the "Liber" or "Collectio Extra", i.e. the collection of the canonical laws not contained in the "Decree" of Gratian. This term is now applied to the collections known as the "Extravagantes Joannis XXII" and the "Extravagantes communes", both of which are found in all editions of the "Corpus Juris Canonici".

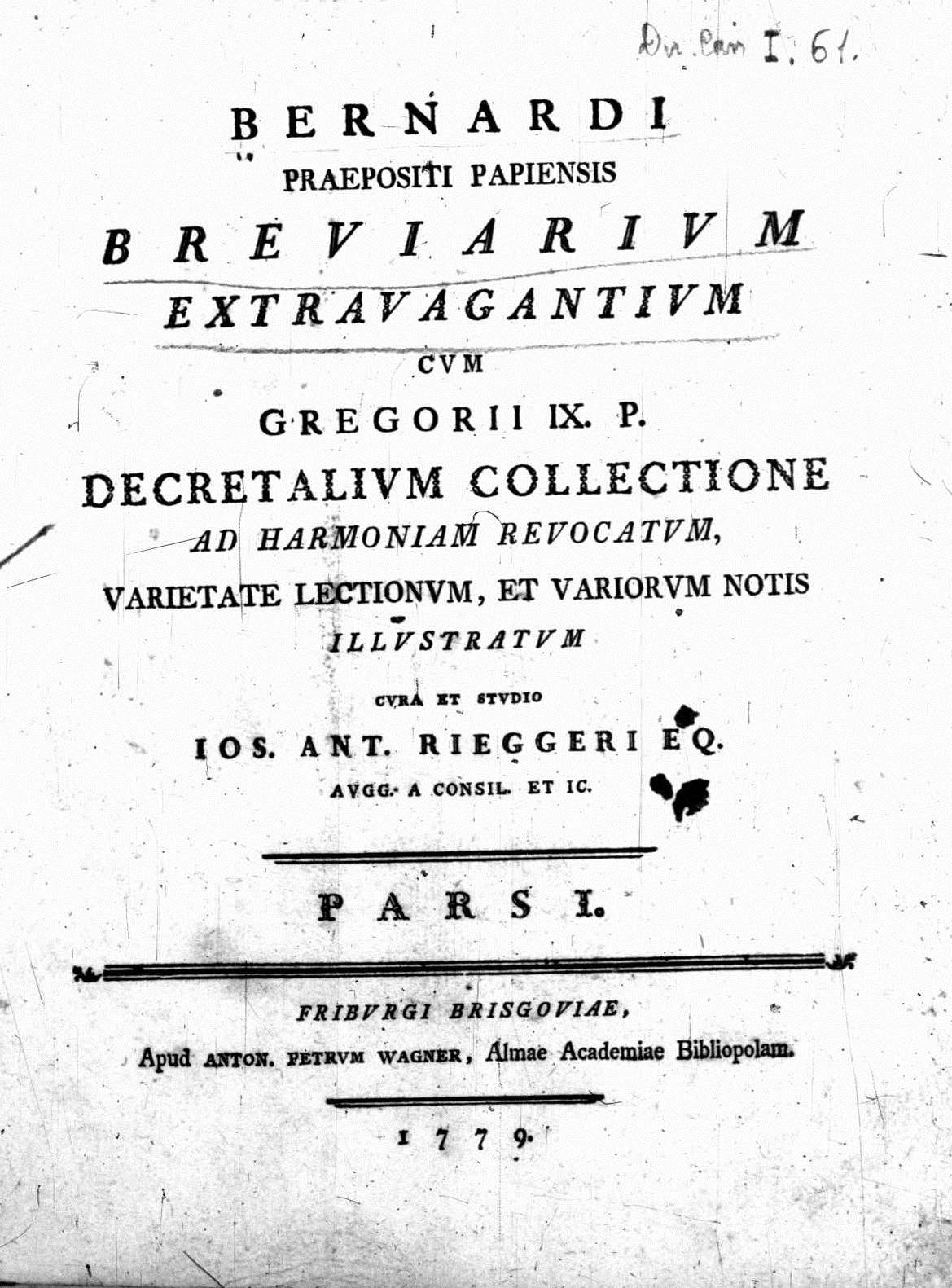
Bernardus Papiensis, Breviarium extravagantium, 1779

When Pope John XXII (1316-1334) published the decretals known as the Clementines, there already existed some pontifical documents binding upon the whole Church but not included in the "Corpus Juris". This is why these Decretals were called "Extravagantes". Their number was increased by the inclusion of all the pontifical laws of later date, added to the manuscripts of the "Corpus Juris", or gathered into separate collections. In 1325 Zenselinus de Cassanis added a gloss to twenty constitutions of Pope John XXII, and named this collection "Viginti Extravagantes pap Joannis XXII".

The others were known as "Extravagantes communes", a title given to the collection by Jean Chappuis in the Paris edition of the "Corpus Juris" (1499-1505). He adopted the systematic order of the official collections of canon law, and classified in a similar way the "Extravagantes" commonly met with (hence "Extravagantes communes") in the manuscripts and editions of the Corpus Juris. This collection contains decretals of the following popes the regnal years of whom span two hundred years, from 1281 to 1482: Martin IV, Boniface VIII (notably the celebrated Bull Unam Sanctam), Benedict XI, Clement V, John XXII, Benedict XII, Clement VI, Urban V, Martin V, Eugene IV, Callistus III, Paul II, Sixtus IV. Chappuis also classified the "Extravagantes" of John XXII under fourteen titles, containing in all twenty chapters.

These two collections have no official value. On the other hand, many of the decretals included in them contain legislation binding upon the whole Church, e.g. the Constitution of Paul II, "Ambitios", which forbade the alienation of ecclesiastical goods. This, however, is not true of all of them; some had even been formally abrogated at the time when Chappuis made his collection; three decretals of John XXII, are reproduced in both collections.

Both the collections were printed in the official (1582) edition of the Corpus Juris Canonici. This explains the favour they enjoyed among canonists.

== See also ==
- Spondent Pariter - a papal decretal which falls into this category issued by Pope John XXII forbidding alchemy.
