= Bernardus Papiensis =

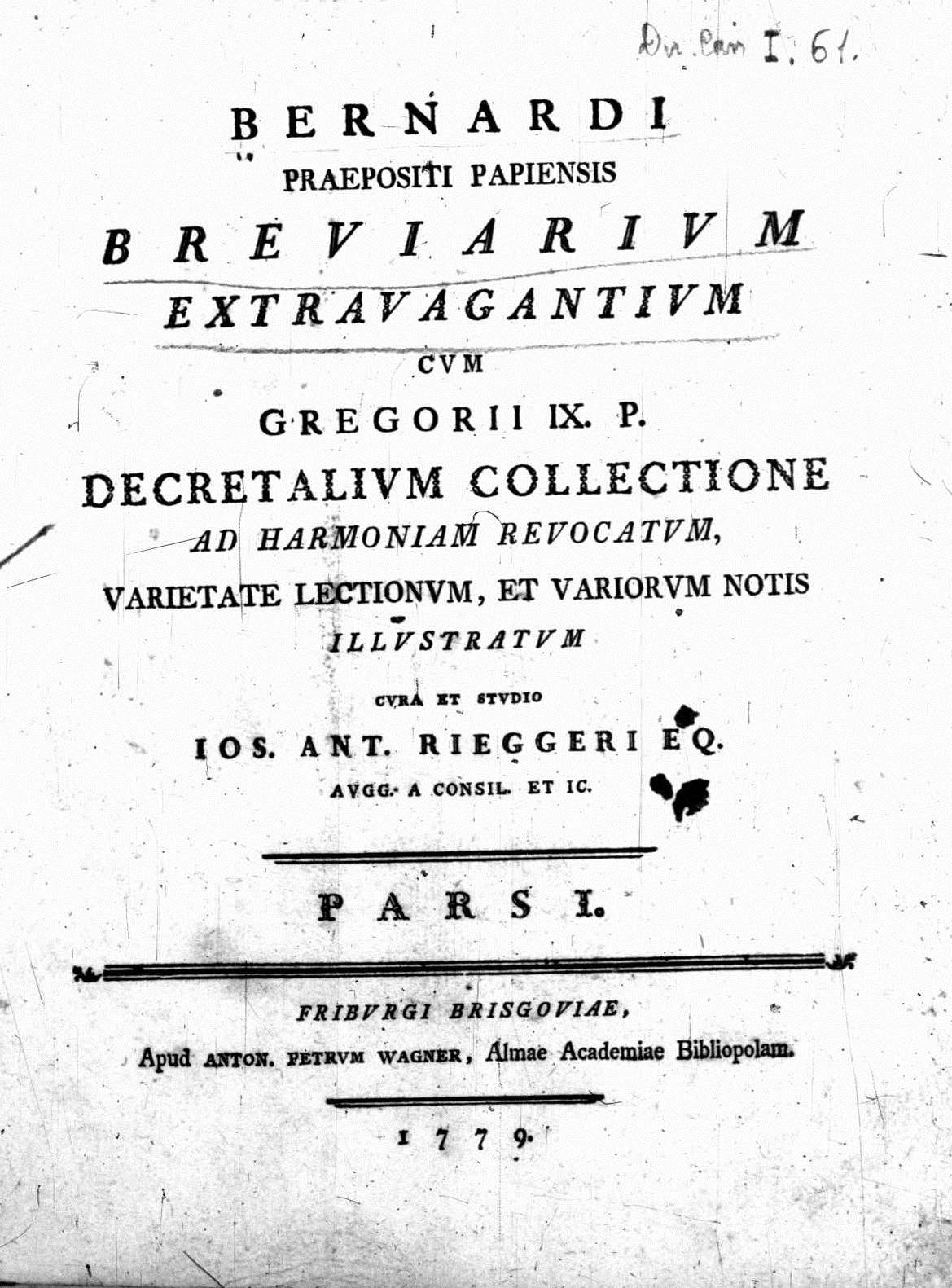
Breviarium extravagantium, 1779

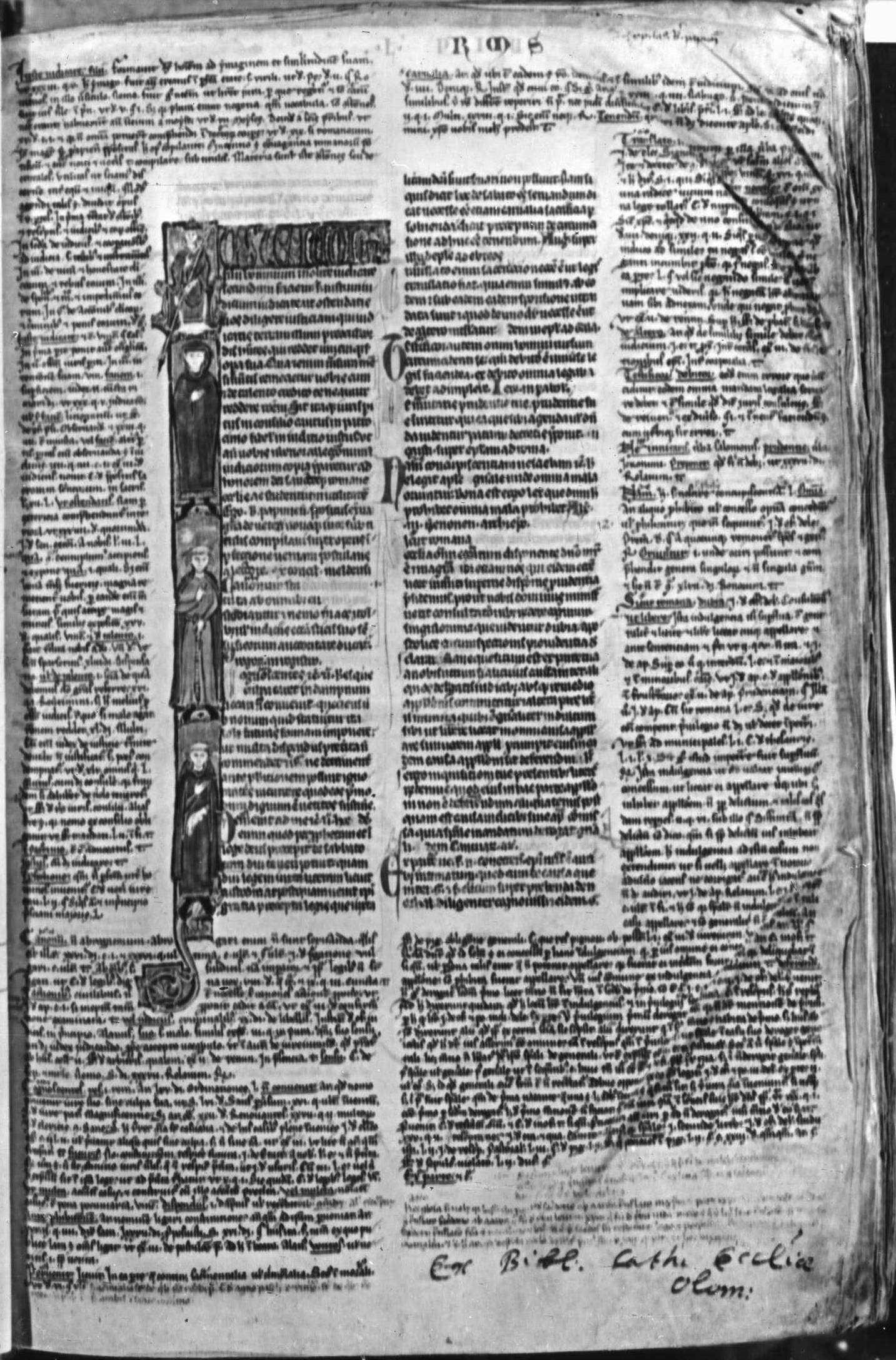
Compilatio I Decretalium, 14th-century manuscript. Olomouc, Zemský archiv v Opavě, Rukopisy, C.O. 589.

Bernardus Papiensis, also known as Bernard of Pavia or Bernard Balbi (pre-1150 – 18 September 1213) was an Italian canonist and bishop of the Catholic Church.

== Career ==
Born at Pavia, Papiensis studied law and theology at Bologna under Gandulphus and Faventinus. Later, he was provost of the cathedral of Pavia until 1191, Bishop of Faenza until 1198, and then Bishop of Pavia until his death there in 1213.

== Works ==
Papiensis' very extensive works on the canon law helped elevate canon law to a legal system in its own right. In particular, Papiensis is renowned for his "Breviarium extravagantium" (later called "Compilatio prima antiqua"), a collection of canonical texts comprising ancient canons not inserted in the "Decretum" of Gratian and also later documents. The work was compiled between 1187 and 1191, and was edited by Friedberg (Quinque compilationes antiquæ, 1882).

Papiensis is the author of a "Summa" on his own compilation, which he wrote while Bishop of Faenza; it was edited by Laspeyres, as were also other works of the same author: Summa de matrimonio, Summa de electione, Casus decretalium, and a gloss on his Breviarium extravagantium (Bernardi Papiensis Summa decretalium, 1861). He is also the author of a Vita sancti Lanfranci (Acta SS., IV Jun., 620 sqq.), a Commentarius in Ecclesiasticum and a Commentarius in Canticum Canticorum.

== Bibliography ==
- Landau, Peter (2001). "Bernardus Papiensis". In Michael Stolleis (ed.). Juristen: ein biographisches Lexikon; von der Antike bis zum 20. Jahrhundert (in German) (2nd ed.). München: Beck. p. 81. ISBN 3-406-45957-9.
- Bernardus Papiensis (1779). Breviarium extravagantium (in Latin). Freiburg im Breisgau: Anton Wagner.
