= John Galensis =

- Born: Wales
- Education: Studied and taught at Bologna
- Occupation(s): Canon law jurist, scholar
- Known for: Glosses and apparatus on canonical texts
- Notable work: Glosses on Compilatio Prima, Compilatio Secunda, and Compilatio Tertia

John surnamed Galensis, Walensis or Wallensis (fl. 1215), was a Welsh canon law jurist.

He taught at Bologna, and wrote glosses, on the Compilatio Prima and Compilatio Secunda. On the Compilatio Tertia he made a formal apparatus, of which there are several manuscripts. The glosses fall between 1212 and 1216, because they were used by Tancred of Bologna.

John has been confused with John of Wales the Franciscan.

== Notes ==
Attribution

This article incorporates text from a publication now in the public domain: Lee, Sidney, ed. (1899). "Wallensis, John (fl.1215)". Dictionary of National Biography. Vol. 59. London: Smith, Elder & Co.
