= Liber Septimus =

Three separate canonical collections

The Liber Septimus (Latin for "Seventh book") may refer to one of three Catholic canon law collections of quite different value from a legal standpoint which are known by this title.

== Constitutiones Clementinae, 1314 ==
The Constitutiones Clementis V or Constitutiones Clementinæ are not officially known as "Liber Septimus". However, they were so designated by historians and canonists of the Middle Ages, and even on one occasion by pope John XXII in a 1321 letter to the Bishop of Strasburg. This collection was not even considered a "Liber" (book).

It was officially promulgated by Clement V in a consistory held at Monteaux, near Carpentras (southern France) on 21 March 1314, and sent to the University of Orléans and the Sorbonne in Paris. The death of Clement V, occurring on 20 April following, gave rise to certain doubts as to the legal force of the compilation. Consequently, John XXII by his bull Quoniam nulla, of 25 October 1317, promulgated it again as obligatory, without making any changes in it. Johannes Andreæ compiled its commentary, or glossa ordinaria. It was not an exclusive collection, and did not abrogate the previously existing laws not incorporated in it (see Corpus Juris Canonici and Papal Decretals).

== Decretales Clementis Papæ VIII, 1598 ==
The name has also been given to a canonical collection officially known as Decretales Clementis Papæ VIII. It owes the name of "Liber Septimus" to Cardinal Pinelli, prefect (president) of the special congregation appointed by Sixtus V to draw up a new ecclesiastical code, who applied this title to it in his manuscript notes; Prospero Fagnani and Benedict XIV imitated him in this, and it has retained the name.

The Decretales Clementis Papæ VIII is divided into five books, subdivided into titles and chapters, and contains disciplinary and dogmatic canons of the Council of Florence, First Lateran Council and that of Trent, and apostolic constitutions of twenty-eight popes from Gregory IX to Clement VIII.

It was to supply the defect of an official codification of the canon law from the date of the publication of the Constitutiones Clementinæ (1317), that Gregory XIII appointed about the year 1580 a body of cardinals to undertake the work. In 1587, Sixtus V established the special congregation to draw up a new ecclesiastical code. The printed work was submitted to Clement VIII in 1598 for his approbation, which was refused. A new revision undertaken in 1607-08 had a similar fate, the reigning pope Paul V declining to approve the Liber Septimus as the obligatory legal code of the Church.

The refusals of approbation by Clement VIII and Paul V are to be attributed not to the fear of seeing the canons of the Council of Trent glossed by canonists (which was forbidden by the bull of Pius IV, Benedictus Deus, confirming the Council of Trent), but to the political situation of the day. Indeed, several states had refused to admit some of the constitutions inserted in the new collection, and the Council of Trent had not yet been accepted by the French government; it was therefore feared that the Governments would refuse to recognize the new code. It also seems a mistake to have included in the work decisions that were purely and exclusively dogmatic and as such entirely foreign to the domain of canon law. This collection, which appeared about the end of the sixteenth century, was edited by François Sentis ("Clementis Papæ VIII Decretales", Freiburg, 1870).

== Seventh Book of Decretals, 1590 ==
Pierre Mathieu (Petrus Matthæus), a canonist of the sixteenth century, published in 1590, under the title of "Septimus Liber Decretalium" ('Seventh Book of Decretals'), a collection of canons arranged according to the order of the papal Decretals of Gregory IX, containing some decretals of preceding popes, especially of those from the reign of Sixtus IV (1464–71) to that of Sixtus V, in 1590. It was an entirely private collection and devoid of scientific value. Some editions of the Corpus Juris Canonici (Frankfort, 1590; Lyons 1621 and 1671; Justus Henning Boehmer's edition, Halle, 1747) contained the text of this "Liber septimus" as an appendix.
