= Decretal =

Catholic legal document

Decretals (Latin: litterae decretales) are letters of a pope that formulate decisions in ecclesiastical law of the Catholic Church.

They are generally given in answer to consultations but are sometimes given due to the initiative of the pope himself. These furnish, with the canons of the councils, the chief source of the legislation of the church, and formed the greater part of the Corpus Iuris Canonici before they were formally replaced by the Codex Iuris Canonici of 1917. However, Cardinal Pietro Gasparri led the papal commission for the revision of canon law and later on published a guide to the fontes (sources) used in the 1917 code. Many canons in this code can easily be retraced in their relationship to and dependency on medieval decretals as well as Roman law.

In themselves, the medieval decretals form a very special source which throws light on medieval conflicts and the approaches to their solution. They are sometimes concerned with very important issues touching on many aspects of medieval life, for example: marriage or legal procedure.

== Definition and early history ==
In a wider sense, the Latin term decretalis (in full: epistola decretalis) signifies a pontifical letter containing a decretum, or pontifical decision.

In a narrower sense, it denotes a decision on a matter of discipline.

In the strictest sense of the word, it means a papal rescript (rescriptum), an answer of the pope when he has been appealed to or his advice has been sought on a matter of discipline.

Papal decretals are therefore not necessarily general laws of the church, but frequently the pope ordered the recipient of his letter to communicate the papal answer to the ecclesiastical authorities of the district to which he belonged; and it was their duty then to act in conformity with that decree when analogous cases arose. It is generally stated that the most ancient decretal is the letter of Pope Siricius (384–398) to Himerius, Bishop of Tarragona in Spain, dating from 385; but it would seem that the document of the fourth century known as Canones Romanorum ad Gallos episcopos is simply an epistola decretalis of his predecessor, Pope Damasus (366–384), addressed to the bishops of Gaul. The decretals ought to be carefully distinguished from the canons of the councils; from pontifical documents touching on Catholic doctrine, from the constitutiones, or pontifical documents given motu proprio (documents issued by the pope without being asked or being consulted upon a subject).

Finally, under the name "decretals" are known certain collections, containing especially, but not exclusively, pontifical decretals. These are the canonical collections of a later date than the Decretum of Gratian (about 1150). The commentators on these collections are named decretalists, in contradistinction to the decretists, or those who commented upon the "Decretum" of Gratian. Eventually some of these collections received official recognition; they form what is now known as the Corpus Juris Canonici. An account follows of the collections of decretals, particularly of those of Pope Gregory IX.

Decretals are known by the first two Latin words that begin the letter, called the incipit.

== Decretal collections ==
The early collections of decretals were not commissioned by the popes. A number of bishops collected decretals and tried to organize them into collections. Burchard of Worms and Ivo of Chartres made influential collections. From the Collectio Francofurtana (around 1180) onwards, collections get a more systematic character, and a school appears, the decretalists, who compile, organise and study the decretals as the basis of canon law. In quick succession, four so-called compilationes appeared between 1191 and 1226, as a sign of the growing importance of papal decretals. The fifth compilation, the Compilatio Quinta, was made by the canonist Tancred (d. about 1235) for Honorius III in 1226, who sent it immediately to the University of Bologna. It was organized into five books.

Pope Gregory IX commissioned the Dominican Raymund of Peñafort to edit a comprehensive collection of papal decretals. This collection of nearly 2,000 decretals appeared in 1234 as the Decretales Gregorii IX, also known as the Liber Extra, which was also immediately sent to the universities of Bologna and Paris. In 1298, Pope Boniface VIII published the next major collection of decretals. He entrusted three canonists with its redaction. This collection is known as the Liber Sextus.

In the 14th century, a few small collections followed: the Constitutiones Clementinae or Clementines (1317), edited by Anastasius Germonius and published by pope John XXII, and the Extravagantes Johannes XXII (1325–1327).

Collections are known as systematic or primitive, the chief distinguishing characteristic being the use of headings to organize the work. This organizational scheme makes a collection systematic.

=== Quinque Compilationes Antiquae Decretalium ===
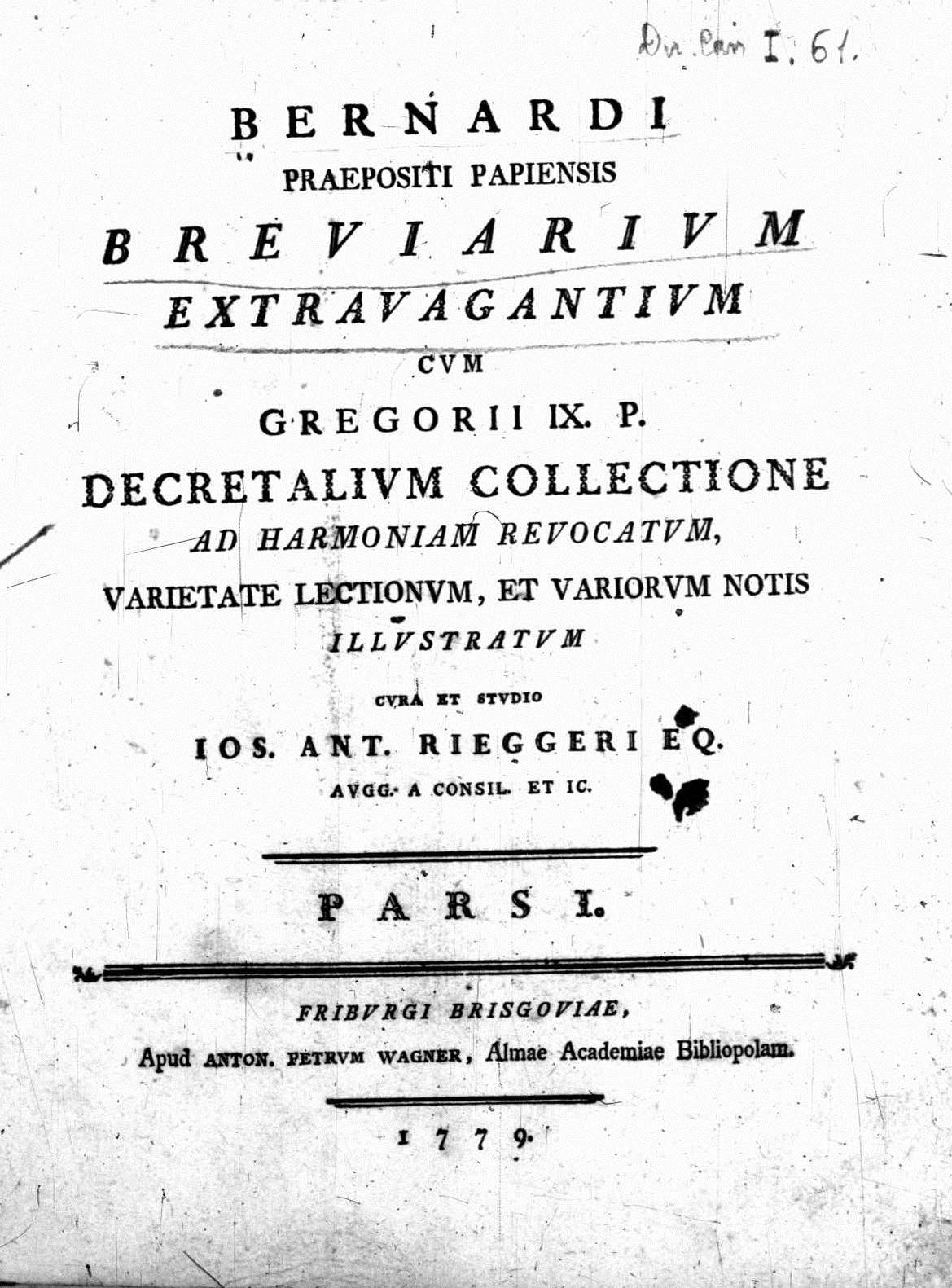
Breviarium extravagantium by Bernardus Papiensis, the first of the five collections called Compilationes Antiquae.

The Decretum of Gratian was considered in the middle of the 12th century as a corpus juris canonici, i. e. a code of the ecclesiastical laws then in force. As such however, it was incomplete and many new laws were made by succeeding popes; hence the necessity of new collections. Five of these collections exhibited pontifical legislation from the "Decretum" of Gratian to the pontificate of Gregory IX (1150–1227). These are known as the "Quinque compilationes antiquæ". On account of their importance they were made the text of canonical instruction at the University of Bologna and, like the "Decretum" of Gratian, were glossed (notes bearing on the explanation and interpretation of the text were added to the manuscripts).

The first collection, the "Breviarium extravagantium" or summary of the decretals not contained in the "Decretum" of Gratian (vagantes extra Decretum), was compiled by Bernardus Papiensis in 1187–1191. It contains papal decretals to the pontificate of Clement III inclusive (1187–1191). The compilation known as the third (Compilatio tertia), written however prior to the second collection (Compilatio secunda), contains the documents of the first twelve years of the pontificate of Innocent III (8 January 1198–7 January 1210), which are of a later date than those of the second compilation, the latter containing especially the decretals of Clement III and Celestine III (1191–1198). The "Compilatio tertia" is the oldest official collection of the legislation of the Roman Church; for it was composed by Cardinal Petrus Collivacinus of Benevento by order of Innocent III (1198–1216), by whom it was approved in the Bull "Devotioni vestræ" of 28 December 1210.

The second compilation, also called "Decretales mediæ" or "Decretales intermediæ", was the work of a private individual, the Englishman John of Wales (Johannes de Walesio, Walensis or Galensis). Around 1216, an unknown writer formed the "Compilatio quarta", the fourth collection, containing the decretals of the pontificate of Innocent III which are of a later date than 7 January 1210 and the canons of the Fourth Lateran Council held in 1215. Finally, the fifth compilation is, like the third, an official code, compiled by order of Honorius III (1216–1227) and approved by this pope in the Bull "Novæ causarum" (1226 or 1227).

Several of these collections contain decretals anterior to the time of Gratian, but not inserted by him in the "Decretum". Bernard of Pavia divided his collection into five books arranged in titles and chapters. The first book treats of persons possessing jurisdiction (judex), the second of the civil legal processes (judicium), the third of clerics and regulars (clerus), the fourth of marriage (connubium), the fifth of delinquencies and of criminal procedure (crimen). In the four other collections the same logical division of the subject-matter was adopted.

=== Decretales Gregorii IX ===
Pope Gregory IX ordered in 1230 his chaplain and confessor, Raymond of Peñaforte (Pennafort), a Dominican, to form a new canonical collection destined to replace all former collections.

=== Later collections ===
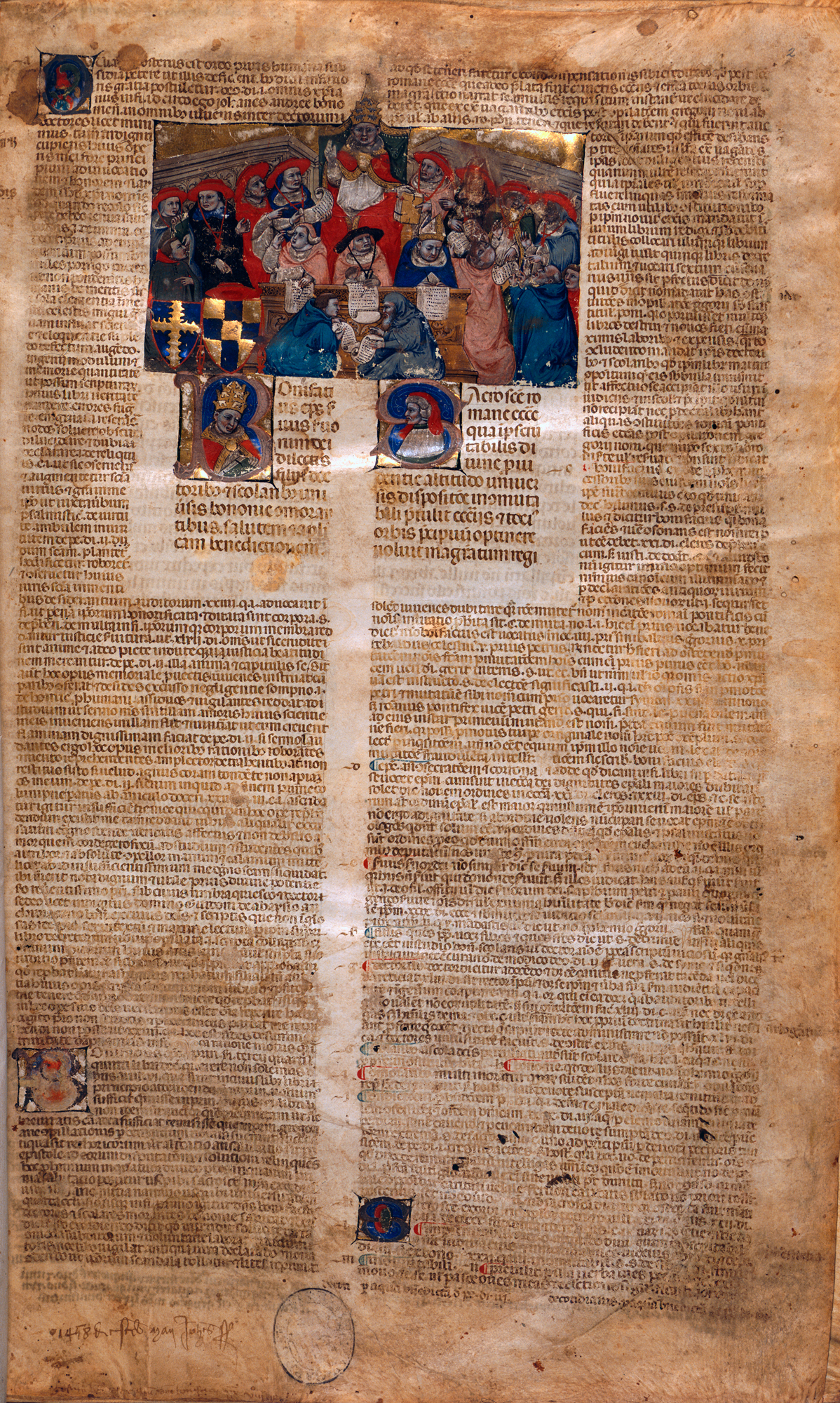
Collection of the Decretals. Illustration: Pope Boniface VIII and his cardinals

The decretals of the successors of Gregory IX were also arranged in collections, of which several were official, notably those of popes Innocent IV, Gregory X and Nicholas III, who ordered their decretals to be inserted among those of Gregory IX. In addition to these, several unofficial collections were drawn up. The inconveniences which Gregory IX had wished to remedy presented themselves again. For this reason, Boniface VIII made a new collection of decretals which he promulgated by the Papal Bull "Sacrosanctæ" of 3 March 1298. This is the "Sextus Liber Decretalium"; it has a value similar to that of the Decretals of Gregory IX. Boniface VIII abrogated all the decretals of the popes subsequent to the appearance of the Decretals of Gregory IX which were not included or maintained in force by the new collection; but as this collection later than that of Gregory IX, it modifies those decisions of the latter collection which are irreconcilable with its own.

Clement V also undertook to make an official collection, but death prevented him from perfecting this work. His collection was published by John XXII on 25 October 1317, under the title of "Liber Septimus Decretalium", but it is better known under the name of "Constitutiones Clementis V" or "Clementinæ". This is the last official collection of decretals. The two following collections, the last in the Corpus Juris Canonici, are the work of private individuals. They are called "Extravagantes", because they are not included in the official collections. The first contains twenty Constitutions of John XXII, and is named "Extravagantes Joannis XXII"; the second is called "Extravagantes communes" and contains the decretals of different popes commonly met with in the manuscripts and editions. They were brought to their modern form by Jean Chappuis in 1500 and 1503.

=== Extravagantes ===
This term (Latin Extra 'outside' + vagari 'to wander') is employed to designate some papal decretals not contained in certain canonical collections, which possess a special authority: they are not found in the Decree of Gratian or the three official collections of the Corpus Juris (the Decretals of Gregory IX, the Sixth Book of the Decretals and the Clementines).

The term was first applied to those papal documents which Gratian had not inserted in his "Decree" (about 1140), but yet were obligatory upon the whole church, also to other decretals of a later date, and possessed of the same authority. Bernardus Papiensis designated under the name of "Breviarium Extravagantium" or Digest of the "Extravagantes", the collection of papal documents which he compiled between 1187 and 1191. Even the Decretals of Gregory IX (published 1234) were long known as the "Liber" or "Collectio Extra", i.e. the collection of the canonical laws not contained in the "Decree" of Gratian.

This term is now applied to the collections known as the "Extravagantes Joannis XXII" and the "Extravagantes communes", both of which are found in all editions of the Corpus Juris Canonici. When Pope John XXII (1316–1334) published the decretals known as the Clementines, there already existed some pontifical documents, obligatory upon the whole church but not included in the "Corpus Juris". This is why these Decretals were called "Extravagantes". Their number was increased by the inclusion of all the pontifical laws of later date, added to the manuscripts of the "Corpus Juris", or gathered into separate collections.

In 1325, Zenselinus de Cassanis added a gloss to twenty constitutions of Pope John XXII, and named this collection "Viginti Extravagantes pap Joannis XXII". The others were known as "Extravagantes communes", a title given to the collection by Jean Chappuis in the Paris edition of the "Corpus Juris" (1499 1505). He adopted the systematic order of the official collections of canon law and classified in a similar way the "Extravagantes" commonly met with (hence "Extravagantes communes") in the manuscripts and editions of the "Corpus Juris".

This collection contains decretals of the popes Martin IV, Boniface VIII (notably the celebrated Bull Unam Sanctam), Benedict XI, Clement V, John XXII, Benedict XII, Clement VI, Urban V, Martin V, Eugene IV, Callistus III, Paul II and Sixtus IV (1281–1484). Chappuis also classified the "Extravagantes" of John XXII under fourteen titles, containing in all twenty chapters. These two collections are of lesser value than the three others which form the "Corpus Juris Canonici"; they possess no official value, nor has custom bestowed such on them. On the other hand, many of the decretals comprised in them contain legislation obligatory upon the whole church such as the Constitution of Paul II, "Ambitios", which forbade the alienation of ecclesiastical goods. This is however not true of all of them; some had even been formally abrogated at the time when Chappuis made his collection; three decretals of John XXII are reproduced in both collections.

Both the collections were printed in the official (1582) edition of the "Corpus Juris Canonici". This explains the favour they enjoyed among canonists. For a critical text of these collections, see Friedberg, "Corpus Juris Canonici" (Leipzig, 1879, 1881), II.

=== False Decretals ===
The Pseudo-Isidorean Decretals (or False Decretals) are a set of extensive and influential medieval forgeries, written by a scholar or group of scholars known as Pseudo-Isidore. They aimed to defend the position of bishops against metropolitans and secular authorities by creating false documents purportedly authored by early popes, together with interpolated conciliar documents.

== Citations ==
=== Sources ===
- McGurk, J. J. N. (1970). A Dictionary of Medieval Terms: For the Use of History Students. Reigate, UK: Reigate Press for St Mary's College of Education. OCLC 138858.
