= Eastern Catholic canon law =

Canon law for the Eastern Catholic churches

The Eastern Catholic canon law is the law of the 23 Catholic sui juris (autonomous) particular churches of the Eastern Catholic tradition. Eastern Catholic canon law includes both the common tradition among all Eastern Catholic Churches, now chiefly contained in the Code of Canons of the Eastern Churches, as well as the particular law proper to each individual sui juris particular Eastern Catholic Church. Oriental canon law is distinguished from Latin canon law, which developed along a separate line in the remnants of the Western Roman Empire, and is now chiefly codified in the 1983 Code of Canon Law.

== History ==
=== Nomocanons ===
A nomocanon is a collection of ecclesiastical law, consisting of the elements from both the civil law and the canon law. Collections of this kind were found only in Eastern law. The Greek Church has two principal nomocanonical collections.

The first nomocanon is the "Nomocanon of John Scholasticus" of the sixth century. He had drawn up (about 550) a purely canonical compilation in 50 titles, and later composed an extract from Justinian's Novellae Constitutiones in 87 chapters (Note: For the canonical collection see Voellus and Henri Justel, "Bibliotheca juris canonici", Paris, 1661, II, 449 sqq.; for the 87 chapters, Pitra, "Juris ecclesiastici Græcorum historia et monumenta", Rome, 1864, II, 385.) that relate the ecclesiastical matters. To each of the 50 titles was added the texts of the imperial laws on the same subject, with 21 additional chapters, nearly all borrowed from John's 87 chapters.

The second nomocanon dates from the reign of the Byzantine Emperor Heraclius (r. 610–641). It was made by fusion of the Collectio tripartita (collection of Justinian's imperial law) and "Canonic syntagma" (ecclesiastical canons). Afterwards, this collection would be known as "Nomocanon in 14 titles". This nomocanon was long held in esteem and passed into the Russian Church, but it was by degrees supplanted by "Nomocanon of Photios" in 883.

The great systematic compiler of the Eastern Church, who occupies a similar position to that of Gratian in the West, was Photius, Patriarch of Constantinople in the 9th century. His collection in two parts—a chronologically ordered compilation of synodical canons and a revision of the Nomocanon—formed and still forms the classic source of ancient Church Law for the Greek Church.

Basically it was nomocanon in 14 titles with the addition of 102 canons of Trullan Council (see Canon law), 17 canons of the Council of Constantinople held in 861, and 3 canons substituted by Photios for those of the Council of Constantinople in 869. Nomocanon in 14 titles was completed with the more recent imperial laws.

Nomocanon of Photios was retained in the law of the Greek Church and it was included in a collection called Syntagma, published by Rallis and Potlis (Athens, 1852–1859). Even though called Syntagma, the collection of ecclesiastical law of Matthew Blastares in 1335 is the real nomocanon, in which the texts of the laws and the canons are arranged in alphabetical order.

=== Leo XIII ===
Following the example of the famous council of Lebanon for the Maronites held in 1730, and that of Zamosc for the Ruthenians in 1720, the Eastern Churches, at the suggestion of Leo XIII, drew up in plenary assembly their own local law: the Syrians at Sciarfa in 1888; the Ruthenians at Leopol in 1891; and a little later, the Copts.

=== Benedict XV founds the Sacred Congregation for the Oriental Church ===
Until 1917, the Sacred Congregation for the Propagation of the Faith had a division for the "Affairs of the Oriental Rite", which ceased to exist on 30 November 1917. Benedict XV founded the Sacred Congregation for the Oriental Church by the motu proprio Dei Providentis.

The Sacred Congregation for the Oriental Church was presided over by the Supreme Pontiff himself and included several cardinals of the Holy Roman Church, one of which functioned in the capacity of Secretary. There were also Councillors, chosen from among the more distinguished clergy and those experienced in things oriental.

=== Pius XI ===
A commission was established in 1929 by Pius XI to draw up a schema for an Oriental Catholic canon code, the Commissionem Cardinalitiam pro Studiis Praeparatoriis Codificationis Orientalis. In 1935, the same pope established another commission with the same goal, the Pontificia Commissio ad redigendum Codicem iuris canonici orientalis, to replace the former.

=== Reforms of Pius XII ===
With his concern for the Eastern Catholic Churches and their combined ten million members, Pope Pius continued the initiatives of his predecessors, especially Pope Leo XIII and Pope Pius XI. These Churches, not unlike the Latin Church before the Code of 1917, had their own ancient laws, which were not codified. The reform of Oriental Church laws, the CIC Orientalis for the Oriental Churches, was completed during the pontificate of Pius XII. The new, very comprehensive Church laws governed matrimonial law, Church trials, administration of Church properties and religious orders, and individual rights.

== Code of Canons of the Eastern Churches ==
The Code of Canons of the Eastern Churches (CCEO) is the 1990 codification of the common portions of the Canon Law for the 23 of the 24 sui iuris Churches in the Catholic Church. It is divided into 30 titles and has a total of 1540 canons, with an introductory section of preliminary canons. Pope John Paul II promulgated the CCEO on 18 October 1990 by the document Sacri Canones, and the CCEO came into force on 1 October 1991. The 23 sui iuris Churches which collectively make up the Eastern Catholic Churches have been invited by the Catholic Church to codify their own particular laws and submit them to the pope so that all canon law within Catholicism may be fully and completely codified. The Latin Church is guided by its own particular canons found in the 1983 Code of Canon Law.

== Dicastery for the Eastern Churches ==
The Dicastery for the Eastern Churches is a dicastery of the Roman Curia and the curial congregation responsible for contact with the Eastern Catholic Churches for the sake of assisting their development, protecting their rights and also maintaining whole and entire in the one Catholic Church, alongside the liturgical, disciplinary and spiritual patrimony of the Latin Church, the heritage of the various Oriental Christian traditions. It "considers those matters, whether concerning persons or things, affecting the Catholic Oriental Churches" and was founded by the motu proprio Dei Providentis of Pope Benedict XV as the "Sacred Congregation for the Oriental Church" on 1 May 1917.

Patriarchs and Major Archbishops of the Oriental Churches, and the president of the Pontifical Council for Promoting Christian Unity, are members of this Congregation by virtue of the law itself. The consultors and officials are selected in such a way that reflects as far as possible the diversity of rites.

This congregation has authority over

1. all matters which relate to the Oriental Churches referred to the Holy See (structure and organisation of the Churches; exercise of the offices of teaching, sanctifying and ruling; status, rights and obligations of persons) and
2. the ad limina visits of Eastern bishops.

This congregation's competence does not include the exclusive competence of the Congregations for the Doctrine of the Faith and for the Causes of Saints, of the Apostolic Penitentiary, the Signatura, and the Rota (including what pertains to dispensations for a marriage ratum sed non consummatum. (Note: This is according to Pastor Bonus article 58 §2. However, in 2011, Pope Benedict XVI amended Pastor Bonus with the motu proprio Quaerit Semper, thereby transferring jurisdiction over ratified and non-consummated marriage from the Congregation for Divine Worship and the Discipline of the Sacraments to a special Office of the Tribunal of the Roman Rota. The law obrogated the provision stating the 'exclusive competence' of the Congregation for Divine Worship regarding these marriages, for this provision was not expressly abrogated and the Office at the Roman Rota now oversees dispensations from such marriages.) In matters which affect the Eastern as well as the Latin Churches, the Congregation operates, if the matter is important enough, in consultation with the Dicastery that has competence in the matter for the Latin Church.

The Congregation pays special attention to communities of Eastern Catholic faithful who live in the territory of the Latin Church and attends to their spiritual needs by providing visitors and even their own hierarchs, so far as possible and where numbers and circumstances require, in consultation with the Congregation competent to establish Particular Churches in the region.

== See also ==
- Eastern Catholic liturgy
