= Corpus Juris Canonici =

Catholic text of Canon law

The Corpus Juris Canonici (lit. 'Body of Canon Law') is a collection of significant sources of the Canon law of the Catholic Church that was applicable to the Latin Church. It was replaced by the 1917 Code of Canon Law which went into effect in 1918. The 1917 Code was later replaced by the 1983 Code of Canon Law, the codification of canon law currently in effect for the Latin Church.

The Corpus Juris Canonici was used in canonical courts of the Catholic Church such as those in each diocese and in the courts of appeal at the Roman Curia such as the Roman Rota.

== Definitions ==
The term Corpus Juris Canonici was used to denote the system of canonical law beginning in the 13th century.

The term corpus (Latin for 'body') here denotes a collection of documents; corpus juris, a collection of laws, especially if they are placed in systematic order. It may signify also an official and complete collection of a legislation made by the legislative power, comprising all the laws which are in force in a country or society. The term, although it never received legal sanction in either Roman or canon law, being merely academic phraseology, is used in the above sense when the Corpus Juris Civilis of the Christian Roman emperors is meant.

The expression corpus juris may also mean, not the collection of laws itself, but the legislation of a society considered as a whole. Hence Pope Benedict XIV could rightly say that the collection of his Bulls formed part of the corpus juris. One best explains the signification of the term corpus juris canonici by showing the successive meanings which were usually assigned to it in the past and at the present day.

Under the name of "corpus canonum" ('body of canons') were designated the collection of Dionysius Exiguus and the Collectio Anselmo dedicata (see below). The Decretum of Gratian is already called Corpus juris canonici by a glossator of the 12th century, and Innocent IV calls by this name the Decretales or Decretals of Gregory IX.

Since the second half of the 13th century, Corpus juris canonici in contradistinction to the Roman Corpus Juris Civilis of Justinian I, generally denoted the following collections: the "Decretals" of Gregory IX; those of Boniface VIII (Sixth Book of the Decretals); those of Clement V (Clementinæ) i. e. the collections which at that time, with the Decretum of Gratian, were taught and explained at the universities. At the present day, under the above title are commonly understood these three collections with the addition of the Decretum of Gratian, the Extravagantes (laws 'circulating outside' the standard sources) of John XXII, and the Extravagantes Communes.

Thus understood, the term dates back to the 16th century and was officially sanctioned by Gregory XIII. The earliest editions of these texts printed under the now usual title of Corpus juris canonici, date from the end of the 16th century (Frankfort, 8vo, 1586; Paris, fol., 1587).

In the strict sense of the word the Church does not possess a corpus juris clausum ('closed body of law'), i. e. a collection of laws to which new ones cannot be added. The Council of Basle (Sess. XXIII, ch. vi) and the decree of the Congregation "Super statu regularium" (25 January 1848) do not speak of a corpus clausum; the first refers to "reservationibus in corpore juris expresse clausis": reservations of ecclesiastical benefices contained in the Corpus juris, especially in the Liber Sextus of Boniface VIII, to the exclusion of those held in the Extravagantes described below, and at that time not comprised in the Corpus juris canonici; the second speaks of "cuilibet privilegio, licet in corpore juris clauso et confirmato", i. e. of privileges not only granted by the Holy See but also inserted in the official collections of canon law.

== Jus novum and Corpus juris canonici ==
=== Decretum Gratiani ===
It was about 1150 that Gratian, professor of theology at the University of Bologna and sometimes believed to have been a Camaldolese monk, composed the work entitled by himself Concordia discordantium canonum, but called by others Nova collectio, Decreta, Corpus juris canonici, also Decretum Gratiani, the latter being now the commonly accepted name. He did this to obviate the difficulties which beset the study of practical, external theology (theologia practica externa), i. e. the study of canon law. In spite of its great reputation and wide diffusion, the Decretum has never been recognized by the Church as an official collection.

=== Extravagantes ===
General laws of a later date than Gratian's Decretum have been called Extravagantes (vagantes extra decretum). These were soon gathered in new collections, five of which possessed a special authority, the third and the fifth being the most ancient official compilations of the Roman Church. Among other compilations of the late 12th and early 13th century, the following deserve special attention:

- the appendix concilii Lateranensis III;
- the collections known as Bambergensis, Lipsiensis, Casselana, Halensis, and Lucensis, named after the libraries housing their manuscripts;
- the collection of the Italian Benedictine Rainerus Pomposianus (Collectio Pomposiana), that of the English canonist Gilbert (Collectio Gilberti), that of his countryman Alanus, professor at Bologna (Collectio Alani), and that of the Spaniard Bernard of Compostella (Compilatio Romana).

Soon thereafter, subsequent developments marked the dawn of a new era of official collections.

=== Decretales Gregorii IX ===
In 1230 Gregory IX ordered Raymond of Penyafort to make a new collection, which is called the "Decretals of Gregory IX" (Decretales Gregorii IX). To this collection he gave force of law by the Bull "Rex pacificus", 5 September 1234. This collection is also known to canonists as the "Liber extra", i. e. extra Decretum Gratiani.

=== Liber Sextus ===
Boniface VIII published a similar code on 3 March 1298, called the "Sixth Book of the Decretals" (Liber Sextus), including the Regulæ Juris.

=== Liber Septimus ===
John XXII added to it the last official collection of Canon law, the "Liber Septimus Decretalium", better known under the title of "Constitutiones Clementis V", or simply "Clementinæ" (Quoniam nulla, 25 October 1317).

=== Extravagantes Joannis XXII and Extravagantes communes ===
Later on the canonists added to the manuscripts of the "Decretals" the most important constitutions of succeeding popes. These were soon known and quoted as "Extravagantes", i. e. twenty constitutions of John XXII himself, and those of other popes to 1484. In the Paris edition of the canonical collections (1499–1505) Jean Chappuis drew them up in the form since then universally accepted, and kept for the first the name "Extravagantes Joannis XXII", and called the others, "Extravagantes communes", i. e. commonly met with in the manuscripts of the "Decretals" (see Papal Decretals).

== Legal status and structure of codifications ==
The "Corpus Juris Canonici" was now complete, but it contained collections of widely different juridical value. Considered as collections, the "Decree" of Gratian, the "Extravagantes Joannis XXII" and the "Extravagantes communes" never had a legal value, but the documents which they contain often do possess very great authority. Moreover, custom has even given to several apocryphal canons of the "Decree" of Gratian the force of law. The other collections are official, and consist of legislative decisions still binding, unless abrogated by subsequent legislation.

The collections of Gregory IX (Libri quinque Decretalium) and of Boniface VIII (Liber Sextus) are moreover exclusive. The former, indeed, abrogated all the laws contained in the aforesaid compilations subsequent to the "Decree" of Gratian. Several authors however maintained, but wrongly, that it abrogated also all the ancient laws which had not been incorporated in Gratian. The second abrogated all the laws passed at a later date than the "Decretals" of Gregory IX and not included in itself. Each of these three collections is considered as one collection (collectio una), i. e. one of which all the decisions have the same value, even if they appear to contain antinomies. In cases of contradiction, the decisions of the collections of later date invalidate those found in a collection of an earlier date.

The "Decretals" of Gregory IX, those of Boniface VIII and the "Clementinæ' are divided uniformly into five books (liber), the books into titles (titulus), the titles into chapters (caput), and treat successively of jurisdiction (judex), procedure (judicium), the clergy (clerus), marriage (connubium), and delinquencies (crimen). The rubrics, i. e. the summaries of the various titles, have the force of law, if they contain a complete meaning; on the other hand, the summaries of the chapters have not this juridical value.

== Manner of statutory citation ==
It is customary to quote these collections by indicating the number of the chapter, the title of the collection, the heading of the title, the number of the book and the title. The "Decretals" of Gregory IX are indicated by the letter "X", i. e. extra Decretum Gratiani; the "Sixth Book" or "Decretals" of Boniface VIII by "in VIº" i. e. "in Sexto"; the "Clementines" by "in Clem.", i. e. "in Clementinis". For instance: "c. 2, X, De pactis, I, 35", refers to the second chapter of the "Decretals" of Gregory IX, first book, title 35; "c. 2, in VIº, De hæreticis, V, 2", refers to the second chapter of the "Decretals" of Boniface VIII, fifth book, title. 2; "c. 2, in Clem., De testibus, II, 8", refers to the second chapter of the "Clementines", second book, title 8. If there is only one chapter in a title, or if the last chapter is quoted, these passages are indicated by "c. unic.", and "c. ult.", i. e. "caput. unicum" and "caput ultimum". Sometimes also the indication of the number of the chapters is replaced by the first words of the chapter, as for instance: c. Odoardus. In such cases the number of the chapter may be found in the index-tables printed in all the editions.

The "Extravagantes Communes" are divided and quoted in the same manner as the "Decretals", and the collection is indicated by the abbreviation: "Extrav. Commun." For instance: "c. 1 (or unicum, or Ambitiosæ), Extrav. Commun., De rebus Ecclesiæ non alienandis, III, 4", refers to the first chapter (the only chapter) in book III, title 4 of the "Extravagantes Communes". This collection omits the usual "Liber IV" which treats of marriage. The "Extravagantes of John XXII" are divided only into titles and chapters. They are indicated by the abbreviation, "Extrav. Joan. XXII". For instance: "c. 2, Extrav. Joan. XXII, De verborum significatione XIV" refers to the second chapter of the fourteenth title of this collection.

Very soon after the invention of printing, editions of the "Corpus Juris", with or without the gloss (comments of canonists) were published. The Paris edition (1499–1505) of the two collections of "Extravagantes" includes the gloss. The last edition with the gloss is that of Lyons (1671).

== Post-Tridentine Revision ==
Though the Council of Trent (1545–63) did not order a revision of the text of the canonical collections, St. Pius V appointed in 1566 a commission to prepare a new edition of the "Corpus Juris Canonici". This commission devoted itself especially to the correction of the text of the "Decree" of Gratian and of its gloss. Gregory XIII decreed that no change was to be made in the revised text. This edition of the "Corpus" appeared at Rome in 1582, in ædibus populi Romani, and serves as exemplar for all subsequent editions. The best-known, previous to the 19th century, are those of the brothers Pithou (Paris, 1687), Freiesleben (Prague, 1728) and the Protestant canonist Böhmer (Halle-Magdeburg, 1747). The text of the latter edition differs from that of the Roman edition of 1582, and does not therefore possess practical utility. The edition of Richter (Leipzig, 1833–39) avoids this defect and is valuable for its critical notes. The edition of Friedberg (Leipzig, 1879–81) does not reproduce the text of the Roman edition for the "Decree" of Gratian, but gives the Roman text of the other collections. it is the best and most critical edition.

== See also ==
- Byzantine law
- Code of Hammurabi
- International Roman Law Moot Court
- List of Roman laws
- Twelve Tables

== Notes ==
=== Bibliography ===
- Berman, Harold J. Law and Revolution: The Formation of the Western Legal Tradition (Cambridge, Mass. Harvard University Press, 1983) ISBN 0-674-51776-8.
