= Outline of Catholic canon law =

Laws made and enforced by Catholic Church

The following outline is provided as an overview of and topical guide to the canon law of the Catholic Church:

Catholic canon law is the set of rules and principles (laws) by which the Catholic Church is governed. Law is also the field which concerns the creation and administration of laws.

== Current law ==
- 1983 Code of Canon Law – 1983 codification of canonical legislation for the Latin Catholic Church
  - Omnium in mentem – 2009 motu proprio of Pope Benedict XVI
  - Magnum principium – 2017 apostolic letter by Pope Francis
- Code of Canons of the Eastern Churches – Eastern Catholic code of canon law
- Ad tuendam fidem – 1998 apostolic letter by Pope John Paul II
- Ex corde Ecclesiae – 1990 apostolic constitution of the Catholic Church
- Indulgentiarum Doctrina – 1967 apostolic constitution by Pope Paul VI
- Pastor bonus – Apostolic constitution of John Paul II
  - Pontificalis Domus – Motu proprio issued by Pope Paul VI
- Veritatis gaudium – 2018 apostolic constitution by Pope Francis
- Custom – Repeated and constant performance of certain acts

== Legal history ==
Legal history of the Catholic Church

- 1917 Code of Canon Law

=== Corpus Juris Canonici ===
Corpus Juris Canonici

- Decretist
- Regulæ Juris
- Decretals of Gregory IX
  - Decretalist
- Decretum Gratiani
- Extravagantes
- Liber Septimus

=== Ancient church orders ===
Ancient church orders

- Didache
- The Apostolic Constitutions
  - Canons of the Apostles

=== Collections of ancient canons ===
Collections of ancient canons – Overview of ancient Christian laws

- Collectiones canonum Dionysianae – Collections of canon law compiled by Dionysius Exiguus in the 6th century
- Collectio canonum quadripartita – Medieval canon law collection
- Collectio canonum Quesnelliana – Late antique canonical collection
- Collectio canonum Wigorniensis – Medieval canon law collection

=== Other ===
- Pseudo-Isidorian Decretals
- Benedictus Deus (Pius IV)
- Contractum trinius
- Defect of birth
- Jus exclusivae
- Papal appointment
- Right of option

== Eastern Catholic canon law ==
Eastern Catholic canon law – Canon law for the Eastern Catholic churches

- Code of Canons of the Eastern Churches – Eastern Catholic code of canon law
- Eastern canonical reforms of Pius XII
- Nomocanon – Collection of ecclesiastical law in Eastern Christian tradition
- Archeparchy – Diocese in Eastern Christianity
  - Eparchy – Diocese in Eastern Christianity

== Liturgical law ==
- Ecclesia Dei
- Mysterii Paschalis
- Sacrosanctum concilium
  - Musicam sacram
- Summorum Pontificum
- Tra le sollecitudini

== Sacramental law ==
- Communicatio in sacris
- Ex opere operato
- Omnium in mentem
- Valid but illicit

=== Holy Orders ===
- Impediment
  - Abstemius
- Clerical celibacy
- Nullity of Sacred Ordination
  - Apostolicae curae
- Dimissorial letters
- Approbation

=== Confession ===
- Apostolic Penitentiary
- Complicit absolution
- Canon penitentiary
- Internal and external forum
- Paenitentiale Theodori
- Penitential canons
- Seal of the Confessional

=== Eucharist ===
- Eucharistic discipline
- Canon 915

== Matrimonial law ==
- Banns of Marriage
- Declaration of Nullity
  - Matrimonial Nullity Trial Reforms of Pope Francis
- Defender of the Bond
- Natural marriage

=== Impediments to marriage ===
- Affinity
- Bigamy
- Clandestinity
- Impediment of crime
- Disparity of cult
- Ligamen
- Public propriety

=== Matrimonial dispensation ===
- Ratum sed non consummatum
- Sanatio in radice
- Pauline privilege
- Petrine privilege

== Trials and tribunals ==
- Tribunals
  - Supreme Tribunal of the Apostolic Signatura
  - Tribunal of the Roman Rota
  - Apostolic Penitentiary

=== Tribunal officers ===
- Judicial Vicar/Officialis
- Auditor
- Advocatus Diaboli
- Defender of the Bond

=== Tribunal procedure ===
- Appeal as from an abuse
- Presumption

== Canonical structures ==
=== Particular churches ===
- Particular churches sui juris
  - Latin Church
  - Eastern Catholic Churches
- Local particular churches
  - Abbacy nullius
    - Abbot nullius
  - Apostolic vicariate
    - Apostolic vicar
  - Apostolic administration
    - Apostolic administrator
  - Archdiocese
  - Diocese
    - Aeque principaliter
    - Cathedraticum
    - In persona episcopi
    - Chancery
    - Deanery
      - Vicar forane
  - Archeparchy
  - Eparchy
  - Military ordinariate
  - Mission sui juris
  - Personal ordinariate
    - Anglicanorum Coetibus

=== Juridic persons ===
- Parish
- Roman Curia
  - Dicastery
  - Congregation
  - Pontifical council
  - Personal Prelature

== Jurisprudence ==
- Benefice
- Canonical coronation
  - Canonically crowned images
- Computation of time
- Contract law
- Custom
- Delegata potestas non potest delegari
- Derogation
- Dispensation
  - Taxa Innocentiana
- Indult
- Impediment
- Interpretation
  - Pontifical Council for Legislative Texts
- Jurisdiction
- Peritus
- Obreption & subreption
- Obrogation
- Promulgation
- Resignation of the Roman Pontiff
- Sede vacante
- Vacatio legis
- Valid but illicit

== Philosophy, theology, and fundamental theory of Catholic canon law ==
- Theology
  - Ecclesiology
- Treatise on Law
  - Determinatio

== Law of persons ==
- Person (Catholic canon law)
- Canonical age
- Canonical faculties (Catholic canon law)
- Clerics and public office
- Clerical celibacy
- Consecrated life
- Defect of birth
- Emancipation
- Juridic & physical persons
- Jus patronatus
- Laicization (dispensation)

== Canonical documents ==
- Acta Apostolicae Sedis
  - Acta Sanctae Sedis
- Notary (Catholic canon law)
  - Protonotary apostolic
- Apostolic constitution
- Canon
- Concordat
- Decree
- Decretal
- Encyclical
- Motu proprio
- Ordinance
- Papal brief
- Papal bull
- Penitential
- Positive law
- Rescript

== Penal law ==
- Canon 1324
- Canon 1397 §2
- Censure (canon law)
- Excommunication
  - List of excommunicable offences in the Catholic Church
  - List of people excommunicated by the Catholic Church
    - List of cardinals excommunicated by the Catholic Church
- Interdict
- Internal and external forum
- Laicization (penal)
- Latae sententiae
- Ferendae sententiae
- Lifetime of prayer and penance

== Procedural law ==
Election of the Roman Pontiff

- Universi Dominici gregis
- Papal renunciation

== Academic degrees ==
- Licentiate of Canon Law
- Doctor of Canon Law
- Doctor Juris Utriusque
