= Legal person =

Any entity that is recognised as having privileges and obligations in law

In law, a legal person is any person or legal entity that can do the things a human person is usually able to do in law – such as enter into contracts, sue and be sued, and own property. The reason for the term "legal person" is that some legal persons are not human persons: companies and corporations (i.e., business entities) are persons legally speaking (they can legally do most of the things an ordinary person can do), but they are not, in a literal sense, human beings.

Legal personhood is a prerequisite to legal capacity (the ability of any legal person to amend – i.e. enter into, transfer, etc. – rights and obligations): it is a prerequisite for an international organization being able to sign international treaties in its own name.

== History ==
The concept of legal personhood for organizations of people is at least as old as Ancient Rome: a variety of collegial institutions enjoyed the benefit under Roman law.

The doctrine has been attributed to Pope Innocent IV, who seems at least to have helped spread the idea of persona ficta as it is called in Latin. In canon law, the doctrine of persona ficta allowed monasteries to have a legal existence that was apart from the monks, simplifying the difficulty in balancing the need for such groups to have infrastructure though the monks took vows of personal poverty. Another effect of this was that, as a fictional person, a monastery could not be held guilty of delict due to not having a soul, helping to protect the organization from non-contractual obligations to surrounding communities. This effectively moved such liability to persons acting within the organization while protecting the structure itself, since persons were considered to have a soul and therefore capable of negligence and able to be excommunicated.

In the common law tradition, only a person could possess legal rights. To allow them to function, the legal personality of a corporation was established to include five legal rights—the right to a common treasury or chest (including the right to own property), the right to a corporate seal (i.e., the right to make and sign contracts), the right to sue and be sued (to enforce contracts), the right to hire agents (employees) and the right to make by-laws (self-governance).

Since the 19th century, legal personhood has been further construed to make it a citizen, resident, or domiciliary of a state (usually for purposes of personal jurisdiction). In Louisville, C. & C.R. Co. v. Letson, 2 How. 497, 558, 11 L.Ed. 353 (1844), the U.S. Supreme Court held that for the purposes of the case at hand, a corporation is "capable of being treated as a citizen of [the State which created it], as much as a natural person." Ten years later, they reaffirmed the result of Letson, though on the somewhat different theory that "those who use the corporate name, and exercise the faculties conferred by it," should be presumed conclusively to be citizens of the corporation's State of incorporation. Marshall v. Baltimore & Ohio R. Co., 16 How. 314, 329, 14 L.Ed. 953 (1854). These concepts have been codified by statute, as U.S. jurisdictional statutes specifically address the domicile of corporations.

== Forms ==
There are two kinds of legal persons: human and non-human. In law, a human person is called a natural person (sometimes also a physical person), and a non-human person is called a juridical person (sometimes also a juridic, juristic, artificial, legal, or fictitious person, Latin: persona ficta).

Juridical persons are entities such as corporations, firms (in some jurisdictions), and many government agencies. For most purposes they are treated in law as if they were human persons.

While natural persons acquire legal personality simply by being born or even conceived, juridical persons must have legal personality conferred on them by a legal process and, for this reason, they are sometimes called "artificial" persons. In the most common case (incorporating a business), legal personality is usually acquired by registration with a government agency set up for the purpose. In other cases, legal personhood may result from legislation, such as the manner in which the Charity Commission was created in the UK.

== Natural persons ==
Humans have legal personhood, and it is a general rule that it is acquired upon birth, though legal capacity, a related concept, may be age-restricted for some acts. In Civil Law countries, legal personhood is regulated by the jurisdictions Civil code, like the Code civil of France.

Some international human rights documents and treaties recognise the right to be recognised as a legal person as an individual human right. Examples include Article 6 of the Universal Declaration of Human Rights or Article 3 the American Convention on Human Rights. This serves to prevent humans being stripped of their legal personality, as, for example, slaves were under some systems of slavery. Entities not considered persons would instead be understood as objects, and would be subject to property rights, as slaves were. Nowak considers this right to be one of the rare absolute human rights (meaning it is not possible to restrict it in any way), and additionally non-derogable.

The United Nations Sustainable Development Goal 16 advocates for the provision of legal identity for all natural persons, including birth registration by 2030 as part of the 2030 Agenda.

== Juridical persons ==
Artificial personality, juridical personality, or juristic personality is the characteristic of a non-living entity regarded by law as having the status of personhood.

A juridical or artificial person (Latin: persona ficta; also juristic person) has a legal name and has certain rights, protections, privileges, responsibilities, and liabilities in law, similar to those of a natural person. The concept of a juridical person is a fundamental legal fiction. It is pertinent to the philosophy of law, as it is essential to laws affecting a corporation (corporations law).

Juridical personhood allows one or more natural persons (universitas personarum) to act as a single entity (body corporate) for legal purposes. In many jurisdictions, artificial personality allows that entity to be considered under law separately from its individual members (for example in a company limited by shares, its shareholders). They may sue and be sued, enter into contracts, incur debt, and own property. Entities with legal personality may also be subjected to certain legal obligations, such as the payment of taxes. An entity with legal personality may shield its members from personal liability.

In some common law jurisdictions a distinction is drawn between corporation aggregate (such as a company, which is composed of a number of members) and a corporation sole, which is a public office of legal personality separated from the individual holding the office (these entities have separate legal personality). Historically most corporations sole were ecclesiastical in nature (for example, the office of the Archbishop of Canterbury is a corporation sole), but a number of other public offices are now formed as corporations sole.

The concept of juridical personality is not absolute. "Piercing the corporate veil" refers to looking at the individual natural persons acting as agents involved in a company action or decision; this may result in a legal decision in which the rights or duties of a corporation or public limited company are treated as the rights or liabilities of that corporation's members or directors.

The concept of a juridical person is now central to Western law in both common-law and civil-law countries, but it is also found in virtually every other legal system.

=== Examples ===
Some examples of juridical persons include:

- Cooperatives (co-ops), business organization owned and democratically operated by a group of individuals for their mutual benefit
- Corporations are bodies corporate created by statute or charter. A corporation sole is a corporation constituted by a single member, in a particular capacity, and that person's successors in the same capacity, in order to give them some legal benefit or advantage, particularly that of perpetuity, which a natural person could not have had. Examples are a religious officiant in that capacity, or The Crown in the Commonwealth realms. A corporation aggregate is a corporation constituted by more than one member.
  - Municipal corporations (municipalities) are created by statutes. Other organizations may be created by statute as legal persons, including European economic interest groupings (EEIGs).
- Unincorporated associations, that is aggregates of two or more persons, are treated as juridical persons in some jurisdictions.
- Partnerships, an aggregate of two or more persons to carry on a business in common for profit and created by agreement. Traditionally, partnerships did not have continuing legal personality, but many jurisdictions now treat them as having an independent legal personality.
- Family can be treated as a legal person.
- Companies are corporations – the term often refers to a business association that carries on an industrial enterprise, although companies may take other forms, such as trade unions, unlimited companies, trusts, and funds. Limited liability companies—be they a private company limited by guarantee, private company limited by shares, or public limited company—are entities having certain characteristics of both a corporation and a partnership. Different types have a complex variety of advantages and disadvantages.
- Sovereign states are legal persons.
- In the international legal system, various organizations possess legal personality. These include intergovernmental organizations (the United Nations, the Council of Europe) and some other international organizations (including the Sovereign Military Order of Malta, a religious order).
- The European Union (EU) has legal personality since the Lisbon Treaty entered into force on 1 December 2009. That the EU has legal personality is a prerequisite for the EU to join the European Convention on Human Rights (ECHR). However, in 2014, the EU decided not to be bound by the rulings of the European Court of Human Rights.
- Temples, in some legal systems, have separate legal personality.

Not all organizations have legal personality. For example, the board of directors of a corporation, legislature, or governmental agency typically are not legal persons in that they have no ability to exercise legal rights independent of the corporation or political body which they are a part of.

== Environmental personhood ==
Environmental personhood refers the concept of conferring legal personhood onto natural phenomena, either on nature as a whole, or on singular entities, such as rivers. Among other implications, this leads to such entities having standing in legal proceedings. It can be done through legislation, judicial interpretation or even through a constitution. Examples include:

- The constitution of Ecuador of 2008 for example conferrs rights on nature, thus endowing it with legal personality.
- The Whanganui River was granted legal personality in March 2017 under New Zealand law because the Whanganui Māori tribe regard the river as their ancestor.
- Also, in March 2017, the High Court of Uttarakhand declared the Ganges River a legal "person" in a move that according to one newspaper, "could help in efforts to clean the pollution-choked rivers". As of 6 April 2017, the ruling has been commented on in Indian newspapers to be hard to enforce, with assertions that experts do not anticipate immediate benefits, that the ruling is "hardly game changing", that experts believe "any follow-up action is unlikely", and that the "judgment is deficient to the extent it acted without hearing others (in states outside Uttarakhand) who have stakes in the matter". The Supreme Court of India overturned the decision of the High Court of Uttarakhand in July 2017.

== Worldwide ==
=== India ===
Indian law defines two types of "legal person", the human beings as well as certain non-human entities which are given the same legal judicial personality as human beings. The non-human entities given the "legal person" status by the law "have rights and co-relative duties; they can sue and be sued, can possess and transfer property". Since these non-human entities are "voiceless" they are legally represented "through guardians and representatives" to claim their legal rights and to fulfill their legal duties and responsibilities. Specific non-human entities given the status of "legal person" include "corporate personality, body politic, charitable unions etc," as well as trust estates, deities, temples, churches, mosques, hospitals, universities, colleges, banks, railways, municipalities, and gram panchayats (village councils), rivers, all animals and birds.

==== Corporates and trusts ====
In court cases regarding corporates, the shareholders are not responsible for the company's debts but the company itself being a "legal person" is liable to repay those debts or be sued for the non-repayment of debts.

==== Animal kingdom ====
In court cases regarding animals, the animals have the status of "legal person" and humans have the legal duty to act as "loco parentis" towards animals welfare like a parent has towards the minor children. A court while deciding the "Animal Welfare Board of India vs Nagaraja" case in 2014 mandated that animals are also entitled to the fundamental right to freedom enshrined in the Article 21 of Constitution of India i.e. right to life, personal liberty and the right to die with dignity (passive euthanasia). In another case, a court in Uttarakhand state mandated that animals have the same rights as humans. In another case of cow-smuggling, the Punjab and Haryana High Court mandated that "entire animal kingdom including avian and aquatic" species has a "distinct legal persona with corresponding rights, duties, and liabilities of a living person" and humans are "loco parentis" while laying out the norms for animal welfare, veterinary treatment, fodder and shelter, e.g. animal drawn carriages must not have more than four humans, and load carrying animals must not be loaded beyond the specified limits and those limits must be halved when animals have to carry the load up a slope.

==== Religious deities ====
In court cases regarding religious entities, the deity (deity or god is a supernatural being considered divine or sacred) is also a "legal person" who can engage in legal cases through "trustees" or "managing board in charge of the temple". The Supreme Court of India (SC), while deciding the Ayodhya case of Ram Janmabhoomi, decided in 2010 that the deity Rama in the specific temple was a "legal entity" entitled to be represented by their own lawyer appointed by the trustees acting on behalf of the deity. Similarly, in 2018 the SC decided that the deity Ayyappan is a "legal person" with "the right to privacy" in the court case regarding the entry of women to Sabarimala shrine of Lord Ayyapan.

===== Shebaitship =====
Under the Indian law, the "shebaitship" is the property owned by the deity or idol as a "legal person". Humans appointed to act on behalf of deity are called the "shebait". A shebait acts as the guardian or custodian of deity to protect the right of deity and fulfill the legal duties of the deity. Shebait is similar to a trustee in case the deity or temple does have a legally registered trust or entity. Under the Hindu Law property gifted or offered as rituals or donations, etc absolutely belongs to the deity and not to the shebait. Case example are "Profulla Chrone Requitte vs Satya Chorone Requitte, AIR 1979 SC 1682 (1686): (1979) 3 SCC 409: (1979) 3 SCR 431. (ii)" and "Shambhu Charan Shukla vs Thakur Ladli Radha Chandra Madan Gopalji Maharaj, AIR 1985 SC 905 (909): (1985) 2 SCC 524: (1985) 3 SCR 372".

==== Natural entities such as rivers ====
India and New Zealand both recognised the legal rights of rivers in 2017. In court cases regarding natural entities, the Uttarakhand High Court, mandated that the river Ganges and Yamuna as well as all water bodies are "living entities" i.e. "legal person" and appointed three humans as trustees to protect the rights of rivers against the pollution caused by the humans, e.g. "pilgrims's bathing rituals". The Supreme Court of India overturned the decision of the High Court of Uttarakhand in July 2017.

=== New Zealand ===
Section 29 of the New Zealand Bill of Rights Act 1990 provides: "... the provisions of this Bill of Rights apply, so far as practicable, for the benefit of all legal persons as well as for the benefit of all natural persons."

=== United States ===
In part based on the principle that legal persons are simply natural persons and their organizations, and in part based on the history of statutory interpretation of the word "person", the US Supreme Court has repeatedly held that certain constitutional rights protect legal persons (such as corporations and other organizations). Santa Clara County v. Southern Pacific Railroad is sometimes cited for this finding because the court reporter's comments included a statement the Chief Justice made before oral arguments began, telling the attorneys during pre-trial that "the court does not wish to hear argument on the question whether the provision in the Fourteenth Amendment to the Constitution, which forbids a State to deny any person within its jurisdiction the equal protection of the laws, applies to these corporations. We are all of the opinion that it does."

Later opinions interpreted these pre-argument comments as part of the legal decision. As a result, because of the First Amendment, Congress may not make a law restricting the free speech of a corporation or a political action group or dictating the coverage of a local newspaper, and because of the Due Process Clause, a state government may not take the property of a corporation without using due process of law and providing just compensation. These protections apply to all legal entities, not just corporations.

A prominent component of relevant case law is the Supreme Court decision Citizens United v. Federal Election Commission, which ruled unconstitutional certain restrictions on corporate campaign spending during elections.

==== Case law ====
- In U.S. v. The Cooper Corp., (1941) the court held that the United States government, as a juristic person, could sue under the Sherman Act. Section 7 of the act granted the right to sue only to persons. The corporate defendant, which was accused of illegally conspiring and colluding to raise prices on tires, argued that the U.S. government did not have power to enforce the act because the government was not a person. The court held that the term "person" includes the U.S. Government, and allowed the action against the collusive corporations to continue.
- In Cook County v. U.S. ex rel Chandler, (2003) the county was accused of violating a law which forbids "any person" from falsely obtaining research funds from the government. The county received a $5 million grant, but used it to conduct inappropriate tests on human subjects. The county argued that it could not be held liable because it was not a person. The court held that the county could be sued under the law as a legal person.
- In Rowland v. California Men's Colony, Unit II Men's Advisory Council, (1993) the court declined to extend certain rights to legal persons. The association of prisoners sought to proceed in forma pauperis. The court held that the right to sue in forma pauperis existed only for natural persons, not legal persons.

Other significant cases include:

- Paul v. Virginia ("... in which the United States Supreme Court held that a corporation is not a citizen...")
- Netscape Communications Corp. v. Konrad for what it means for two entities to be separate

== Popular culture ==
In Act II, Scene 1 of Gilbert and Sullivan's 1889 opera, The Gondoliers, Giuseppe Palmieri (who serves, jointly with his brother Marco, as King of Barataria) requests that he and his brother be also recognized individually so that they might each receive individual portions of food as they have "two independent appetites". He is, however, turned down by the Court (made up of fellow Gondolieri) because the joint rule "... is a legal person, and legal person are solemn things."

== See also ==
- Environmental personhood
- European Convention on the Recognition of the Legal Personality of International Non-Governmental Organisations
- Institution
- Intracorporate Conspiracy Doctrine
- List of United States Supreme Court cases, volume 118
- List of legal entity types by country
- Political representation of nature
- Separate legal entity
- Successor liability
