= Computation of time =

Computation of time may refer to:

- Computation of time (Catholic canon law)
- Computation of time (law)

== See also ==
- Process (computing)
