= Computation of time (Catholic canon law) =

Rules for legally-specified time periods

In the canon law of the Catholic Church, the computation of time, also translated as the reckoning of time (Latin: supputatio temporis), is the manner by which legally-specified periods of time are calculated according to the norm of the canons on the computation of time. The application of laws frequently involves a question of time: generally three months must elapse after their promulgation before they go into effect; some obligations have to be fulfilled within a certain number of days, or weeks, or months. Hence the need of the rules for the computation of time.

With the Code of 1917 and the reformed Code of 1983, the legislator has formulated these rules with a clearness and precision that they never had before.

== Scope and nature of rules ==
These rules hold in all canonical matters: universal ordinances, precepts, rescripts, privileges, judicial sentences; but they have nothing to do with problems of chronology or such questions as the determination of the date for the celebration of Easter.

They are not absolute rules, but should be followed when no others have been expressly laid down; liturgical laws regarding, for example, the beginning of the ecclesiastical year, of the solemnity of a feast, remain unchanged. The former use of 'time' in indulgences (prior to Paul VI's revision of sacred indulgences) had special provisions in the 1917 Code (cc. 921, 922, 923, 931), and it is stated that in what pertains to the fulfilment or enforcement of contracts, the prescriptions of the civil law should be complied with, unless there has been some other agreement to the contrary. Nothing prevents inferior legislators from adopting different rules for the application of their own laws, and it is clearly implied that private persons themselves have the same right in matters which depend on their will, like determining when an article sold should be delivered, paid for, etc.

== Useful and continuous time ==
By useful time is meant in law the time granted for the exercise or prosecution of one's rights in such a way that it does not run if one is prevented from using it through ignorance or some other cause.

Continuous time suffers no delay or interruption from one's ignorance or impossibility to act.

Thus colleges which possess the right of appointment to a vacant office are given three months of useful time to exercise it, which implies that if they were prevented, v.g. for ten days, from meeting for the election they would have that many additional days to exercise their right. On the contrary, capitular chapters have eight days after the vacancy of the episcopal see has been made known to them to elect a Vicar Capitular, and it is specified that if no election has been made within that time, whatever be the cause, that right devolves to the Metropolitan (cf. 1917 CIC cc. 161, 432).

== Months ==
Months are computed according to the calendar from the date of publication. A "canonical month" (in contradistinction to a "calendar month") is a period of 30 days, while a "calendar month" is a continuous month.

== Vacatio legis ==
The vacatio legis is computed according to the calendar; for example, if a law is promulgated on 2 November, and the vacatio legis is 3 months, then the law takes effect on 2 February. So a universal law has a vacatio legis of approximately 90 days—3 months taken according to the calendar—while a particular law has a vacatio legis of approximately 30 days—1 month taken according to the calendar—unless specified to the contrary.

== History ==
From 1918 to 1983, Book I, Title III of the 1917 Code of Canon Law regulated the computation of time in the Latin Church.
