= Emancipation (disambiguation) =

Emancipation is any of various efforts to procuring political rights or equality.

Emancipation may refer to:

- Ecclesiastical emancipation
- Emancipation of minors
- Emancipation (sculpture), a statue located in Boston's Harriet Tubman Park
- Emancipation Proclamation (1863) declaring the end of legal slavery in the United States

== Sports ==
- Emancipation (horse) (born 1979), a champion Australian thoroughbred racehorse

== Film and TV ==
- Emancipation (2011 film), a German drama about domestic abuse on men
- Emancipation (2022 film), an American thriller about a black man's escape from slavery
- "Emancipation" (House), a 2008 episode of the medical drama television series
- "Emancipation" (Agents of S.H.I.E.L.D.)
- "Emancipation" (Stargate SG-1), an episode of the science fiction television series

== Music ==
- Emancipation, 1996 album by Prince
- Emancipator (musician) (born 1987), American electronic music producer
- "Emancipation", a song by Extol from the album Synergy
- "Emancipation", a song by Ihsahn from the album angL
- "Emancipation Suite", a series of songs by Stratovarius from the 2009 album Polaris

== See also ==
- Women's liberation movement
- Gender liberation (non-binary gender identities)
