= Laurentius Abstemius =

Italian writer and humanist

- Born: 1440; Macerata, Ancona
- Died: 1508 (aged 67–68)
- Other name: Lorenzo Bevilaqua
- Occupations: Writer, professor of philology

Laurentius Abstemius (c. 1440–1508; modern Italian: Lorenzo Astemio), born Lorenzo Bevilaqua, was an Italian writer and professor of philology, born at Macerata Feltria; his learned name Abstemius, literally "abstemious", plays on his family name of Bevilaqua ("drinkwater"). A Neo-Latin writer of considerable talents at the time of the Humanist revival of letters, his first published works appeared in the 1470s and were distinguished by minute scholarship. During that decade he moved to Urbino and became ducal librarian, although he was to move between there and other parts of Italy thereafter as a teacher.

The work for which he is principally remembered now is Hecatomythium (1495), a collection of a hundred fables written in Latin and largely of his own invention. However, the inclusion together with this work of the thirty-three Aesopic fables translated from the Greek by Lorenzo Valla gave the impression that his own work was of the same kind. Several of the fables of Abstemius, it is true, relate to Aesop's in various ways, either as variations on his, as in the case of De culice cibum et hospitium ab appetente (94), which is told of a gnat and a bee but relates to The Ant and the Grasshopper; or in the case of De leone et mure (52) it provides a sequel to The Lion and the Mouse, in which the mouse asks for the lion's daughter as a reward for freeing him from the net and is stepped on accidentally by the bride.

Still other fables, in the Aesopic manner, provide a frame for proverbs: for example 'Still waters run deep' (De rustico amnem transituro, 5) and 'The worse the wheel, the more it creaks' (De auriga et rota currus stridente, 84). But some quarter of Abstemius' stories belong to the genre of comic anecdotes associated with Poggio Bracciolini and known as Facetiae. One at least, De vidua virum petente (the widow seeking a husband, 31), borrows directly from the collection of Poggio. A few of these sorts of fable particularly were condemned as ludicrous and licentiously critical of the clergy and the work was added to the Vatican index of forbidden books. Abstemius later wrote a further 97 fables in a less extreme vein, Hecatomythium Secundum, published in Fano in 1505.

The fables of Abstemius were frequently reprinted in their own right, as well as added to other collections of Aesopic material, during the 16th century. In particular they can be found annexed to an edition of Aesop's Fables, published in eight volumes at Frankfurt in 1580, and were later translated very idiomatically by Roger L'Estrange in his Fables of Aesop and Other Eminent Mythologists (1692). Translated into French as Hécatomythium ou les fables de Laurent Abstemius traduit du latin (Orléans, 1572), they were the source for several in the later books of La Fontaine's Fables, including "The Vultures and the Pigeons” (VII.8), “Death and the Dying Man” (VIII.1) and “The Women and the Secret” (VIII.6).
