= Taxa (disambiguation) =

Taxa or Taxon may refer to:

- Taxa as the plural of taxon, a concept in biological classification
- Taxa K 1640 efterlyses, a 1956 Danish drama film
- Taxa (TV series), a Danish television series
- Taxa Innocentiana, a 1678 decree by Pope Innocent XI regulating the fees that episcopal chancery offices might demand or accept for various acts, instruments and writings

== See also ==
- Taxonomy (biology)
- Taxonomic diversity
- Taxonomic rank
- Taxonomic relict
