= Sin at-tamyiz =

Sin at-tamyiz (the "age of discernment") refers to the age at which children are able to care for themselves, in the sense of no longer requiring adult assistance to eat, dress, or keep themselves clean. Although it is generally seen as varying individually, Abu Hanifah, founder of the Hanafi school of Islamic jurisprudence, states that it is nine years for a girl and seven for a boy. Following divorce, Islamic fiqh generally prescribes that the mother maintains sole custody of a child prior to this age.

== See also ==
- Baligh/Bulugh
- Age of reason (canon law), the parallel concept in Catholic Christianity
