= 1983 Code of Canon Law =

1983 codification of canonical legislation for the Latin Catholic Church

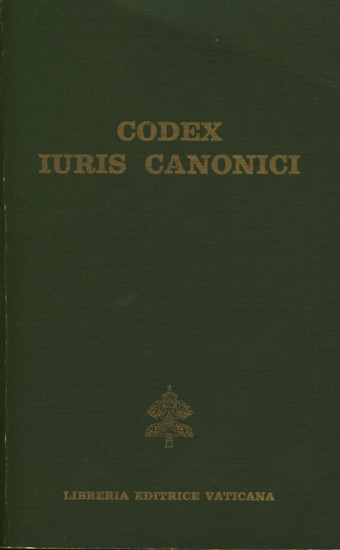
Cover of the 1983 edition of the 1983 Code of Canon Law

The 1983 Code of Canon Law (abbreviated 1983 CIC from its Latin title Codex Iuris Canonici), also called the Johanno-Pauline Code, is the "fundamental body of ecclesiastical laws for the Latin Church". It is the second and current comprehensive codification of canonical legislation for the Latin Church of the Catholic Church. The 1983 Code of Canon Law was promulgated on 25 January 1983 by John Paul II and took legal effect on the First Sunday of Advent (27 November) 1983. It replaced the 1917 Code of Canon Law which had been promulgated by Benedict XV on 27 May 1917.

The 1983 Code of Canon Law is composed of laws called canons.

According to canon 6 of the 1983 code of canon law, the 1983 code abrogates the 1917 code of canon law and any penal laws made under the latter that are not contained in the 1983 code.

== History ==
=== Background ===
The current Code of Canon Law is the second comprehensive codification of the non-liturgical laws of the Latin Church, replacing the Pio-Benedictine code which had been promulgated by Benedict XV in 1917.

Pope John XXIII, when proclaiming a new ecumenical council for the Catholic Church, also announced the intention of revising the 1917 CIC.

=== Work ===
The Pontificia Commissio Codici iuris canonici recognoscendo, which had been established in 1963, worked on revising the 1917 Code of Canon Law through the pontificate of Paul VI, completing the work in the first years of the pontificate of John Paul II.

=== Sacræ disciplinæ leges ===
Sacræ disciplinæ leges Latin for 'Sacred disciplinary laws' Apostolic constitution of Pope John Paul II
- Signature date: 25 January 1983
- Subject: Promulgation of the 1983 Code of Canon Law
- Text: In Latin; In English

On 25 January 1983, with the apostolic constitution Sacrae disciplinae leges, John Paul II promulgated the 1983 Code of Canon Law for all members of the Catholic Church who belonged to the Latin Church. It entered into force the first Sunday of the following Advent, which was 27 November 1983.

In an address given on 21 November 1983 to the participants in a course at the Gregorian University in Rome on the new Code of Canon Law, the Pope described the new code as "the last document of Vatican II".

== Official language ==
While there have been many vernacular translations of the 1983 Code, only the original Latin text has the force of law.

== Ecclesiological inspiration of the 1983 code ==
The Vatican II decree Optatam totius (no. 16), in view of the decision to reform the existing Code, laid down that "the teaching of Canon law should take into account the mystery of the Church, according to the dogmatic constitution De Ecclesia". The 1917 Pio-Benedictine Code was in fact structured according to the Roman law division of "norms, persons, things, procedures, penalties".

John Paul II described the ecclesiological inspiration of the 1983 Code in this way:

The instrument, which the Code is, fully corresponds to the nature of the Church, especially as it is proposed by the teaching of the Second Vatican Council in general, and in a particular way by its ecclesiological teaching. Indeed, in a certain sense, this new Code could be understood as a great effort to translate this same doctrine, that is, the conciliar ecclesiology, into canonical language. If, however, it is impossible to translate perfectly into canonical language the conciliar image of the Church, nevertheless, in this image there should always be found as far as possible its essential point of reference.

Thus the 1983 Code is configured, as far as possible, according to the "mystery of the Church", the most significant books – Two, Three and Four – corresponding to the munus regendi, the munus sanctificandi, and the munus docendi (the "missions" of governance, of worship/sanctification, and of teaching) which in turn derive from the kingly, the priestly and the prophetic roles or functions of Christ.

== Structure in detail ==
The 1983 Code of Canon Law contains 1752 canons, or laws, most subdivided into paragraphs (indicated by "§") and/or numbers (indicated by "°"). Hence a citation of the Code would be written as Can. (or Canon) 934, §2, 1°.

=== Subdivisions ===
The Code is organized into seven Books, which are further divided into Part, Section, Title, Chapter and Article. Not every book contains all five subdivisions. Organized hierarchically, the subdivisions are

- Book (Bk.)
  - Part (Pt.)
    - Section (Sec.)
      - Title (Tl.)
        - Chapter (Ch.)
          - Article (Art.)

Most of the Code does not utilize all these subdivisions but one example is

- "Book II. The People of God;
  - Part II. The Hierarchical Constitution of the Church;
    - Section II. Particular Churches and Their Groupings;
      - Title III. The Internal Ordering of Particular Churches;
        - Chapter II. The Diocesan Curia;
          - Article II. The Chancellor, other Notaries and the Archives."

The basic unit of the Code is the canon. Its subdivisions appear as

- Canon (Can.)
  - Paragraph (§, e.g. §2)
    - Number (°, e.g. 3°)

Some canons contain "numbers" without "paragraphs", while most canons contain "paragraphs", and most "paragraphs" do not contain "numbers".

=== Outline ===
This is the outline of the seven books of the 1983 Code of Canon Law.

- Book I. General Norms (Cann. 1–203)

Explains the general application of laws

- Book II. The People of God (Cann. 204–746)

Goes into the rights and obligations of laypeople and clergy, and outlines the hierarchical organization of the Church

- Book III. The Teaching Function of the Church (Cann. 747–833)

Christian ministry, missionary activity, education, and social communication

- Book IV. The Sanctifying Function of the Church (Cann. 834–1253)

Sacraments and other acts of worship; places of worship; feast-days and fast-days

- Book V. the Temporal Goods of the Church (Cann. 1254–1310)

Ownership, contracts, and wills; akin to the civil Business Law

- Book VI. Sanctions in the Church (Cann. 1311–1399)

Crimes and punishment

- Book VII Processes (Cann. 1400–1752)

Procedural law; trials and tribunals; special processes; penal procedures; administrative procedures

== Summary ==
=== Book I. General Norms (Cann. 1–203) ===
This part of the Codex contains the general rules concerning

- legal sources
- physical and juridic persons
- governance and offices
- the computation of time

Legal sources are laws (including custom as a special way of legislation because of the need of the approval of the legislator), which contain universal regulations, general decrees (legislative or executory), instructions and statutes which refer to a special group, and in case of statutes are legislated by this group itself, and administrative acts, which only decide single cases.

Persons are physical persons or juridic persons. Not everyone is considered a "physical person" according to the definition of the 1983 Code, because one is constituted a person with consequent duties and rights only by baptism.

The Codex specifies conditions for the validity of a juridical act, especially in relation to form, coercion, misapprehension and lack of participation.

Legal power is divided into the three authorities of legislative, executive and judicial. The ability to conduct juridical acts can be attached to an office or it can be delegated to a person. Appointment and loss of ecclesiastical office are regulated.

Time regulates prescription, which goes along with the national regulations, but can only be achieved in good faith, and definitions of time.

=== Book II. The People of God (Cann. 204–746) ===
Book two describes the "People of God". It discusses the general rights and obligations of members of the church, and then discusses the ordering of the church, from the Holy See to the local parish.

The hierarchical constitution of religious and secular institutes and societies of apostolic life is shown to a degree adequate to explain the scope of applicability of the regulations of part two. A religious institute is a society in which members, according to proper law, pronounce public vows. This book is divided into three parts:

- The Christian faithful
- The hierarchical constitution of the church
- Institutes of consecrated life and societies of apostolic life.

The Christian faithful shows the obligations of the faithful in common, those of the lay and those of the sacred ministers or clerics with special consideration of the formation and incardination and excardination of clerics and personal prelatures. Furthermore, the associations of the Christian faithful especially their recognition as a juridic person are constituted, divided in public, private associations and those of the lay.

Part II is entitled, "The Hierarchical Constitution of the Church". This part describes the composition, rights and obligations of the Supreme Authority of the Church, consisting of the Roman Pontiff, the College of Bishops, the Synod of Bishops, the College of Cardinals, the Roman Curia and the Papal legates. A secular institute is an institute of consecrated life in which the Christian faithful, living in the world, strive for the perfection of charity and seek to contribute to the sanctification of the world, especially from within. Societies of apostolic life do not use a vow.

=== Book III. The Teaching Function of the Church (Cann. 747–833) ===
Book III describes the teaching function of the church. The forms of teaching are the ministry of the Divine Word in the forms of the preaching of the word of God and the catechetical instruction, the missionary action of the church, the Catholic education in schools, Catholic universities and other institutes of higher studies and the ecclesiastical universities and faculties, the instruments of communication and books in particular and finally the profession of faith.

=== Book IV. The Sanctifying Office of the Church (Cann. 834–1253) ===
In book four, the function of the church and its religious acts are explained. This book is composed of three parts:

- the sacraments
- the other acts of divine worship
- sacred places and times

The sacraments are baptism, confirmation, the most holy Eucharist, penance, anointing of the sick, holy orders and marriage. These sacraments are described with conditions, ceremony and participants.

Other acts of divine worship are sacramentals, the liturgy of the hours, ecclesiastical funerals, the veneration of the saints, sacred images and relics and the vow and oath.

Sacred places are those which are dedicated for divine worship or for the burial of the faithful. The Code knows five kinds of sacred places: churches, oratories and private chapels, shrines, altars and cemeteries. Sacred times are holy days of obligation, feast days and days of penance.

=== Book V. The Temporal Goods of the Church (Cann. 1254–1310) ===
This part of the Corpus Juris is the regulation of the civil law. There are instructions concerning the acquisition and administration of goods, especially the acquisition by bestowal either through an act inter vivos or through an act mortis causa, the role of pious foundations (canon 1303) and contracts with special care of alienation.

=== Book VI. Sanctions in the Church (Cann. 1311–1399) ===
Book VI contains the canonical equivalent to secular criminal law. The book has two parts:

- Delicts and penalties in general
- Penalties for individual delicts

The first part declares the necessity of a violation of a law and shows the limits and requirements of such a penal law. It determines reasons, which eliminate the punishment as lack the use of reason, nonage (less than seventeen years), mistake in law or facts, missing causality or intent and self-defence. It also describes social cases as complicity, wilful default and attempt. Possible penalties are censures (excommunication and suspension), expiatory penalties (prohibition or an order concerning residence in a certain place or territory, privation of a power, office, function, right, privilege, faculty, favor, title or insignia) and penal remedies and penances. Finally the right of the application and cessation of penalties is regulated.

The canon 1374 made implicit any reference to the penalty of excommunication for Freemasons, that was enforced by the canon 2335 of the code of 1917, which enforced exclusively to the Pope the right to prosecute and excommunicate Roman Catholic Freemasons. In 1981, the Sacred Congregation for the Doctrine of the Faith restated that canon law forbade "Catholics, under the penalty of excommunication, to enroll in Masonic or other similar associations." Membership was still forbidden in a document dated back to 1983, but the emphasis was put on the prohibition against Freemasons receiving Holy Communion.

The second part shows individual delicts, divided into delicts against religion and unity of the church, those against ecclesiastical authorities and the freedom of the church, those against special obligations, those against human life and freedom, usurpation of ecclesiastical functions and delicts in their exercise, and the crime of falsehood. In addition to these cases (and those stated in other laws) the external violation of a divine or canonical law can be punished when the special gravity of the violation demands punishment and there is an urgent need to prevent or repair scandals.

==== 2021 revisions ====
The Catholic Church updated Book VI of its 1983 Code of Canon Law in June 2021 (effective 8 December 2021) for clearer rules on numerous offences, including sexual ones. The revision was the result of a long process commenced in 2009 to better prevent and address Catholic Church sexual abuse cases, mostly committed by clerics against underage children entrusted in their care, but also against vulnerable adults, or other sexual offences the church regards as sinful due to breaching the clerical celibacy in the Catholic Church. Pope Francis, archbishop Filippo Iannone and other officials stated that bishops had been too lenient in penalising offenders in the past, in part because of the vague wording of canon law, and formally introduced laicization as a penalty for certain sexual offences.

In Catholic theology, the Decalogue (or Ten Commandments) are numbered so that the sixth commandment is "Thou shalt not commit adultery". The Catholic Church's interpretation of the sixth commandment is much broader than just adultery (extramarital sex), and concerns a set of offences against chastity. The revised provisions on sexual offences are derived from this broad interpretation of the sixth commandment. The provisions in canon 1395 §3 are coercion-based, as they require evidence of the use of 'force, threats or abuse of his authority'. Canon 1398 §1 describes sexual offences in which the victim was deemed incapable of consenting (because of 'habitually [having] an imperfect use of reason'). There is no freely given sexual consent for people deemed incapable of consenting.

=== Book VII. Processes (Cann. 1400–1752) ===
Book VII contains the legal procedure. It is divided into five parts.

- Trials in general
- The contentious trial
- Special processes
- The penal process
- The method of proceeding in hierarchical recourse and in the removal or transfer of pastors

==== Part I ====
The first part trials in general defines the court system, its two local instances and the Roman Pontiff as the supreme judge with the representation by the tribunals of the Apostolic See, especially the Roman Rota. It determines the participants of the lawsuit, the judge, the auditors and relators, the promoter of justice, the Defender of the Bond, the notary, the petitioner, the respondent, and the procurators for litigation and advocates. Finally it describes the discipline to be observed in tribunals, with the duty of judges and ministers, the order of adjudication, the time limits and delays, the place of the trial, the persons to be admitted to the court, the manner of preparing and keeping the acts, and the actions and exceptions in general and specific.

==== Part II ====
The contentious trial begins with the introductory libellus of litigation and the citation and notification of juridical act. The joinder of the issue occurs when the terms of the controversy are defined by the judge, through a decree of the judge. Further on, this part explains the trial of the litigation, especially the absence of a party, the intervention of a third person and the proofs. There are six kinds of proof: declarations of the parties, documents, testimonies, experts, judicial examination and inspection, and presumptions. After taking evidence the acts are published, the case concluded and then discussed. The case ends with the sentence of the judge. The sentence can be challenged by complaint of nullity and by appeal. Finally the res judicata and restitutio in integrum, the execution of the judgement, the judicial expenses and gratuitous legal assistance are regulated. As an alternative to this contentious trial there is the possibility of an oral contentious process.

==== Part III ====
Part three defines special processes and their special regulations, the process for declaring the nullity of marriage, cases of separation of spouses, process for the dispensation from a marriage ratum sed non consummatum, the process in the presumed death of spouses, and cases for declaring the nullity of sacred ordination. This part also shows methods of avoiding trials.

==== Part IV ====
Part four shows the proceedings of the penal process, with the preliminary investigation, the trial, and the adhesive procedure.

==== Part V ====
The last part shows the methods of proceeding in administrative recourse, which can be made by any person who says he was aggrieved by a decree, and the removal or transfer of pastors with display of the reasons for the removal or transfer.

The final canon, 1752, ends with the teleological and juridical principle that the supreme law of the church is the salvation of souls (commonly formulated Salus animarum lex suprema est.)

== 1917 code abrogation ==
The 1983 code of canon law abrogates the canons and penal laws of the 1917 code that are not contained in the 1983 code. As a result, Catholics are no longer banned from eating horses or reading communist literature, and Catholic women are no longer required to wear head coverings (including veils).

== Amendments ==
After the promulgation of the 1983 Code of Canon Law, popes have amended it several times.

=== Ad tuendam fidem ===
On 18 May 1998 Pope John Paul II issued the motu proprio Ad tuendam fidem, which amended two canons (750 and 1371) of the 1983 Code of Canon Law and also two canons (598 and 1436) of the 1990 Code of Canons of the Eastern Churches, so as to add "new norms which expressly impose the obligation of upholding truths proposed in a definitive way by the Magisterium of the Church, and which also establish related canonical sanctions."

=== Omnium in mentem ===
On 26 October 2009 Pope Benedict XVI issued the motu proprio Omnium in Mentem, which amended five canons (1008, 1009, 1086, 1117, 1124) of the 1983 Code of Canon Law clarifying that, among those in Holy Orders, only bishops and priests received the power and mission to act in the person of Christ the Head while deacons obtained the faculty to exercise the diakonias of service, Word, and charity. The amendments also removed formal defection from the Catholic faith as excusing Catholics from the canonical form of marriage.

=== Mitis Iudex Dominus Iesus ===
On 15 August 2015 Pope Francis issued the motu proprio Mitis Iudex Dominus Iesus, which amended twenty-one canons (1671–1691) to reform the process of determining matrimonial nullity. The document was made public on 8 September 2015.

=== De concordia inter codices ===
On 31 May 2016, Pope Francis issued the motu proprio De concordia inter codices, which amended ten canons (111, 112, 535, 868, 1108, 1109, 1111, 1112, 1116 and 1127) to reconcile the norms of the 1983 Code of Canon Law with those of the Code of Canons of the Eastern Churches. He did so after consultation with a committee of experts in Eastern and Latin canon law organized by the Pontifical Council for Legislative Texts.

=== Magnum principium ===
On 3 September 2017 Pope Francis issued the motu proprio Magnum principium, which amended one canon (838) to grant episcopal conferences authority over liturgical translations.

=== Communis vita ===
On 19 March 2019, Pope Francis issued an apostolic letter given motu proprio Communis vita. It institutes ipso facto dismissal of religious who are absent for a full year illegitimately from their religious house. It replaces canons 694 and 729 in their entirety, with an entry into force on 10 April 2019.

=== Authenticum charismatis ===
On 1 November 2020, Pope Francis issued the motu proprio Authenticum charismatis whereby canon 579 was amended to state that diocesan bishops of the Latin Church are required, for validity, to receive the prior permission of the Apostolic See before issuing a decree of erection of a new religious institute of diocesan right. The vacatio legis was until 10 November 2020.

=== Spiritus Domini ===
The motu proprio Spiritus Domini was released on 11 January 2021; it changes the Code of Canon Law (canon 230 §1) to state that the instituted ministries of acolyte and lector are open to "lay persons", i.e. both men and women, instead of previously "lay men". This change, Francis says, acknowledges a "doctrinal development" that has occurred in recent years.

=== Pascite gregem Dei ===
The apostolic constitution Pascite gregem Dei changed the book VI. Its changes took effect on 8 December 2021.

=== Competentias quasdam decernere ===
The motu proprio Competentias quasdam decernere issued 15 February 2022 changed 10 canons.

=== Recognitum librum VI ===
The apostolic letter issued motu proprio, Recognitum librum VI, issued 26 April 2022 changes one sentence from canon 695.

=== 18 May 2022 rescript ===
Through a rescript published 18 May 2022, Pope Francis changed canon 588 §2 concerning major religious orders. The change made it so that after receiving written permission from the Congregation for Institutes of Consecrated Life and Societies of Apostolic Life, the council of an institute of consecrated life or a society of apostolic life of pontifical rite can nominate or elect a "non-cleric member", i.e., a layperson, as major superior. The change took effect immediately.

=== Expedit ut iura ===
Through a motu proprio entitled Expedit ut iura, released 3 April 2023, Pope Francis changed canon 700 to give members of an institute of consecrated life more time to appeal their dismissal.

=== Le Prelature personali ===
The motu proprio Le Prelature personali of 8 August 2023, issued in Italian and entering into force on the day of its publication, changed canons 295 and 296 in order to specify several details of the nature and governance of personal prelatures such as Opus Dei.

== Notable canons ==
- Canon 285, about Catholic priests' actions unusual to a clergyman, including serving in public offices
- Canon 332 defines papal renunciation
- Canon 844 regulates communicatio in sacris.
- Canon 915 forbids the administration of Holy Communion to those upon whom the penalty of excommunication or interdict has been imposed or declared or who obstinately persist in manifest grave sin.
- Canon 1324 regulates the alleviation of penalties
- Canon 1397 §2 concerns the penalties incurred by those who provide abortion

== Eastern equivalent ==
John Paul II later promulgated a code of canon law for the 22 sui juris Eastern Catholic Churches—the Code of Canons of the Eastern Churches—by means of the apostolic constitution Sacri Canones of 18 October 1990.

== See also ==
- 1917 Code of Canon Law
- Canon law of the Catholic Church
- Code of Canons of the Eastern Churches
- Legal history of the Catholic Church
