= Pascite gregem Dei =

Apostolic constitution

Pascite gregem Dei Latin for 'Tend the flock of God' Apostolic constitution of Pope Francis
- Signature date: 23 May 2021
- Subject: Reform of Latin canon law
- Text: In Latin; In English
- AAS: 113 (6): 534-555

Pascite gregem Dei (Tend the flock of God) is an apostolic constitution issued by Pope Francis on 1 June 2021 which reforms Book VI of the 1983 Code of Canon Law. It took effect on 8 December 2021.

== Background ==
The Catholic Church updated Book VI of its 1983 Code of Canon Law in June 2021 (taking effect on 8 December 2021) for clearer rules on numerous offences, including sexual ones.

The revision was the result of a long process commenced in 2009 to better prevent and address Catholic Church sexual abuse cases, mostly committed by clerics against underage children entrusted in their care, but also against vulnerable adults, or other sexual offences the church regards as sinful due to breaching the clerical celibacy in the Catholic Church. Pope Francis, archbishop Filippo Iannone and other officials stated that bishops had been too lenient in penalising offenders in the past, in part because of the wiggle room the vague wording of canon law allowed for, and formally introduced laicization as a penalty for certain sexual offences.

== Analysis ==
In Catholic theology, the Decalogue (or Ten Commandments) are numbered so that the sixth commandment is "Thou shalt not commit adultery". The Catholic Church's interpretation of the sixth commandment is much broader than just adultery (extramarital sex), and concerns a set of offences against chastity. The revised provisions on sexual offences are derived from this broad interpretation of the sixth commandment. The provisions in canon 1395 §3 are coercion-based, as they require evidence of the use of 'force, threats or abuse of his authority'. Canon 1398 §1 describes sexual offences in which the victim was deemed incapable of consenting (because of 'habitually [having] an imperfect use of reason'). There is no freely given sexual consent for people deemed capable of consenting.

== Examples of changes ==
Some new canons were added to Book VI of the Code of Canon Law, while others were renumbered. For example, canon 1367 was renumbered as canon 1382 § 1; canon 1388 as canon 1386; canon 1382 as canon 1387; canon 1398 as canon 1397 § 2; among many others.

Before the December 2021 reform, the canon 1398 of the 1983 Code of Canon Law of the Catholic Church stated: "A person who procures a completed abortion incurs a latae sententiae excommunication". Due to the reform, the legislation was renumbered as canon 1397 §2 and its wording was changed.

Currently, after the reform, canon 1398 states:

A cleric is to be punished with deprivation of office and with other just penalties, not excluding, where the case calls for it, dismissal from the clerical state, if he:

1. commits an offence against the sixth commandment of the Decalogue with a minor or with a person who habitually has an imperfect use of reason or with one to whom the law recognises equal protection;
2. grooms or induces a minor or a person who habitually has an imperfect use of reason or one to whom the law recognises equal protection to expose himself or herself pornographically or to take part in pornographic exhibitions, whether real or simulated;
3. immorally acquires, retains, exhibits or distributes, in whatever manner and by whatever technology, pornographic images of minors or of persons who habitually have an imperfect use of reason.

== Criticism ==
Critics of the 2021 revision, including Catholic sexual abuse victims advocates, said that the Catholic Church was still attempting to retain control over the prosecution and punishment of suspected sex offenders instead of handing over suspects to the police and civil courts. Because Catholic canon law still does not require anyone within the church to report suspicions to secular authorities, abuse can still be covered up and only leniently punished with no more than laicization or excommunication, according to victims advocate Bart Smeets.

== See also ==
- Vos estis lux mundi
