= Intracorporate Conspiracy Doctrine =

The Intracorporate Conspiracy Doctrine is a common-law doctrine in American law that states that members of a corporation, such as employees, cannot be held to have conspired among themselves because the corporation and its agents constitute a single actor for purposes of the law. Therefore, it is reasoned that no plurality of actors is needed to constitute a conspiracy. However, the doctrine is held not to apply in some areas of law. Furthermore, some areas of law are not uniformly applied the same way throughout the federal circuits.

== See also ==
- Legal person
