= The Vultures and the Pigeons =

Fable

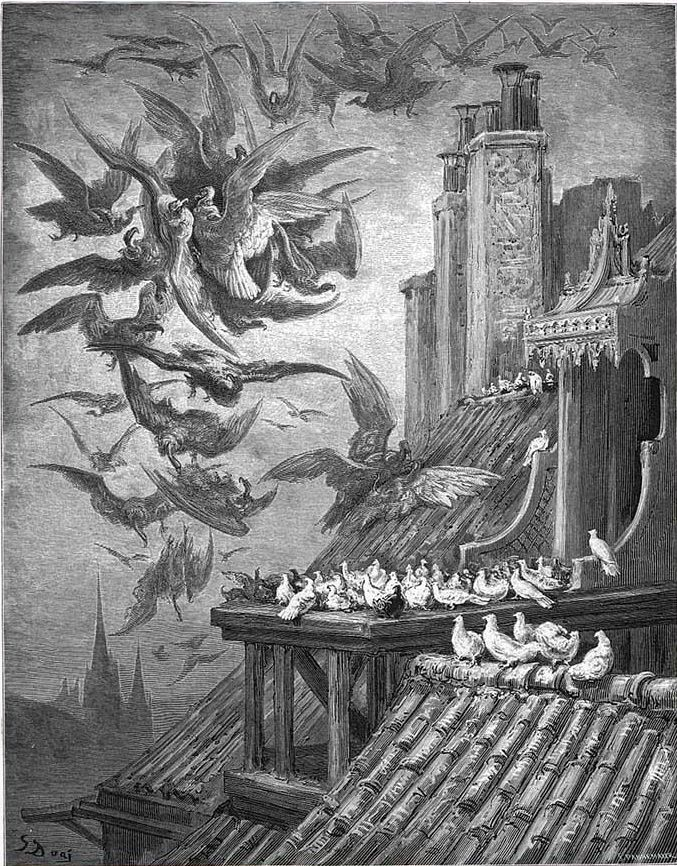
Gustave Doré's illustration of the fable, published in 1880

The vultures and the pigeons is a fable of Jean de la Fontaine adapted from a Latin original by Laurentius Abstemius, where it was titled De acciptribus inter se inimicis quos columbae pacaverant (The warring hawks pacified by doves). Abstemius tells how doves manage to end a conflict between warring hawks, only to have the raptors turn on them instead. His moral is to let well alone so that the vulnerable can live at peace.

In La Fontaine's version, the protagonists are changed to vultures and pigeons (Les vautours et les pigeons) and there are many Classical references not found in the original. It is Mars who has thrown "all the air in ferment" (line 1); the birds concerned are not the doves harnessed by Venus to her chariot (lines 7–8) but vultures, of which so many are killed that "Prometheus on his rock began to hope at last to see the ending of his torture" (lines 15–16). After the pigeons intervene to their own eventual destruction, La Fontaine concludes that it is better to keep the belligerent at war in order to stay safe.

There were two later literary versions in England, each closer to adaptations than faithful translations. In the Select Fables of Charles Denis (London 1754) it is titled "The Vulturs and the Pidgeons". In Brooke Boothby's imitation in Fables & Satires (Edinburgh 1809) the outcome of the peacemaking is compared to the Partition of Poland as the result of concord between former war rivals.

A Latin text titled Accipitres et columbae, but different from that of Abstemius, appeared in successive editions of Christian Friedrich Wilhelm Jacobs' Latin Reader, claiming to be the work of Aesop. Originally published in Munich in 1808, the book saw many reprints and was also adapted in the United States.
