= Presumption (Catholic canon law) =

Term used in canon law

Presumption in the canon law of the Catholic Church is a term signifying a reasonable conjecture concerning something doubtful, drawn from arguments and appearances, which by the force of circumstances can be accepted as a proof. It is on this presumption our common adage is based: "Possession is nine points of the law". Presumption has its place in canon law only when positive proofs are wanting, and yet the formulation of some judgment is necessary. It is never in itself an absolute proof, as it only presumes that something is true. Canonists divide presumption into:

1. presumption of law (juris), or that which is deduced from some legal precept or authority expressed in law or based upon precedents or similarities, and
2. presumption of a judge or man (judicis or hominis), when the law is silent on the subject and an opinion must be formed according to the way that circumstances and indications would affect a prudent man or judge.

== Canon 1584 ==
Canon 1584 of the 1983 Code of Canon Law defines the current canonical jurisprudence around presumption:

A presumption is a probable conjecture about an uncertain matter; one is a presumption of law, which is established by the law itself; another is human, which is formulated by a judge.

This canon of the 1983 Code removes the distinction between relative and absolute legal presumption that was present in the 1917 Code of Canon Law.

== Varieties of presumption ==
There are several sub-varieties of presumption of law. The foundation of these legal presumptions is to be sought in the natural conclusions drawn from the ordinary happenings of common life and the consideration of the motives that usually sway men in given circumstances. The general rules are thus formulated: "What is natural is presumed to be in the person or case in question"; "Change is not to be presumed"; "Presumption is to be formed from the favourable side". As to effects, when there is question of presumption juris, it abstracts from the necessity of proof; not so presumption hominis. A judge can follow the first in civil cases even when doubt remains, not so the second. The former places the burden of proof on the adversary, but the latter does not. Finally, the first is considered of itself equivalent to proof, while the second needs corroboration from something extraneous to itself.

== Presumptio juris ==
A legal presumption (presumptio juris) is a presumption that is stated in the positive canon law (ab ipsa lege). Under the 1917 Code of Canon Law, legal presumption was divided into two kinds: juris tantum "which is relative and vincible by both direct and indirect proof to the contrary", and juris et de jure or absolute presumption which can only be refuted by indirect proof (undermining the fact(s) upon which the presumption is based). This distinction between the subdivisions of legal presumption, the relative (juris simpliciter) and the absolute (juris et de jure) was not continued into the 1983 Code of Canon Law and was dropped.

=== Juris tantum ===
Thus, it is called presumption of law alone (juris tantum) when a thing is judged to be so until the contrary is proved. Hence the legal formula: "Everyone is presumed innocent until his guilt is proved"; "Once bad always bad" (i. e. in the same species of ill-doing, if amendment is not certain); "What is known in a remote place is known in a neighbouring place", and others similar.

=== Juris et de jure ===
It is denominated presumption juris et de jure, when the law so strongly supports the presumption that it is held to be certain in judicial proceedings. Against such a presumption no proofs are admitted except the evident truth. Thus, goods described in the inventory made by a guardian are presumed to belong to the possessions of the deceased, nor would the later testimony of the guardian himself to the contrary ordinarily be admitted.

== Presumptio juris naturalis ==
Natural presumptions (presumptiones juris naturales) fall under the definition of presumptio hominis. According to a generally held opinion of canonists, "presumptions hominis and naturae are, in as far as they are moral, in contrast to presumptions juris or legal presumptions."

Presumptions of the natural law are those presumptions that are not stated in the positive canon law, and as such do not constitute legal presumptions. Some presumptions of the natural law have been incorporated into the Rules of Law. Sometimes judges use natural law presumptions as their basis for judicial presumptions.

=== Judicis or hominis ===
As to the presumption judicis or hominis, it is denoted by the following:

1. It is called vehement, when the probability is very strongly supported by most urgent conjectures. Thus, a birth would be held illegitimate, which took place eleven months after a husband's decease. A vehement presumption is considered equivalent to a full proof in civil causes of not too great importance. As to whether it should have sufficient effect in criminal causes to produce the condemnation of an accused person, canonists do not agree.
2. It is termed probable, when it arises from less urgent and only less probable conjectures and indications. Such presumption is looked on as merely a semi-proof, unless it be sustained by public rumour, in which case it is held as sufficient proof.
3. Finally, it is denominated rash, or temerarious, if it rests on insufficient conjectures or scarcely probable arguments. Such presumption is to be entirely rejected as a proof.
