= Emancipation =

Notion of attaining civil and political rights or equality

Emancipation generally means the liberation of a person from slavery, indentured servitude, guardianship, or other restraints or legal disabilities imposed by a social system or legal code. Emancipation and liberation are often used synonyms; however, scholars have differentiated among the two. In a legal sense, emancipation is an act by which a person who was once under the authority of another is set free from that authority. More broadly, the term is used to refer to the acquisition of economic, social, and political rights and equality, often for a specifically disenfranchised group.

Among others, Karl Marx discussed political emancipation in his 1844 essay "On the Jewish Question", although often in addition to (or in contrast with) the term "human emancipation." One writer summarized Marx's views of political emancipation in this work as entailing "equal status of individual citizens in relation to the state, equality before the law, regardless of religion, property, or other 'private' characteristics of individual people."

"Political emancipation" as a phrase is less common in modern usage, especially outside academic, foreign, or activist contexts. However, similar concepts may be referred to by other terms. For instance, in the United States the Civil Rights movement culminated in the Civil Rights Act of 1964, the Voting Rights Act of 1965, and the Fair Housing Act of 1968, which can collectively be seen as further realization of events such as the Emancipation Proclamation and the abolition of slavery a century earlier. In the current and former British West Indies islands, the holiday Emancipation Day is celebrated to mark the end of the Atlantic slave trade.

Emancipatory identity politics has been described as essentialist.

== Etymology ==
The term emancipation derives from the Latin ēmancĭpo/ēmancĭpatio (the act of liberating a child from parental authority), which in turn stems from ē manu capere (capture from someone else's hand).

== See also ==
- Abolitionism
- Catholic emancipation
- Dunmore's Proclamation
- Ecclesiastical emancipation
- Emancipation of minors
- Emancipation Proclamation
- Emancipation reform of 1861 in Russia
- Emancipist
- Emancipation Day
- Jewish emancipation
- Liberation (disambiguation)
- Manumission
- Political freedom
- Revolution (disambiguation)
- Self-determination
- Tanzimat
- Women's suffrage
- Youth rights
