= Apostolic executor =

Cleric charged with implementing a Papal rescript

An apostolic executor is a cleric who is charged with putting into practice a Papal rescript.
