= The Women and the Secret =

Historic fable

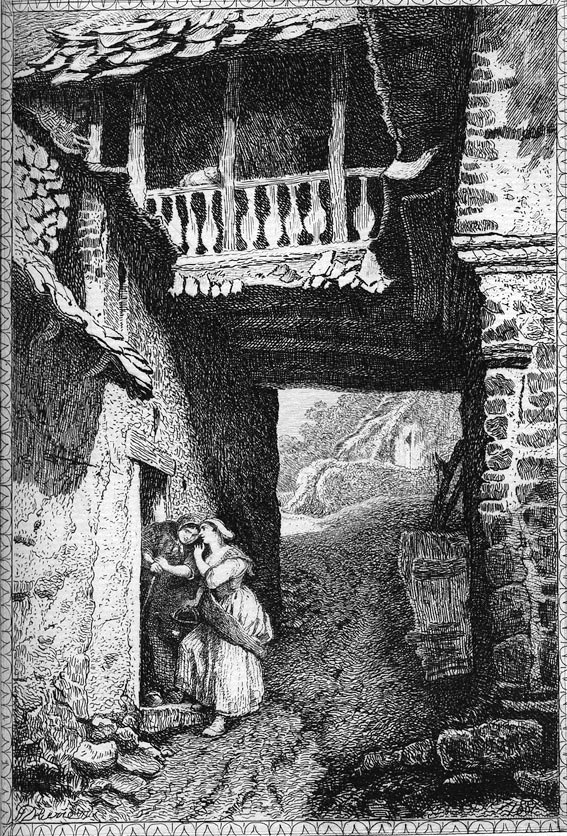
An illustration by Auguste Delierre of La Fontaine's fable, 1883

The women and the secret is a sly fable by La Fontaine (VIII.6), based on a piece of Late Mediaeval misogynistic humour relayed by Laurentius Abstemius.

== A study in exaggeration ==
The title given by Abstemius to his story was "The man who told his wife he had laid an egg" (De viro qui uxori se ovum peperisse dixerat), with the moral that one should not tell a woman anything one wishes to keep secret. Roger L'Estrange translated it two centuries later under the title "A woman trusted with a secret".

Wishing to test his wife, who swears that she can be trusted to keep silent, a husband tells her one night that he has just laid an egg. Scarcely had dawn broken than the woman left her bed to tell a neighbour, who does not hesitate to pass it on with exaggerations of her own. By nightfall after a day of busy gossip, the man is reported to have laid forty eggs. In 1763, Rowland Rugeley went on to intensify the irony of the ending in his paraphrase of La Fontaine's later version, shifting from the simplicity of village life to an urban emphasis on credulity. "Some from this strange phaenomenon,/ Presag'd misfortune to the town,/The fall of States, the death of Kings,/And many more surprising things."

However suited to the end of the 15th century may have been Abstemius' bare anecdote, it needed La Fontaine's seasoned craft as a fabulist to adapt it to the spirit of Renaissance France. Outwardly he did so by exaggerating it further in the telling. The man pretends to lay the egg while in bed with his wife and obtains her promise to stay silent. But since "nothing is so heavy to bear as a secret", she betrays it while it is scarcely light, enjoining secrecy in her turn. This time the number of eggs is swelled by repetition to more than a hundred by day's end.

More subtly, although the story seems told against women, La Fontaine hints at gender reversal throughout the story. At the very start he points out that where gossip is concerned "Many men are women too". The husband takes on the female role by his imposture, in consequence of which he is referred to as 'the egg-layer' (le pondeur) later in the narration. Similar reversals of exclusive prejudice occurred in Creole versions of the fable. Gossip "is a failing of negresses, you say,/ But they're no weaker than a white that way," argued François Marbot (1817-66) of Martinique in Les Bambous (1846). And Rodolphine Young from the Seychelles followed him further in challenging prejudice: "Black women have this weakness, true,/ But whites are even weaker."

== Artistic applications ==
In France there were two dramatic adaptations of the fable. That of 1767 was the one-act comic opera Les femmes et le secret by François-Antoine Quêtant (1733- 1823) and Pierre Vachon. It was followed in 1823 by a similarly titled one-act comedy with musical interludes by W. Lafontaine and Gaspard Touret. The 1843 vaudeville by Edouard Deaddé Saint-Yves and Léon de Villier only borrowed the title and applied it to another situation. There was also a silent film made in 1909 by Gaumont.

Book illustrations of the fable often picture one woman talking to another, or to a group, with a finger raised to her lips to indicate that the story should go no further, as in the 19th century engraving by Tony Johannot. The same gesture persists into Maguy Bourzeix's modern update of the situation. It seems implied too in Gerard Stricher's more abstract treatment of the women's heads in his painting of 2015.
