= Computation of time (law) =

Computation of time or reckoning of time is a legal term which designates how time is calculated in law.

== Use ==
Computation of time is namely used to determinate when a law or another legal document enters into force.

Two possible ways of computing time are the civil time and the natural time. Civil time uses days as units to delineate time; natural time uses hours, and sometimes minutes.

== Roman law ==
Roman law distinguished two methods of computing time: civil time and natural time. Natural time consists in computing time a momento ad momentum. Civil time is reckoned by entire days, thus the hour of the day at which an occurrence took place is not asked. The computation of time by civil reckoning is the rule, and it comes into application where the acquisition of a right depends upon the lapse of a certain time, in which case any hour or moment of the day suffices; however, where the loss of a right depends upon lapse of time, the last day must have wholly expired.

== See also ==
- Vacatio legis
- Sunset provision
