= Cathedraticum =

Money paid annually to a bishop

Cathedraticum (a Latin word from cathedra, episcopal seat or throne) is a specified sum of money to be paid annually toward a bishop. It is a mark of honour and a sign of subjection to the cathedral church, from which its name is derived.

== History ==
=== Jus antiquum ===
In Early Christianity, financing the bishop was tendered rather through custom than by canon law. The earliest legislation on the subject seems to be a canon of the Second Council of Braga (572); according to its decree, only parish churches and chapters were obliged to pay the cathedraticum (Can. Placuit, 10, qu. 3), because at the time of the Council of Braga the sacraments were administered to the faithful in parochial churches only.

=== Jus novum ===
When in the course of time, many other ecclesiastical edifices were built and endowed, it was judged proper that these also should pay the cathedraticum. Hence Pope Honorius III made a universal law (cap. Conquerente, de Off. Ordin.) that not only chapters and parish churches, but also endowed chapels and benefices should be subject to the same tax (Rota coram Tan. decis, 228), which was to be paid to the bishop on the occasion of his annual visitation of his diocese. The amount of the cathedraticum was fixed in ancient times at two solidi (coins; a solidus was one seventy-second part of a pound of gold).

=== Jus novissimum ===
According to canonists, this remains the obligatory amount of the tax, unless custom establishes a different sum. If a smaller amount than the original tax becomes customary in a diocese, the bishop must be content with this reduced pension, nor can he command a return to the higher sum (S. C. C. in Amalph., 1705). In general it is presumed that the quantity of the cathedraticum will be determined by reasonable custom according to the exigencies of various dioceses and countries. Where custom has not fixed the sum, the S. Congregation of the Council declared that either the amount paid by a neighbouring diocese or the equivalent of the original two solidi must be taken as the proper tax (In Albin., 1644).

The regular clergy are not obliged to pay the cathedraticum for their monasteries and conventual churches, as is expressly stated in the "Corpus Juris" (cap. Inter cætera, viii, caus. 10). The reason is found in the very idea of the cathedraticum, which is given by a church or benefice in sign of subjection to the jurisdiction of the bishop. As exempt regulars are immediately subject to the Holy See, there is no obligation on them to pay the cathedraticum. In the case, however, that regulars administer parish churches or secular benefices, they are subject to the tax, inasmuch as such institutions fall under diocesan law. It has also been declared that confraternities which have no churches in the strict sense of the word, but only chapels, are exempt from this episcopal tax ("In Firmana, Cathedr."). As the cathedraticum pertains to episcopal rights, it is privileged and consequently no prescription can totally abrogate it. This is expressly declared by the S. Congregation of the council (In Amalph., 1707), when it decrees that no contrary custom, even of immemorial antiquity, can exempt from the payment of this tax. According to the common law, the cathedraticum is to be uniform for all institutions in a diocese, without regard to the opulence or poverty of the benefices.

Owing to the phraseology of the Council of Trent (Sess. XXIV, cap. ii), a controversy arose as to whether this council had abrogated the cathedraticum. The S. Congregation of the Council gave the following interpretation: "The Council did not abolish the cathedraticum; but desired that it be paid, not at the time of the episcopal visitation, but rather at the diocesan synod." It is owing to the custom of paying this tax at the synod that the name synodaticum has been given to it. By law, however, there is, strictly speaking, no fixed time for making this payment. For although as a rule it is customary to do so in the synod, yet custom or agreement can place it at another time. In fact the S. Congregation of the council has declared that the cathedraticum must be paid, even in those years in which no diocesan synod is celebrated (In Perus., Cathedr., 1735). As the cathedraticum is a mark of subjection to the cathedral church, the bishop cannot exempt any benefice from this tax. On the other hand, he cannot demand it from clerics or priests who have no benefices, even though he pled ancient custom to the contrary (S. C. Ep. In Compsan., 1694). He can require it, however, from the diocesan seminary if benefices have been incorporated with it. In like manner he can demand the cathedraticum from monasteries with which secular churches and benefices have been united. An exception to this law was made, however, for the Order of St. John of Jerusalem in 1630.

All this concerns the laws on the cathedraticum where the Church is canonically established. Obviously, in so-called missionary countries, where benefices are practically unknown, such laws cannot apply. As, however, it is only equitable that the diocese should support its bishop, especially as he has no episcopal benefice, a pension which retains the canonical name of cathedraticum is usually paid to the bishop in most missionary countries. There is no uniform law on the subject. The question necessarily occupied the attention of various synods and the conclusion was unanimous that a tax analogous to the cathedraticum should be imposed on dioceses for the support of their bishops. Thus the Eighth Provincial Council of Baltimore, held in 1855, declared in its seventh decree: "As it is just that the bishop who watches over the salvation of all, should receive from all the faithful of the diocese whatever is necessary for his proper support and for enabling him to execute his office, we decree that he may demand for this purpose a part of the revenues of all churches in which the care of souls is exercised". The Cardinal Prefect of the Propaganda, writing to the bishops of the province of Cincinnati in 1857, says: "The right of the bishop to receive support from his diocese has been recognized; nevertheless, the application and determination of the means of support can best be treated of in diocesan synods, because cognizance can then be taken of the state and condition of each diocese". The Provincial Council of New Orleans in 1856 calls this subsidy the "right of cathedraticum, either to sustain the bishop or to provide for various necessities of the diocese". It states that each bishop of the province should determine the amount in a diocesan synod. In Canada, the Provincial Council of Halifax in 1857 declares: "As the bishop is constituted not for one part but for all parts of his diocese, and as he labours and watches for all alike, all are obliged to contribute for his proper sustenance". The Second Plenary Council of Baltimore in 1866, likewise states that "it is evidently equitable and just that all the faithful of each diocese should contribute to the support of their bishop, who bears the solicitude for all".

As to the determination of the quantity of the cathedraticum, we find the First Provincial Council of Cincinnati requesting Propaganda Fide to sanction some uniform method, but the latter preferred to commit this to the diocesan synods. In the acts of the First Provincial Council of Quebec in 1851, we fine the following scheme "proposed" to Propaganda. It is there said to be similar to that already sanctioned for some bishops in Canada and Ireland: each bishop is to receive a third of the revenues of one or two parishes; or the fourth or fifth part of three or four parishes; or the tenth part of practically all the parishes in his diocese, having regard to the circumstances of each parish. Propaganda sanctioned the employment of the last-named provision in 1852. In the province of Halifax, Canada, it was decreed in 1857 that a collection be taken up annually in October for the support of the bishops. In England, the Third Provincial Council of Westminster in 1859 placed the amount of the cathedraticum at one half pound sterling. It declared that the liability to pay this tax was obligatory on each cathedral chapter; on priests ordained for the mission, who receive salaries from churches or oratories; on those who have the cure of souls; and on all who preside over churches and public oratories unless they can prove a special exemption.

==== Particular law of the United States ====
In the United States, the Eighth Provincial Council of Baltimore, when vindicating the right of the bishop to part of the revenues of the churches, enumerates as such revenues, the renting of pews, the collections taken up during Mass and the offerings made at baptisms and marriages. An identical decree was adopted by the Second Council of the province of Australia in 1869, but Propaganda did not sanction it and declared that the matter should preferably be determined by the various diocesan synods. This was likewise the opinion of the Fathers of the Second Plenary Council of Baltimore in 1866. As a consequence, different methods of computing the cathedraticum prevail throughout the United States. In one prominent diocese, for example, the rector of each church must pay one-fifth of his revenue if it exceed one thousand dollars, or one-third if it be less. The revenue in question is declared to be made up of the pew rents, the collections during Divine service and the funeral stipends. Finally the diocesan arrangement for the cathedraticum has been declared by Propaganda Fide (as in 1872) to be a binding law on those whom it concerns.

== Sources ==
- Catholic Encyclopedia article
