= Obreption and subreption (Catholic canon law) =

Terms in Roman Catholic canon law

Obreption (from Latin obreptio, the act of stealing upon) and subreption (from Latin subreptio, the act of stealing and Latin surripere, to take away secretly) are terms used in the canon law of the Catholic church for species of fraud by which an ecclesiastical rescript is obtained.

In Catholic Canon law, obreption is "the obtaining of or attempting to obtain a dispensation from ecclesiastical authority or a gift from the sovereign by fraud", "a positive allegation of what is false". Subreption in Catholic Canon law is "a concealment of the pertinent facts in a petition, as for dispensation or favor, that in certain cases nullifies the grant", "the obtainment of a dispensation or gift by concealment of the truth".

The terms are also used in the same senses as in Catholic canon law in Scots law.

== Etymology ==
Both words come from the Latin word repo/reptum (genitive), meaning to creep or crawl. The prefix, Ob- means "towards, against, or, in the way of"; Sub- means "under, or, close to".

== Legal requirements ==
Dispensations or graces are not granted unless there be some motive for requesting them, and the law of the Church requires that the true and just causes that lie behind the motive be stated in every prayer for such dispensation or grace.

When the petition contains a statement about facts or circumstances that are supposititious or at least, modified if they really exist, the resulting rescript is said to be vitiated by obreption, which consists in a positive allegation of what is false.

If, on the other hand, silence had been observed concerning something that essentially changed the state of the case, the concealment or suppression of statements or facts that according to law or usage should be expressed in an application or petition for a rescript is called subreption.

Rescripts obtained by obreption or subreption are null and void when the motive cause of the rescript is affected by them. If it is only the impelling cause, and the substance of the petition is not affected, or if the false statement was made through ignorance, the rescript is not vitiated. As requests for rescripts must come through a person in ecclesiastical authority, it is his duty to inform himself of the truth or falsity of the causes alleged in the petitions, and in case they are granted, to see that the conditions of the rescript are fulfilled.

In its effects subreption is equivalent to obreption. Subreption may be intentional and malicious, or attributable solely to ignorance or inadvertence. It may affect the primary, substantial reason or motive of the grant, or constitute merely a secondary or impellent cause of the concession.
