= Contract (Catholic canon law) =

Aspect of canon law

In Catholic canon law, the canon law of contract follows that of the civil jurisdiction in which Catholic canon law operates (Latin contractus; Old French contract; Modern French contrat; Italian contratto).

== "Canonization" of civil contract jurisprudence ==
Sometimes canon law makes the civil law (the law of civil society) its own, giving it the same effect in canon law as if it had actually been promulgated by canonical legislators, subject to the proviso that such civil law does not contravene divine law and canon law does not provide otherwise. This should be considered more than "a mere recognition" of secular law; such secular law "is made into canon law."

Contract law is an area of civil jurisprudence which the 1983 Code "canonizes". If a contract is valid in civil law, it is valid in canon law also. If a contract is rendered invalid by civil law, it is thereby rendered invalid in canon law as well.

Canon 1290: Without prejudice to Can. 1547, whatever the local civil law decrees about contracts, both generally and specifically, and about the voiding of contracts, is to be observed regarding goods which are subject to the power of governance of the Church, and with the same effect, provided that the civil law is not contrary to divine law, and that canon law does not provide otherwise.

Prior to the 1917 Code, canon law required that the Roman law of obligations be observed when ecclesiastical moral persons (termed "juridic persons" in the 1983 Code, except for the Holy See and the Catholic Church as such) entered into contracts. Canon 1529 of the 1917 Code made a shift regarding contract law, recognizing the civil law binding in the particular territory in which a contract was made as binding in canon law as well (with certain exceptions).

The legal capacity of physical and juridic persons to contract comes from canon law itself, however, and not from civil law, even though the provisions of the civil contract law are observed in canon law with the same effects.

Canon law, therefore, cannot be said to have a universal contractual law.

== Roman origins and moralist doctrine ==
The canonical and moralist doctrine on this subject is a development of that contained in the Roman civil law. In Roman law a mere agreement between two parties to give, do, or refrain from doing something was a nude pact (pactum nudum) which gave rise to no civil obligation, and no action lay to enforce it. It needed to be clothed in some investitive fact which the law recognized in order to give rise to a civil obligation which should be enforced at law. Not that the nude pact was considered to be destitute of all binding force; it gave rise to a natural obligation, and it might afford ground for a legal exception. A man of honour would keep his engagements even if he knew that the law could not be invoked to compel him to do so.

Moral theology, being the science of Christian conduct, could not be satisfied with the mere legal view of the effect of an agreement. If the agreement had all other requisites for a valid contract, moral theology must necessarily consider it to be binding, even though it was a nude pact and could not be enforced in the courts of law. Canon law made this moral attitude its own. In the Decretals of Gregory IX it is expressly laid down that pacts, however nude, must be kept, and that a strenuous endeavour must be made to put in execution what one has promised. It thus came to pass that nude pacts could be enforced in the Christian courts, and the Church's legislation served eventually to break down the rigid formalism of Roman law, and to prepare the way for the more equitable law of contract which all Christian nations now possess.

In the canonical and moral doctrine there is hardly room for the distinction between a nude pact, or mere agreement, and a contract. The Roman jurist's definition of the former is frequently used by canonists to define contract. They say that a contract is the consent of two or more persons to the same proposal; or, bringing out a little more definitely the effect and object of a contract, they define it to be an agreement by which two or more persons mutually bind themselves to give, do, or abstain from something.

From the moralist's point of view, then, every agreement seriously entered into by those who are capable of contracting with reference to some lawful object is a contract, whether such agreement can be enforced in the civil courts or not. The intention of the parties is looked at, and if they seriously intended to bind themselves, there is a contractual relation between them.

== Morally-binding force of legally null contracts ==
This doctrine, however, gives rise to a question of some importance. The Church fully admits and defends the right of the State to make laws for the temporal well-being of its citizens. All States require certain formalities for the validity of certain actions. Last wills and testaments are a familiar example, and although they are not strictly contracts, yet the principle is the same and they will serve for an example of what is meant. A deed, the only formal contract of English law, is another example.

A will destitute of the requisite formalities is null and void at law; but what is the effect of such a voiding law in the forum of conscience? This question has been much debated among moralists.

Some have maintained that such a law is binding in the internal as well as in the external forum, so that a formal contract, destitute of the formalities required by law, is null and void in conscience as it is in law.

Others adopted the contrary opinion, and held that the want of formality only affected the external forum of civil law, and left intact the natural obligation arising from a contract.

The common opinion takes a middle course. It holds that the want of formality, though it makes the contract void in the eyes of the law, renders it only voidable in the forum of conscience; so that, until one of the parties moves to set the contract aside, it remains valid, and anyone deriving benefit under it may enjoy his benefit in peace. If, however, the party interested moves to set it aside, and does so effectively by having recourse to the court of law if necessary, both must then abide by the law which makes the contract void and of no effect.
