= Papal rescripts =

Response of the Pope to a query or petition

Papal rescripts are responses of the pope or a Congregation of the Roman Curia, in writing, to queries or petitions of individuals. Some rescripts concern the granting of favours; others the administration of justice under canon law, e. g. the interpretation of a law, the appointment of a judge.

== Types of rescripts ==
Sometimes the favour is actually granted in the rescript (gratis facta—a rescript in forma gratiosa); sometimes another is empowered to concede the request (gratia facienda—a rescript in forma commissoria); sometimes the grant is made under certain conditions to be examined into by the apostolic executor (a rescript in forma mixta).

The petition forwarded to Rome should comprise three parts: the narrative or exposition of the facts (context); the petition (object of the demand); the reasons for the request.

The response likewise contains three parts: a brief exposition of the case; the decision or grant; the reason of the same.

Every rescript pre-supposes the truth of the allegations found in the supplication. Intentional falsehood or concealment of truth (obreption and subreption) renders a rescript invalid, since no one should benefit through his own deceit. According to some, however, a rescript is valid if voluntary misrepresentation affects only the secondary reason of the grant. This is certainly true where there is no fraud, but merely inadvertence or ignorance of requirements; for, where there is no malice, punishment should not be inflicted; and the petition should be granted, if a sufficient cause therefor exists. A rescript in forma commissoria is valid, if the reason alleged for the grant be true at the time of execution, though false when the rescript was issued.

When a rescript is null and void, a new petition is drawn up containing the tenor of the previous concession and cause of nullity, and asking that the defect be remedied. A new rescript is then given, or the former one validated by letters perinde valere.

If the formalities sanctioned by canon law or usage for the drawing up of rescripts are wanting, the document is considered spurious. Erasures, misspellings or grave grammatical errors in a rescript render its authenticity suspected.

Excommunicated persons may seek rescripts only in relation to the cause of their excommunication or in cases of appeal. Consequently, in rescripts absolution from penalties and censures is first given, as far as necessary for the validity of the grant.

Rescripts have the force of a particular law, i. e. only for the persons concerned; only occasionally, e. g., when they interpret or promulgate a general law, are they of universal application.

Rescripts in forma gratiosa are effective from the date they bear; others only from the moment of execution. Rescripts contrary to common law contain a derogatory clause: all things to the contrary notwithstanding. Rescripts of favour ordinarily admit a broad interpretation; the exceptions are when they are injurious to others, refer to the obtaining of ecclesiastical benefices, or are contrary to common law. Rescripts of justice are to be interpreted strictly. Rescripts expire for the most part in the same manner as faculties.
