= Taxa Innocentiana =

Decree of Pope Innocent XI

Taxa Innocentiana was a decree of Pope Innocent XI of 1 October 1678 that regulated the fees that episcopal chancery offices might demand or accept for various acts, instruments, and writings. According to the decree, bishops or their officials were proscribed from accepting anything, though voluntarily offered, for:

- Ordinations or anything connected therewith, e.g., dimissorial letters;
- Institutions to benefices; or
- Matrimonial dispensations.

In the last case, however, alms to be applied for religious uses could be demanded. The chancellor may exact a moderate charge, determined by Innocent XI, for expediting necessary documents, except those granting permission to offer Mass, administer the sacraments, preach, etc. The Taxa Innocentiana was silent regarding contentious matters, e.g. the charge for copies of acts of ecclesiastical trials. Some maintained that Innocent XI's legislation was promulgated only for Italy, but it evidenced the will of the Church and at least in substance was of universal application.

On 10 June 1896 the Sacred Congregation of the Council modified the prescriptions of Innocent XI, decreeing that while taxes or fees may be imposed according to justice and prudence in matters pertaining to benefices and sacraments, especially matrimony; yet the sacraments themselves must be conferred without charge and pious customs connected therewith observed. In other matters not directly affecting the administration of the sacraments, e.g. dispensations from the banns of marriage, it is decreed that:

- Laudable customs must be followed and allowances made for various circumstances of time, place, and persons;
- The indigent are not to be taxed;
- In all cases, the amount demanded must be moderate, so that persons are not deterred thereby from receiving the sacraments;
- Regarding matrimony, the exaction is to be remitted if otherwise there would be danger of concubinage;
- Regarding benefices, the tax must be in proportion to the fruits or income of the benefice in question; and
- All such fees are to be determined not by individual bishops, but by provincial council or at least in a special meeting of the ordinaries of the province for this purpose.

The approbation of the Holy See is required for the fees determined upon. Rome's sanction is given tentatively for 5 years to Italy and for 10 years to other nations.
