= Promulgation (Catholic canon law) =

Publication of a Catholic canon law

In Catholic canon law, promulgation is the publication of a law by which it is made known publicly, and is required by canon law for the law to obtain legal effect. Universal laws are promulgated when they are published in Acta Apostolicae Sedis, and unless specified to the contrary, obtain legal force three months after promulgation. Particular laws are promulgated in various ways but by default take effect one month after promulgation.

== Definition and nature ==
Promulgation is the act by which the legislator manifests to those subject to his jurisdiction the decision that he has made and makes known to them his intention to bind them to the observance of his law.

Without having been promulgated, the canonical law in question has no legal effect, since promulgation is "an essential factor of legislation" and "an absolute condition for the effectiveness of a law".

For as law is a rational precept, no one can be bound to obey it if it have not been sufficiently made known to him. Ignorance takes away the voluntary; and where there is nothing voluntary there can be no fault or punishment.

Promulgation is a "formal and fundamental element" of canon law. For the purposes of canonical jurisprudence, promulgation is equivalent to publication.

Once promulgation takes place, a canonical law acquires its last "essential condition" and takes immediate effect, subject to the vacatio legis imposed by universal law, or by the particular legislator issuing a law (see section below).

The nature of promulgation in its relation to the nature of canon law is a matter of discussion among canonical writers. Some canonists hold that promulgation as such "enters the very essence of the law", while Abbo and Hannan hold what they assert to be "the more probable opinion that promulgation is merely an extrinsic essential condition sine qua non".

== Promulgation in general ==
Derived from the Latin promulgare, meaning to make known, or to post in public, this is the act by which the legislative power makes legislative enactments known to the authorities entrusted with their execution and to the subjects bound to observe them. Philosophically it is a matter of dispute whether promulgation is of the essence of a law. It seems indisputable that the essential element of a law is the will of the legislator, but it is clear that the legislator should make known his will and intention in one way or another. This manifestation is the promulgation of the law, which is not necessarily distinct from the very elaboration of the law, provided that this takes place by external acts-such as the vote of a legislative assembly or by royal sanction. Such is the practice observed in England and Wales and in most of the United States, but, as it was thought too severe, the legislation of various countries requires the promulgation of laws by a special formal act, through which the text of the law is made known to the community, e.g. by publication of this text in an official journal or bulletin of the Government. Previous to this publication the law does not take effect. The promulgation of a law must not be confounded with its publication, the object of the first being to make known the will of the legislator, of the second to spread the knowledge of legislative enactments among subjects bound to observe them.

The Second Vatican Council used the term "promulgated" (Latin: proprio ore promulgavit, "promulgated it with His lips") to speak of Jesus' own proclamation of the Gospel as the source of all saving truth and moral teaching".

== Legal requirements ==
For sufficient promulgation, the law must be published in such a way that it can come to the notice of the community, although it be not brought specially and singly before the notice of individuals.

=== Universal and particular laws ===
A law issued by the Pope (or with his consent in the case of laws issued by an ecumenical council or congregation) is promulgated when it is published in Acta Apostolicae Sedis, and by default has the force of law three calendar months after promulgation.

Pontifical laws and apostolic constitutions begin to oblige, so far as is ex se, the whole world as soon as they have been solemnly promulgated in Rome and come to the knowledge of others. It is not necessary that they should be promulgated in every province or diocese unless such is stated in the laws themselves.

Particular laws, issued by bishops and particular councils, are promulgated in various ways but, unless specified to the contrary, take effect after one calendar month.

=== Vacatio legis ===
In principle, a law becomes binding from the time of its promulgation. But because there are often reasons that the immediate efficacy of a law would be detrimental to those upon whom it enjoins, the legislator often orders a delay, or vacatio, in the law's applicability. In Latin canon law, the vacatio legis is three months for universal laws, and one month for particular laws, unless the law itself establishes a longer or shorter period of time. The legislator of the law can stipulate a longer or shorter time of vacatio than that which is stipulated generally.

=== Computation of time ===
Months are computed according to the calendar from the date of publication. A "canonical month" (in contradistinction to a "calendar month") is a period of 30 days, while a "calendar month" is a continuous month. The vacatio legis is computed according to the calendar; for example, if a law is promulgated on 2 November, and the vacatio legis is 3 months, then the law takes effect on 2 February. So a universal law has a vacatio legis of approximately 90 days—3 months taken according to the calendar—while a particular law has a vacatio legis of approximately 30 days—1 month taken according to the calendar—unless specified to the contrary.

== History ==
According to Canon 7 of the 1983 Code of Canon Law, Lex instituitur cum promulgatur ("A law is instituted when it is promulgated"). This is an ancient provision in Latin-rite canon law, dating in its plural form to the Latin formulation of the great twelfth-century codifier of canon law, Gratian: Leges instituuntur cum promulgantur ("Laws are instituted when they are promulgated"). The exact same formulation found in Gratian's Decretum was reproduced in the 1917 Code of Canon Law, while the Latin plural of the original was modified to its singular form (Leges to Lex, instituuntur to instituitur, and promulgantur to promulgatur).

In previous times laws issued by the Holy See were affixed to the Basilica of St. John Lateran, the Basilica of St. Peter, the Palace of the Apostolic Chancery, and in the Campo dei Fiori. Since the laws had been posted publicly in the city (Urbi), they were deemed to have been promulgated to the world (Orbi). The current method of promulgating universal laws—publishing them in the Acta Apostolicae Sedis—was introduced by Pope Pius X with the apostolic constitution Promulgandi of 29 September 1908, and was confirmed by the 1917 Code.

A recent trend is to promulgate universal laws independently of their publication in the Acta Apostolicæ Sedis, with the Acta remaining the source for their official Latin text. In general, the Holy See does not give its assent to translations of the Latin originals (so-called "'authentic' translations"); the Holy See is content to publish the Latin alone, as Latin is the official language of canon law.

== Promulgation in canon law ==
The Church has long exacted the promulgation of a law by a special act of the authorities: "Leges instituuntur cum promulgantur", a law is not really a law until it has been made known, says Gratian (Decretum Gratiani, pt. I, c. 3, dist. VII). However, no special form is prescribed for acts of ecclesiastical authorities inferior to the pope, even synodal decrees being considered sufficiently promulgated by being read in the synod. The Constitution "Promulgandi" of Pius X (29 September 1908) determined the ordinary method of promulgating pontifical laws, namely by the insertion of the text of the law in the "Acta Apostolica Sedis" (the official publication of the Holy See), after the insertion has been ordered by the secretary or the supreme authority of the congregation or the office through the medium of which the pope has passed the law. A regulation of 5 January 1910, divides the official bulletin of the Holy See into two parts: in the first or official part should be inserted all documents requiring promulgation to have the force of law; the second merely serves to illustrate and supplement the first (Acta Apost. Sedis, 1910, p. 36). However, the pope explicitly reserves the right to determine in exceptional cases another method of promulgation. Prior to this law two systems had been chiefly in use in the Church-provincial promulgation, until the end of the thirteenth century, and Roman promulgation. During the first period promulgation often took place in the different ecclesiastical provinces either through special envoys or through the bishops. Nevertheless, it is also a fact that laws binding in one province were also binding in others. During the second period the custom, which became exclusive during the fifteenth century, developed of having the new laws read and posted up by cursores at Rome only, at the doors of the great basilicas, the Palazzo Cancellaria, the Campo de' fiori, and sometimes at the Capitol. The value of this means of promulgation was disputed in modern times: some claimed that the Church had admitted the arrangements of Novels lxvi and cxvi of Justinian, which required provincial promulgation for some laws; others maintained that in theory publication at Rome was sufficient, but that the popes did not wish to bind the faithful before the laws were made known to them by the bishops; while others appealed to ancient customs, to which the pope should conform. This last theory, made use of by the Gallicans and Febronianists, furnished the State with a pretext for preventing the promulgation of laws which it did not like. A special method of promulgation was also introduced with the express or tacit consent of the Holy See for the decrees of congregations; they were published at the secretariate of the dicasteries from which they emanated.
