= Acta Apostolicae Sedis =

Official gazette of the Holy See

- Type: Monthly official journal
- Publisher: Vatican City
- Founded: 29 September 1908; 117 years ago
- Language: Latin (documents published can be in any language)
- Headquarters: Vatican City
- ISSN: 0001-5199

Acta Apostolicae Sedis (Latin for 'Acts of the Apostolic See'), often cited as AAS, is the official gazette of the Holy See, appearing about twelve times a year. It was established by Pope Pius X on 29 September 1908 with the decree Promulgandi Pontificias Constitutiones, and publication began in January 1909. It contains all the principal decrees, encyclical letters, decisions of Roman congregations, and notices of ecclesiastical appointments. The laws contained in it are to be considered promulgated when published, and effective three months from date of issue, unless a shorter or longer time is specified in the law.

== Acta Sanctæ Sedis ==
Acta Sanctæ Sedis (ASS; Latin for 'Acts of the Holy See') was a Roman monthly publication containing the principal public documents issued by the pope, directly or through the Roman congregations.

It was begun in 1865, under the title of Acta Sanctæ Sedis in compendium redacta etc.. At the time, it was not designated as the official means of promulgating laws of the Holy See, nor as an official publication of the Holy See; the publication of the ASS was purely a private initiative. However, this changed when on 23 May 1904 the ASS was declared an organ of the Holy See by Pius X, to the extent that all documents printed in it were considered "authentic and official"; those dispositions were put in place beginning with vol. 37 of the ASS, in 1904. The Acta Sanctæ Sedis ceased publication in 1908, with its last volume being the 41st.

== Acta Apostolicae Sedis ==
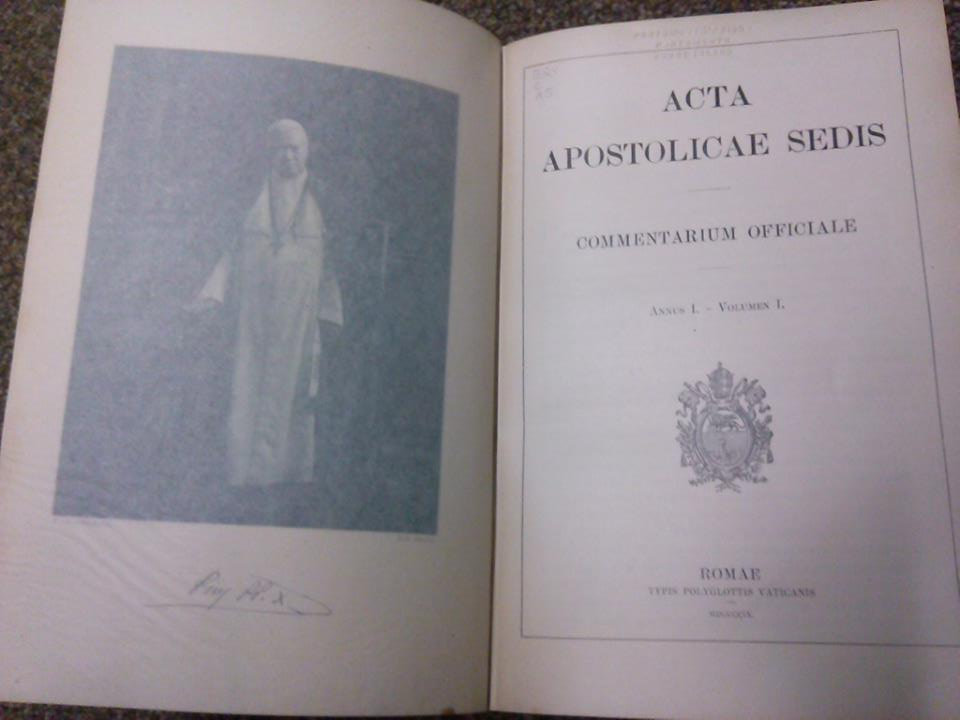
Cover page and leaf of Vol. 1, No. 1 of the Acta Apostolicae Sedis (1909)

On 29 September 1908, Pope Pius X, in the decree Promulgandi Pontificias Constitutiones, replaced the Acta Sanctæ Sedis with the Acta Apostolicae Sedis, to which he gave the status of the official gazette of the Holy See, and which began publication in January 1909. In the new disposition, the documents published in the AAS are considered as authentic and official—like the ones in the ASS since its volume 37—but the novelty is that it is by the publication in the AAS that those documents, unless otherwise stated, are promulgated.

The Acta Apostolicae Sedis is published in Latin, but also contains documents in many different languages.

Since 1929, Acta Apostolicae Sedis can have a supplement in Italian, called Supplemento per le leggi e disposizioni dello Stato della Città del Vaticano, containing laws and regulations of Vatican City, the city-state founded the same year. In accordance with paragraph 2 of the Legge sulle fonti del diritto of 7 June 1929, the laws of the state are promulgated by being included in this supplement.

== See also ==
- Index of Vatican City–related articles
- Fundamental Law of Vatican City State
