= Abstemius =

In Catholicism, a person who cannot consume wine

An abstemius (plural abstemii) is one who cannot take wine without risk of vomiting. Since in Catholic practice the consecration at Mass must be effected in both species, of bread and wine, an abstemius is consequently irregular.

== De jure divino vs. canonical law ==
Alphonsus Liguori, following the opinion of Suarez, teaches that such irregularity is de jure divino (Latin: "of divine law"); and that, therefore, the Pope cannot dispense from it. The term is also applied to one who has a strong distaste for wine, though able to take a small quantity. A distaste of this nature does not constitute irregularity, but a papal dispensation is required, in order to excuse from the use of wine at the purification of the chalice and the ablution of the priest's fingers at the end of a Mass celebrated in the Tridentine Mass. In these cases the use of wine is a canonical law from whose observance the Church has power to dispense. A decree of the Sacred Congregation for the Propagation of the Faith, dated 13 January 1665, grants a dispensation in this sense to missionaries in China, on account of the scarcity of wine; various similar rulings are to be found in the collection of the decrees of the Sacred Congregation of Rites.

== Non-Catholic views ==
Abstention from the use of wine has, occasionally, been declared obligatory by various Christian sects. It was one of the tenets of Gnosticism in the 2nd century. Tatian, the founder of the sect known as the Encratites, forbade the use of wine, and his adherents refused to make use of it even in the Sacrament of the Altar; in its place they used water. These sects, mentioned by St. Irenæus (Adversus haereses, I, xxx), are known as Hydroparastes, Aquarians, and Encratites.

Aabstemii on a somewhat different principle have appeared in more recent times. These are total abstainers, who maintain that the use of stimulants is essentially sinful, and believe that the wine used by Christ and his disciples at the Last Supper was unfermented. They accordingly communicate in the unfermented "juice of the grape."

== Controversy over the reception of both species ==
At the beginning of the Reformation, one of the grievances alleged against the Church was that she did not allow the faithful to communicate under both kinds. "We excuse the Church", so runs the Augsburg Confession, "which has suffered the injustice of only receiving under one kind, not being able to have both; but we do not excuse the authors of this injustice, who maintain that it was right to forbid the administering of the complete Sacrament." How, then, were those to be admitted to the Lord's Table, who were unable to communicate under the species of wine? A decree of the Synod of Poitiers, in 1560, reads: "The Bread of the Lord's Supper shall be administered to those who cannot drink the wine, on condition that they shall declare that they do not abstain out of contempt." Other Protestant synods also lay down the rule that persons unable to take wine shall be admitted to the Lord's Table on condition that they shall at least touch with their lips the cup which holds the species of wine; Jurieu, on the other hand, starting from the principle that Christ has founded the essence of the Eucharist on the two species, held that an abstemius does not receive the Sacrament, because it consists of two parts, and he receives only one. A great controversy ensued among the Protestants themselves on this point. Bossuet held that communion under both kinds could not be of divine obligation, since many would thereby be deprived of the Sacrament owing to a natural weakness.

== See also ==
- Canonical impediment
- Eucharist in the Catholic Church
