= Vacatio legis =

Time between announcement of a law and its entering into force

Vacatio legis (Latin for "absence of law") is a technical term in law which designates the period between the announcement of a legislation and its entering into force.

This concept also exists in the Catholic canon law.

== Civil law ==
In civil law, the vacatio legis is "a period of time between announcement of the legal act and its moment of entry into force". It is also known as "an adaptive period", "an accommodative period", "a temporary or transition stage", "a period of rest" or jokingly as "a legal act's holiday". The period of vacatio legis "begins in the moment, when the legal act is officially announced. That kind of regulation as legal act must have a proper announcement, which means that it must be published in official state journal".

== Catholic canon law ==
In the canon law of the Latin Church, the vacatio legis is three months for universal laws, and one month for particular laws, unless the law itself establishes a longer or shorter period of time. Months are reckoned according to the calendar from the date of publication. The law can stipulate a longer or shorter time of vacatio than that which is stipulated generally.

Stanislaus Woywod says of vacatio legis:

The period of time allowed before a new law after its official promulgation goes into force is known in the terminology of Canon Law as the vacatio legis. Canonists have generally held that for all laws promulgated by the Holy See two months time is granted before in places outside the City of Rome the obligation of observing the law begins. For very remote countries even a longer time has been conceded, in order to let the knowledge of the law become sufficiently disseminated to make its enforcement possible. In more recent times the Holy See has in important laws frequently specified the period of the vacatio legis, as for instance in the case of the decree Ne Tenure which was published about eight months before it was to be enforced. The general principle, however, valid in civil law as well as in Canon Law, is that it is the duty of subjects to keep themselves informed through the ordinary channels of information, as, for instance, official magazines and papers, what laws, amendments, decisions, etc., have been enacted by the authorities. It is not necessary, hence, that the bishop announce to his clergy the laws and regulations passed by the supreme authority of the Church, nor can it be said that this is his duty, though for uniformity of action on part of the clergy of a diocese it is advantageous that the bishop announce to his priests the important new laws with direction to make them known on one and the same day to the people throughout the diocese.

== See also ==
- Coming into force
- Sunset provision
