= Ecclesiastical emancipation =

Legal term in the canon law of the Roman Catholic Church

The canon law of the Roman Catholic Church recognizes various meanings of the term emancipation.

== As release from ecclesiastical obedience ==
One was the release of a pupil of a cathedral school, a domicellaris, from subjection to the authority of the scholasticus, or head of the school. This emancipation took place with certain well-defined ceremonies, known in the old German cathedral schools as Kappengang.

The term emancipation is also applied to the release of a secular ecclesiastic from his diocese, or of a regular cleric from obedience and submission to his former superior, because of election to the episcopate. The petition requesting release from the former condition of service or submission, which the collegiate electoral body, or the newly elected person, must present to the former superior, is called postulatio simplex, in contradistinction to the postulatio sollemnis, or petition to be laid before the pope, in case some canonical impediment prevents the elected person from assuming the episcopal office. The document granting the dismissal from the former relations is called litterae dimissoriae or emancipatoriae.

It is not customary to use the term emancipation for that form of dismissal by which a church is released from parochial jurisdiction, a bishop from subordination to his metropolitan, a monastery or order from the jurisdiction of the bishop, for the purpose of placing such person or body under the ecclesiastical authority next higher in rank, or under the pope himself. This act is universally known as exemption.

== In relation to slavery and Roman law ==
In ancient Rome emancipation was a process of law by which a slave released from the control of his master, or a son liberated from the authority of his father (patria potestas), was declared legally independent. The earliest ecclesiastical employment of this process was in the freeing of slaves.

The Church introduced in place of the elaborate formalities of the emancipatio the simpler form of the manumissio in ecclesiâ, in which a simple statement to that effect by the master before the bishop and the congregation sufficed. The emancipation of a slave was especially necessary as a preliminary to his ordination.

Similarly, the entrance of a son into a religious order, i.e. the taking of solemn vows, or the professio religiosa, carries with it in canon law his emancipation from the legal authority (patria potestas) of the father. No positive law, however, can be quoted on this point, nor does modern civil legislation recognize this consequence of religious profession.

== See also ==
- Canon law
