= Decree (Catholic canon law) =

Order or law made by a superior authority of the Catholic Church

A decree (Latin: decretum, from decerno, 'I judge') is, in a general sense, an order or law made by a superior authority for the direction of others. In the usage of the canon law of the Catholic Church, it has various meanings. Any papal bull, brief, or motu proprio is a decree inasmuch as these documents are legislative acts of the pope. In this sense the term is quite ancient. (Note: Pope Siricius speaks (Ep. i, ad Himer., c. ii) of the decreta generalia of Pope Liberius.) The Roman congregations were formerly empowered to issue decrees in matters which come under their particular jurisdiction, but were forbidden from continuing to do so under Pope Benedict XV in 1917. Each ecclesiastical province, and also each diocese may issue decrees in their periodical synods within their sphere of authority.

Decrees can be distinguished between legislative and executory decrees. A general legislative decree enacts law (lex) and stands on its own, while executory decrees determine the implementation of a legislative act and are dependent upon such for their efficacy.

Executory decrees can further be distinguished between general executory decrees and singular executory decrees. A general executory decree binds all those for whom the original law was made, while a singular executory decree makes a decision or makes provision for the appointment of a specific office. Precepts are a kind of singular executory decree, which bind specific person(s) to do or refrain from some act, especially to observe the law. Singular executory decrees are administrative acts subject to administrative recourse.

== Canon 29 definition ==
Canon 29 of the 1983 Code of Canon Law offers a definition of general legislative decrees:

General decrees, by which a competent legislator makes common provisions for a community capable of receiving a law, are true laws and are regulated by the provisions of the canons on laws.

The canon reproduces substantial elements (later deleted) of the original draft of what would become canon 7. This canon incorporates a definition which takes its inspiration from Thomas Aquinas' definition of human law found in his Treatise on Law.

== Codifications ==
The word is also used to denote certain specified collections of church law, e.g. Gratian's Decree (Decretum Gratiani). In respect of the general legislative acts of the pope there is never doubt as to the universal extent of the obligation; the same may be said of the decrees of a general council, e.g. those of the First Vatican Council.

The Council of Trent was the first to apply the term indiscriminately to rulings concerning faith and discipline (decreta de fide, de reformatione).

== Decrees of Roman curial congregations ==
The Roman congregations were formerly empowered to issue decrees in matters which came under their particular jurisdiction. The decrees of the Roman congregations (q. v.) are certainly binding in each case submitted for judgment. But there are varying opinions as to whether such judgment is to be taken as a rule or general law applying to all similar cases. The common opinion is that when the decisions are enlargements of the law (declaratio extensiva legis) the decisions do not bind except in the particular case for which the decree is made. If, however, the decision is not an enlargement, but merely an explanation of the law (declaratio comprehensiva legis), such decree binds in similar cases.

=== Benedict XV's restriction of curial decrees ===
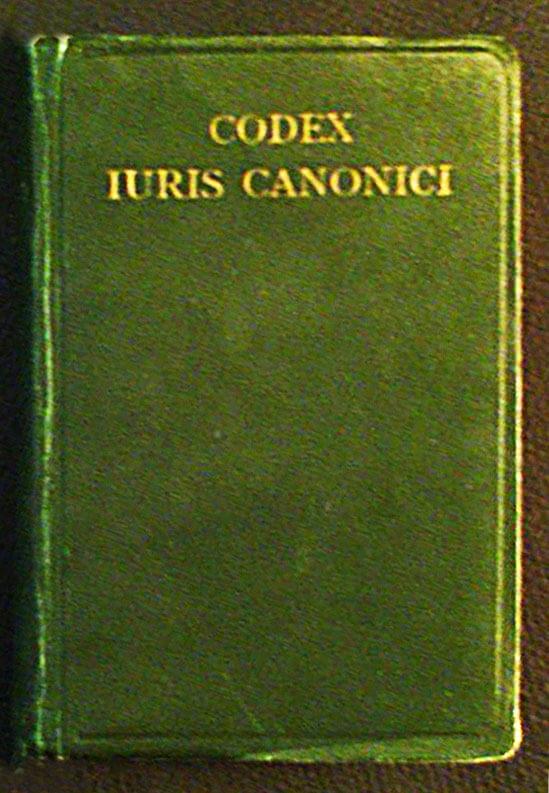
Hardcover of the 1917 Code of Canon Law

On 15 September 1917, by the motu proprio Cum Iuris Canonici, Pope Benedict XV made provision for a pontifical commission charged with interpreting the code and making any necessary modifications as later legislation was issued. New laws would be appended to existing canons in new paragraphs or inserted between canons, repeating the number of the previous canon and adding bis, ter, etc. (e.g. "canon 1567bis" in the style of the civil law) so as not to subvert the ordering of the code, or the existing text of a canon would be completely supplanted. The numbering of the canons was not to be altered.

The Roman congregations were forbidden to issue new general decrees, unless it was necessary, and then only after consulting the pontifical commission charged with amending the code. The congregations were instead to issue instructions on the canons of the code, and to make it clear that they were elucidating particular canons of the code. This was done so as not to make the code obsolete soon after it was promulgated. The 1917 Code was very rarely amended, and then only slightly.

== Particular law ==
The decrees of a national council may not be promulgated until they have received the approval of the pope. The decrees of a provincial synod have no force until they have been approved by Rome. This approval is twofold: ordinary (in formâ communi), and specific (in formâ specificâ). The former means that there is nothing which needs correction in the decrees of the synod, and they thereby have force in the province. This is the approval generally given to such decrees. If approval is given in formâ specificâ the decrees have the same force as if they emanated from the Apostolic See, though they are binding only in the province for which they are made.

The decrees of a diocesan bishop deal with the administration and good order of his diocese. If they are made during a synod, they are diocesan laws, are usually known as "diocesan statutes", or "synodal statutes", and bind until revoked by the bishop or his successor. If the decrees are extra-synodal, they have force only during the lifetime of the bishop or until he revokes them himself.

== See also ==
- Decretum Gelasianum
