= 1917 Code of Canon Law =

1917 codification of Catholic canon law

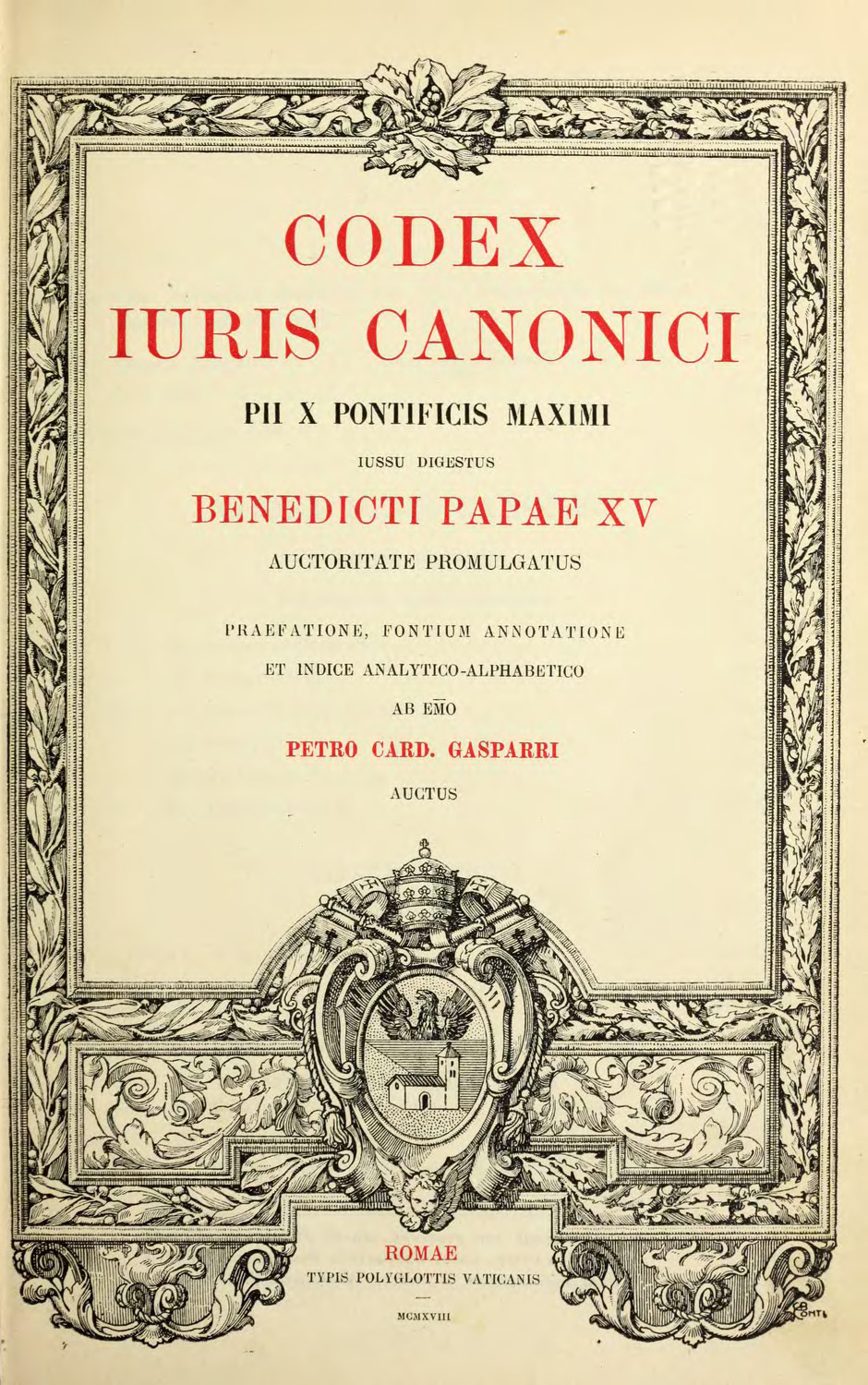
Title page of the 1918 edition of the 1917 CIC

The 1917 Code of Canon Law (abbreviated 1917 CIC, from its Latin title Codex Iuris Canonici), also referred to as the Pio-Benedictine Code, is the first official comprehensive codification of Latin canon law.

Ordered by Pope Pius X in 1904 and carried out by the Commission for the Codification of Canon Law, led by Pietro Cardinal Gasparri, the work to produce the code was completed and promulgated under Pope Benedict XV on 27 May 1917, coming into effect on 19 May 1918. The 1917 Code of Canon Law has been described as "the greatest revolution in canon law since the time of Gratian" (1150s AD).

The 1917 Code of Canon Law was composed of laws called canons, of which there were 2,414. It remained in force until the 1983 Code of Canon Law took legal effect and abrogated it on 27 November 1983.

== History ==
=== Background ===
Papal attempts at codification of the scattered mass of canon law spanned the eight centuries since Gratian produced his Decretum c. 1150. The five books of the Decretales Gregorii IX and the Liber Sextus of Boniface VIII were later published.

=== Reasons for codification ===
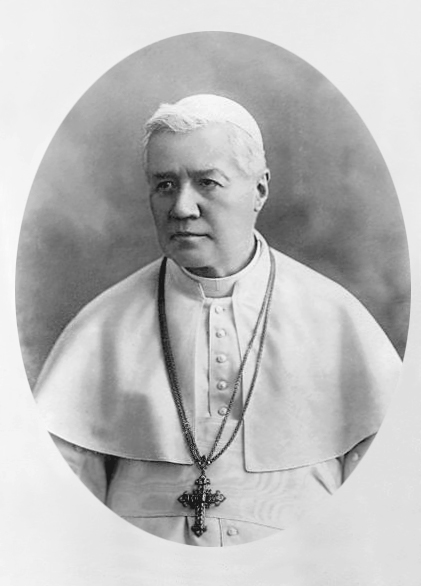
Pope Pius X, who ordered the codification of canon law in 1904

Since the close of the Corpus Juris, numerous new laws and decrees had been issued by popes, councils, and Roman Congregations. No complete collection of them had ever been published and they remained scattered through the ponderous volumes of the Bullaria, the Acta Sanctae Sedis, and other such compilations, which were accessible to only a few and for professional canonists themselves and formed an unwieldy mass of legal material. Moreover, not a few ordinances, whether included in the "Corpus Juris" or of more recent date, appeared to be contradictory; some had been formally abrogated, others had become obsolete by long disuse; others, again, had ceased to be useful or applicable in the present condition of society. Great confusion was thus engendered and correct knowledge of the law rendered very difficult even for those who had to enforce it.

Already in the Council of Trent the wish had been expressed in the name of the King of Portugal that a commission of learned theologians be appointed to make a thorough study of the canonical constitutions binding under pain of mortal sin, define their exact meaning, see whether their obligation should not be restricted in certain cases, and clearly determine how far they were to be maintained and observed.

In response to the request of the bishops at the First Vatican Council, on 14 May 1904, with the motu proprio Arduum sane munus ("A Truly Arduous Task"), Pope Pius X set up a commission to begin reducing these diverse documents into a single code, presenting the normative portion in the form of systematic short canons shorn of the preliminary considerations.

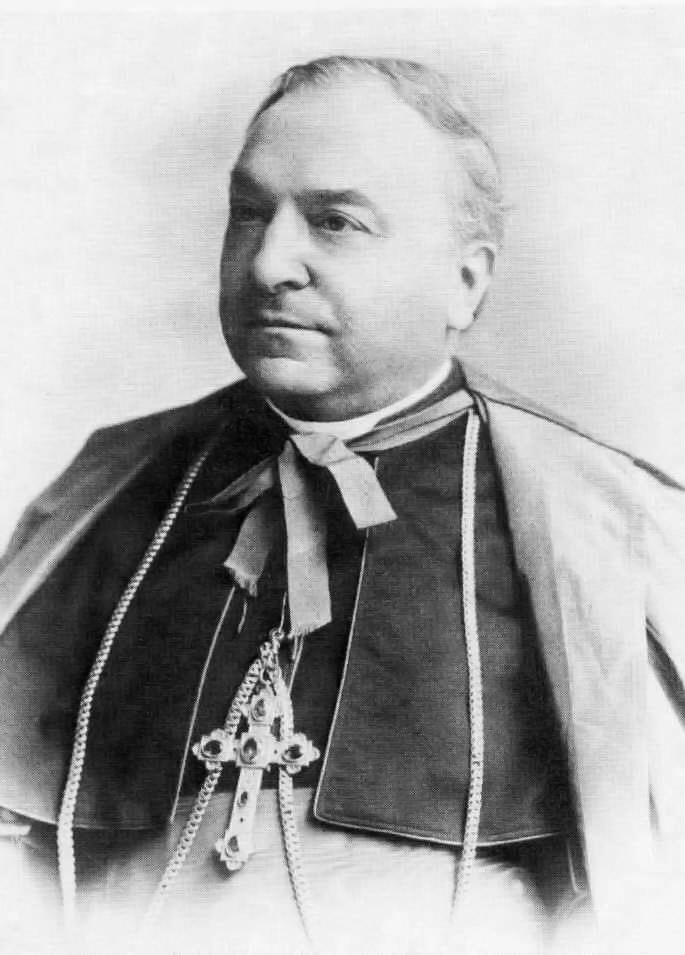
Pietro Cardinal Gasparri, architect of the 1917 Code

=== Codification process ===
In addition to the canon law experts brought to Rome to serve on the codification commission, all the Latin Church's bishops and superiors general of religious orders were periodically consulted via letter. Every Latin bishop had the right to permanently keep a representative in Rome to give him voice at the meetings of the codification commission.

By the winter of 1912, the "whole span of the code" had been completed, so that a provisional text was printed. The 1912 text was sent out to all Latin bishops and superiors general for their comment, and the notations which they sent back to the codification commission were subsequently printed and distributed to all members of the commission, in order that the members might carefully consider the suggestions.

Under the aegis of Cardinal Pietro Gasparri, with the help of Eugenio Pacelli (who later became Pope Pius XII), the Commission for the Codification of Canon Law completed its work under Benedict XV, who promulgated the Code which became effective in 1918. The work having been begun by Pius X and being promulgated by Benedict XV, it is sometimes called the "Pio-Benedictine Code".

=== Period of enforcement ===
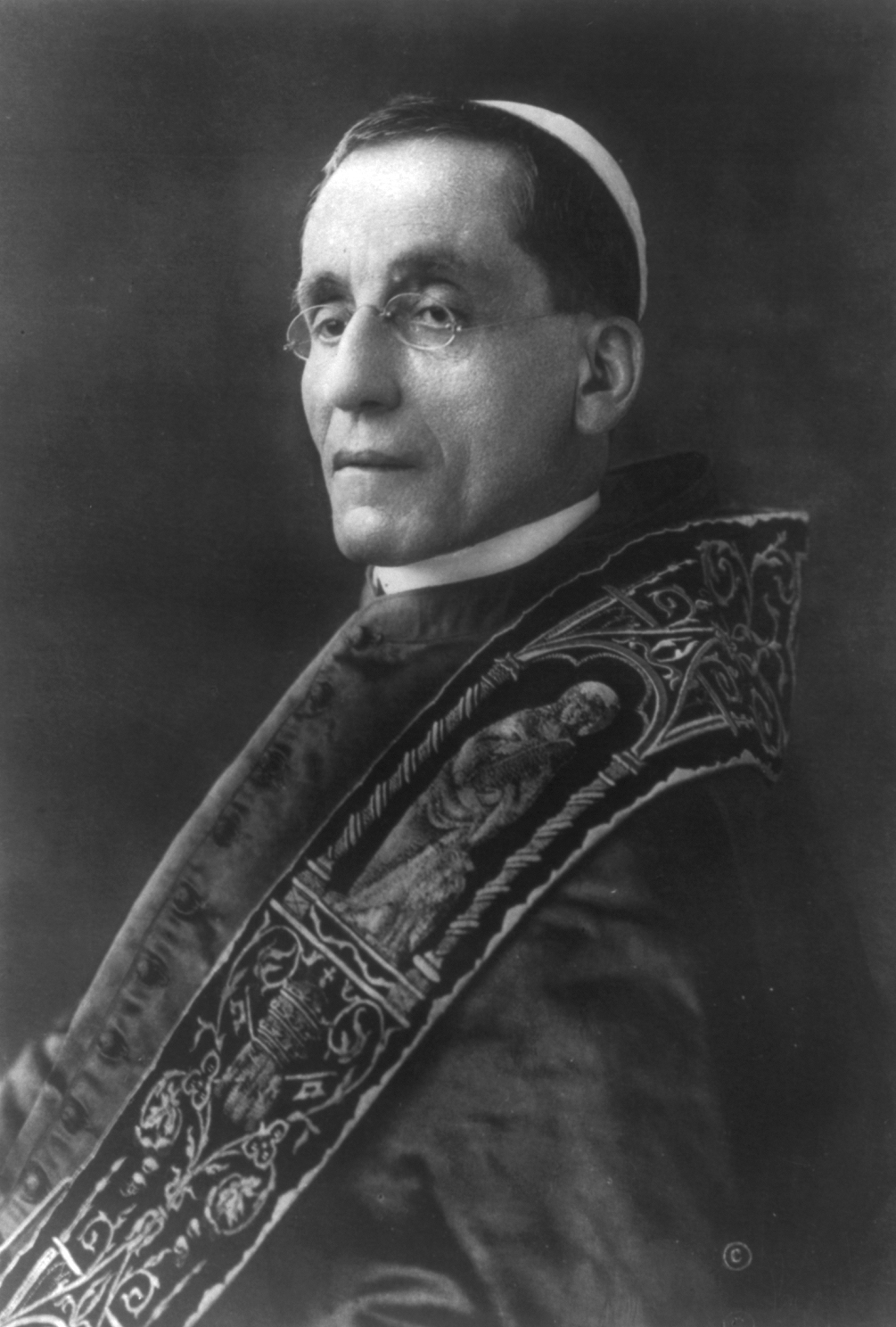
Pope Benedict XV, who promulgated the 1917 Code

The new code was completed in 1916. The code was promulgated on 27 May 1917, Pentecost Sunday, as the Code of Canon Law (Latin: Codex Iuris Canonici) by Pope Benedict XV's apostolic constitution Providentissima Mater Ecclesia. Benedict XV set 19 May 1918 as the date on which it came into force.

On 15 September 1917, by the motu proprio Cum Iuris Canonici, Pope Benedict XV made provision for a Pontifical Commission charged with interpreting the code and making any necessary modifications as later legislation was issued. New laws would be appended to existing canons in new paragraphs or inserted between canons, repeating the number of the previous canon and adding bis, ter, etc. (e.g. "canon 1567bis" in the style of the civil law) so as not to subvert the ordering of the code, or the existing text of a canon would be completely supplanted. The numbering of the canons was not to be altered.

For the most part, it applied only to the Latin Church except when "it treats of things that, by their nature, apply to the Oriental".

The Latin text of the 1917 Code remained unchanged for the first 30 years of its enactment, when Pope Pius XII issued a motu proprio of 1 August 1948 that amended canon 1099 of the code, a revision that took effect on 1 January 1949.

The 1917 Code was in force until canon 6 §1 1° of the 1983 Code of Canon Law took legal effect—thereby abrogating it—on 27 November 1983.

=== Decrees ===
On 15 September 1917, shortly after promulgating the 1917 code, Benedict XV promulgated the motu proprio Cum Iuris Canonici, which forbade the Roman Congregations from issuing new general decrees unless it was necessary to do so, and then only after consulting the Pontifical Commission charged with amending the code. The congregations were instead to issue Instructions on the canons of the code, and to make it clear that they were elucidating particular canons of the code. This was done so as not to make the code obsolete soon after it was promulgated. The 1917 Code was very rarely amended, and then only slightly.

== Structure ==
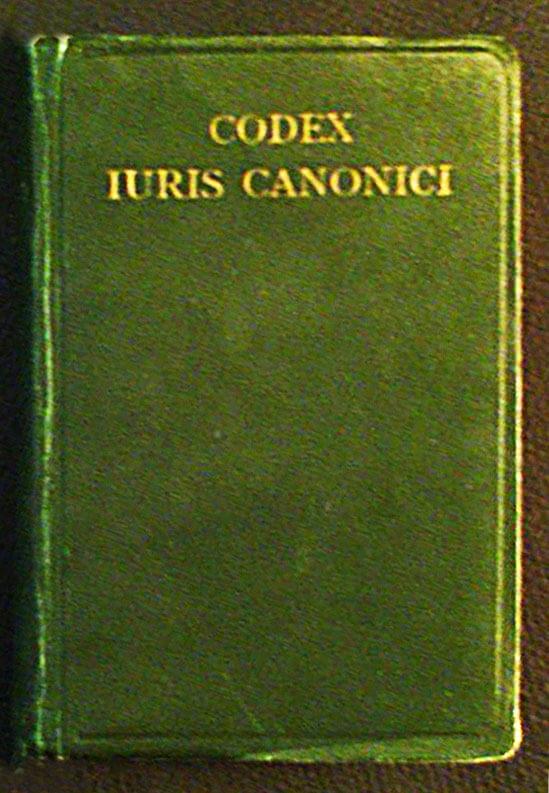
Hardcover of the 1917 Code of Canon Law

The 1917 Code presents canon law in five groupings:

1. the general principles of law
2. the law of persons (clergy, religious, and laity)
3. de rebus (including such "things" as the sacraments, holy places and times, divine worship, the magisterium, benefices, and temporal goods)
4. procedures
5. crimes and punishment

As the first complete collection of law for the Latin church, it paints a fairly accurate picture of the organizational design and the role of the papacy and the Roman curia at the outset of the twentieth century.

The organization of the 1917 Code followed the divisions (Personae, Res, Actiones) of the ancient Roman jurists Gaius and Justinian. The code did not follow the classical canonical divisions (Iudex, Iudicium, Clerus, Sponsalia, Crimen).

== Scholarship and criticism ==
During the 65 years of its enforcement, a complete translation of the 1917 Code from its original Latin was never published. Translations were forbidden, partly to ensure that interpretive disputes among scholars and canonists concerning such a new type of code would be resolved in Latin itself and not in one of the many languages used in scholarship. More English-language research material exists relating to the 1917 Code than in any other language except Latin.

The book De rebus ('On things') was subject to much criticism due to its inclusion of supernatural subjects such as sacraments and divine worship under the category "things" and due to its amalgamation of disparate subject matter. It was argued by some that this was a legalistic reduction of sacramental mystery. René Metz defended the codifiers' decision on the layout and scope of De rebus as being the "least bad solution" to structural problems which the codifiers themselves fully understood.

The Code of Canon Law of 1917 allowed those responsible for the church's financial affairs at the parish and diocesan levels to invest in interest-bearing activities "for the legal rate of interest (unless it is evident that the legal rate is exorbitant), or even for a higher rate, provided that there be a just and proportionate reason."

== See also ==
- Code of Canons of the Eastern Churches
