= Paenitentiale Theodori =

Medieval penitential handbook

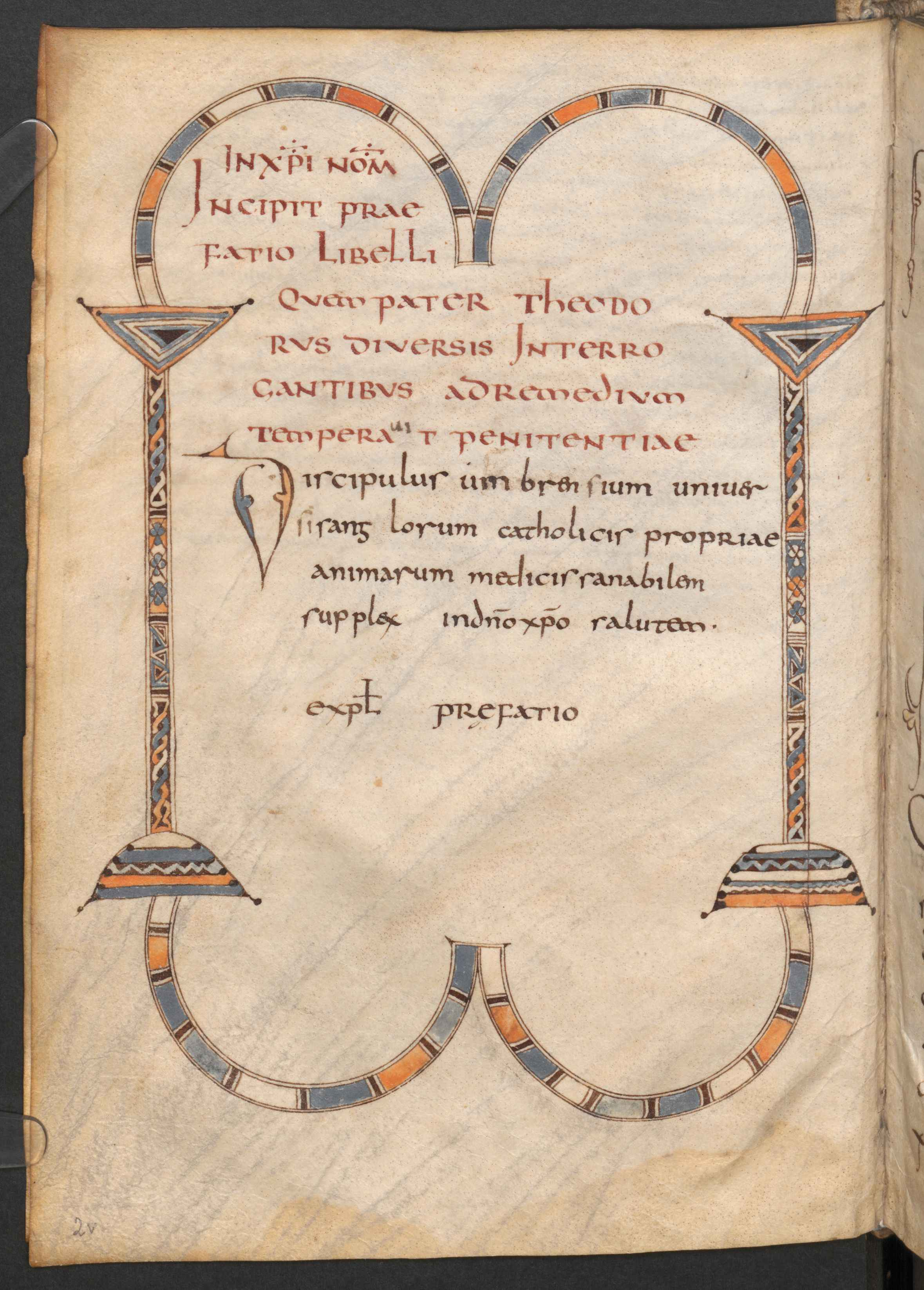
- Folio 2v from the Vienna manuscript, Lat. 2195, showing the decorative title and dedication of the Umbrense version of the Paenitentiale Theodori
- Also known as: Iudicia Theodori, Canones Theodori, Discipulus Umbrensium, Canones Gregorii, Capitula Dacheriana, Canones Cottoniani, Canones Basilienses
- Audience: Catholic clergy
- Language: medieval Latin
- Date: ca. 700
- Genre: penitential, canon law collection
- Subject: ecclesiastical and lay discipline; ecclesiastical and lay penance

The Paenitentiale Theodori (also known as the Iudicia Theodori or Canones Theodori) is an early medieval penitential handbook based on the judgements of Archbishop Theodore of Canterbury. It exists in multiple versions, the fullest and historically most important of which is the U or Discipulus Umbrensium version (hereafter the Paenitentiale Umbrense), composed (probably) in Northumbria within approximately a decade or two after Theodore's death. Other early though far less popular versions are those known today as the Capitula Dacheriana, the Canones Gregorii, the Canones Basilienses, and the Canones Cottoniani, all of which were compiled before the Paenitentiale Umbrense probably in either Ireland and/or England during or shortly after Theodore's lifetime.

== Background ==
It is generally accepted by scholars today that Theodore himself is not responsible for any of the penitential works ascribed to him. Rather, a certain associate of Theodore's named Eoda is generally regarded as the point of dissemination of certain judgements proffered by Theodore in an unofficial context and in response to questions put to him by students at his Canterbury school regarding proper ecclesiastical organization and discipline.

== Authorship and structure ==
=== Capitula Dacheriana ===
Scholars have for some time accepted that the Capitula Dacheriana represents the earliest attempt to assemble together Theodorian penitential judgments. The case for the Capitula Dacheriana as an Irish production has been argued most effectively by Thomas Charles-Edwards, who noticed, first, that the Capitula Dacheriana lacks any obvious structural framework. For Charles-Edwards, this feature (or rather lack of a feature) is symptomatic of the non-Roman character of the Capitula Dacheriana, and thus suggests its creation outside of Theodore's immediate circle, and perhaps even outside of the Rome-oriented Anglo-Saxon church. Whether or not this is true, there are other, strong signs that the Capitula Dacheriana was produced in ecclesiastical circles that had rather less connection to Theodore's Canterbury than with Irish and Celtic centres. Specifically, the Capitula Dacheriana has both textual and literary connections with eighth-century Irish and/or Breton canonical activities.

The Capitula Dacheriana is witnessed today by two tenth-century manuscripts produced in Brittany. Ludwig Bieler has shown that the copyists of both manuscripts derived their text of the Capitula Dacheriana from the same eighth-century collection of Irish materials that was still resident in Brittany in the tenth century — a collection that also included (or was at least closely associated with) the Collectio canonum Hibernensis. The A-recension of the Collectio canonum Hibernensis, believed to have been compiled before 725, is the earliest work known to have drawn on the Paenitentiale Theodori tradition, relying on none other than the Capitula Dacheriana version. From this it appears that the Capitula Dacheriana was assembled perhaps as early as a decade after Theodore's death (in 690), and certainly no later than the first quarter of the eighth century. It was very possibly compiled in Ireland (though possibly instead in an Anglo-Irish or Breton milieux), and was used shortly after its creation as a source for the Collectio canonum Hibernensis, which would itself (even very soon after its creation) go on to influence powerfully the developing canon law and penitential traditions in Francia.

=== Paenitentiale Umbrense ===
The Paenitentiale Umbrense is a selection of canons from the earlier Capitula Dacheriana, Canones Gregorii, Canones Cottoniani and Canones Basilienses, along with additional Theodorian judgments that were obtained by a mysterious figure named Eoda Christianus. As we learn in the preface to the Paenitentiale Umbrense, these latter judgments were proffered by the Archbishop in answer to questions raised by rulings found in a certain "Irish document" (libellus Scottorum), a work that is commonly believed to be the Paenitentiale Cummeani. All of this material has been arranged by the author of the Paenitentiale Umbrense according to topic, with occasional commentary and additional rulings added in by the author of the Paenitentiale Umbrense himself. The Paenitentiale Umbrense is thus far more organized than its predecessors, and — owing to its contents derived from Eoda and the libellus Scottorum — also includes more content that is strictly "penitential" in nature.

The identity of the author is controversial. In the prologue (or rather dedicatory letter) to the Paenitentiale Umbrense the author identifies himself as a discipulus Umbrensium, "a student of the [North]umbrians". Whether this identifies the authors nationality, or merely his academic affiliation, is unclear, and several interpretations of its meaning have been advanced. Felix Liebermann believed that the discipulus was an Irish disciple of Theodore, while Paul Finsterwalder argued that the discipulus was a man, Irish-born though trained in Anglo-Saxon schools, who worked on the Continent, probably within the context of Willibrord's Continental mission. A year after they were published Finsterwalder's conclusions were roundly rejected by Wilhelm Levison, who argued that the Paenitentiale Umbrense was the work of an Anglo-Saxon working in England. Scholars since have generally sided with Levison in viewing the Paenitentiale Umbrense as the product of Anglo-Saxon England, and more specifically of a student working in Northumbria.

The Paenitentiale Umbrense survives in two forms: a Full Form and a Half Form. The Full Form is clearly the more original work, the Half Form being simply the last fourteen topics or chapters or the Full Form. The Full Form itself survives in slightly different versions. In the earliest of these the work is divided into twenty-nine chapters (though the Fulda Recension [discussed below] divides the work slightly differently and into twenty-eight chapters). These are:

- 1: On drunkenness
- 2: On fornication
- 3: On theft (avaritia furtiva)
- 4: On manslaughter
- 5: On heretics (lit. "those deceived by heresy")
- 6: On perjury
- 7: On diverse evils, and on actions that are not culpable because necessary or accidental (quae non nocent necessari)
- 8: On the ways in which clerics can do wrong
- 9: On those who should be laicized, and those who cannot be ordained
- 10: On the twice-baptized and how they may do penance
- 11: On those who do not honor the Lord's day and hold ecclesiastical fasts in contempt
- 12: On Eucharistic communion and the sacrifice
- 13: On the public reconciliation of penitents
- 14: On penance specific to those in Christian marriage
- 15: On the worship of idols and demons
- 16: On church administration and church-building
- 17: On the three principal ecclesiastical grades (i.e. bishops, priests and deacons)
- 18: On ordinations (of bishops, priests, deacons, monks, abbots, abbesses, nuns, virgins, widows, etc.)
- 19: On baptism and confirmation
- 20: On the mass for the dead
- 21: On abbots, monks and the monastery
- 22: On rites performable by women, and on their ministry in the church
- 23: On different customs among Greeks and Romans
- 24: On the communion of the Irish and British, who do not keep Easter or the tonsure according to Catholic custom
- 25: On the mentally ill (lit. "those troubled by a devil")
- 26: On the use and avoidance of animals for food
- 27: On questions pertaining to marriage
- 28: On servants
- 29: On diverse questions

A later version of the Full Form has these twenty-nine chapters divided into two books, with chapters 1–15 comprising the first book and chapters 16–29 (renumbered as cc. 1–14) comprising the second. Up until recently, scholars had assumed that the two-book version of the Full Form was the original version of the Paenitentiale Umbrense. Accordingly all previous editors (Wasserschleben, Haddan–Stubbs and Finsterwalder) have printed the two-book version, and all previous scholarship has been predicated on the assumption that the author of the Paenitentiale Umbrense created a work divided into two books. Several scholars even claim to have detected a generic division between the two books, noting that many of the subjects covered in the first book (drunkenness, fornication, pagan practices, etc.) are those typically associated with the penitential genre, while many of the subjects in the second book (church administration, ordination, baptism) are those typically dealt with in canon law collections. It has been supposed that this is because the author of the Paenitentiale Umbrense wished to divide the chapters of his source material (i.e. the Capitula Dacheriana and the Canones Greogrii) into those of a penitential nature (= Book I) and those of a canonical nature (= Book II). However, it now seems more likely that the more noticeably penitential nature of the first fifteen chapters is due not to the author's specific desire to front-load his work with exclusively penitential material, but rather to his decision to incorporate into pre-existing collections of Theodorian canons (= the Capitula Dacheriana and the Canones Greogrii) the newly acquired canons obtained from Eoda. As described above, the material that the discipulus had managed to obtain (probably indirectly) from Eoda was based largely on Theodore's responses to rulings found in the Paenitentiale Cummeani. All such material from the Paenitentiale Cummeani is indeed found in chapters 2–14 (~ Book I) of the Paenitentiale Umbrense. The highly "penitential" nature of chapters 2–14 is therefore merely an accident of the discipulus’s decision to treat first those subjects touched on by his Eoda/Paenitentiale Cummeani material, namely the traditionally "penitential" subjects of fornication, theft, manslaughter and marriage. Beyond this there was apparently no attempt on the part of the discipulus to treat "penitential" subjects in the first fifteen chapters and "canonical" ones in the last fourteen. Indeed, the last fifteen chapters (= Book II) treats several subjects aligned strongly with the "penitential" genre, for example food avoidance, marital relations and mental illness, while Book I contains chapters dealing with subjects more commonly associated with canon law collections, namely baptism, heresy, and ordination. Neither do the sources used by the author of the Paenitentiale Umbrense give any indication of a generic division between its first and second halves, for a great many canonical sources (i.e. papal decretals and ancient eastern conciliar canons) are drawn upon in the first half.

It now seems that in its original form the Paenitentiale Umbrense was a twenty-nine chapter work and that the two-book version was a later development. The earliest manuscripts — which also happen to transmit the oldest textual variants — witness to a work divided into twenty-nine chapters, while it is only two later manuscripts — which also contain patently more recent textual variants — in which the Paenitentiale Umbrense appears as a work divided into two books. It is also now clear that the passage from the prologue commonly used to defend to idea that the work was originally divided into two works has been misinterpreted. The prologue runs as follows, with the relevant portion in bold:

A student in Northumbria, humbly, to all catholics in England, particularly to the doctors of souls: salutary redemption in Christ the lord. First of all, I have, dear [brothers], held it a worthy enough thing to lay bare to your Love’s blessedness whence I have gathered the poultices of this medicine which follows, lest (as often happens) through copyists’ decrepitude or carelessness that law [lex] should be left hideously confused which God once, in a figurative way, handed down through his first legislator and ultimately to the Fathers [de secundo patribus] in order that they might make it known to their sons, so that the following generation might learn [of it], namely penance, which the lord Jesus, after being baptized, proclaimed to us, having [as yet] no medicine, as above all the substance [prae omnibus ... instrumentum] of his teaching, saying, 'Do you all penance', etc.; who for the increase of your felicity deigned to guide — from the blessed seat of him [eius, i.e. Peter] to whom it is said 'Whichever things you set free upon the land will be set free also in the heavens' — him [eum, i.e. Theodore] by whom this most helpful salve for wounds would be concocted [temperetur]. 'For I', the apostle says, 'have received from the lord'; and I say, dear [brothers]: with the lord's favour I have received from you even that which I have given to you. Accordingly, the greater part of these [remedies] Eoda the priest, of blessed memory, known to some as 'Christianus', is said (by trustworthy report) to have received under instruction from the venerable master [antestite] Theodore. And these are buttressed [In istorum quoque adminiculum est] by what divine grace likewise delivered to our unworthy hands, [namely] things which the aforementioned man came to learn from a widely known Irish booklet, concerning which the elder [senex] is said to have given this opinion: [that] an ecclesiastic [ecclesiasticus homo] was the author of that book. Many others also, not only men but also women, enkindled by him with an inextinguishable passion for these [remedies], in order to slake their thirst hurried with burning desire to crowd round a person of undoubtedly singular knowledge in our age. Whence there has been found among diverse persons that diverse and confused digest of those rules, composed together with established causes of the second book [Unde et illa diversa confusaque degestio regularum illarum constitutis causis libri secundi conscripta inventa est apud diversos]. On account of which, brothers, through him who was crucified and who by the shedding of his blood confirmed what mighty things he had preached while living, I beg your Love's [pacis] most obliging kindness that, if I have herein perpetrated any misdeed of rashness or negligence, in consideration of the utility of this [work] you defend me before him with the merit of your intercessory prayer. I call upon as witness him, the maker of all things, that in so far as I know myself these things [I] have done for the sake of the kingdom about which he preached. And, as I truly fear, if I do something beyond my talents, yet may the good intentions [benevolentia] of so necessary a work [as this] seek from him pardon for my crimes, with you as [my] advocates — for all of whom equally and without jealousy I labor, insofar as I am able. And from all of those things I have been able to select [invenire] the more useful [topics] and compile them together, placing titles before each. For I trust that these things will draw the attention of those of good soul [bono animo], concerning whom it is said ‘Peace upon the land to people of good will'.

The context makes it obvious that the libri secundi highlighted in bold above refers to nothing other than the Scottorum libellus mentioned several times previously. There is thus no need to suppose, and no evidence to support, that the discipulus composed his work in two books.

The two-book version most likely arose under the influence of the canon law collection known as the Collectio canonum vetus Gallica. As mentioned above, the Paenitentiale Umbrense survives in a Full Form, and in a Half Form. So far as can be determined, the Half Form first arose in Corbie between 725 and 750, when the Vetus Gallica collection was undergoing revision and expansion. Those responsible for revising the Vetus Gallica had not long before acquired a copy of the Paenitentiale Umbrense, which they decided to include in their revised collection. For whatever reason, the Corbie revisers were interested only in the final fourteen canons of the Paenitentiale Umbrense, and it was these canons alone that they included in the appendix to the Corbie redaction of the Vetus Gallica. Thus began the tradition of the Half Form version of the Paenitentiale Umbrense. The Corbie redaction of the Vetus Gallica was very successful and very soon after its creation it was enjoying wide circulation in France, Germany, Bavaria and northern Italy. As a result, far more copies of the Half Form version of the Paenitentiale Umbrense were read and copied — either as part of the Vetus Gallica appendix or as part of derivative canon law collections — than ever were of the stand-alone or Full Form version. The two-book version of the Full Form probably only developed after the Half Form had achieved popularity, that is in the second half of the eighth century or first half of the ninth. Since by then most who knew the Paenitentiale Umbrense knew it only in its Half Form version, someone who happened upon the Full Form (which still circulated, though much less widely than the Half) would likely come to believe that that had found a fuller version of the Paenitentiale Umbrense. And of course they would be right. However, so used would they be to viewing the last fourteen chapters as a discrete unit that they would insist on dividing the newly (re)discovered Full Form into two books, with the first fifteen chapters comprising a welcome new (or seemingly new) addition to the Theodorian corpus, and the last fourteen chapters comprising the already familiar Half Form. They would perhaps also have been helped along in their decision to introduce such division by the mention of a libri secuundi in the newly (re)discovered prologue. Future copies of the now-divided Full Form would preserve the two-book format. Centuries later, similar assumptions would be made by nineteenth- and twentieth-century editors, who come to accept as original the two-book format over the twenty-nine chapter format. In 1851 Hermann Wasserschleben would be convinced by the large number of manuscripts containing the Half Form of the Paenitentiale Umbrense, as well as by a single seventeenth century apograph of MS Cb_{4} exhibiting the two-book format, that the work must have originally been composed with two distinct parts; he was therefore persuaded to ignore the evidence of his two earliest manuscripts (W_{7} and W_{9}) and print the Paenitentiale Umbrense with a two-book format. Subsequent editors would base their editions both on the two-book text as established by Wasserschleben and on those manuscripts that were closest or that seemed most ancient to them: these were (for Finsterwalder) MS V_{5} and (for Haddan–Stubbs) MS Cb_{4}, both of which happen to present the Paenitentiale Umbrense in two books. The textual tradition of the Paenitentiale Umbrense has not been studied closely since the work of Finsterwalder, and so the evidence (or rather the lack thereof) for their assumptions about priority of the two-book format have gone unexamined.

Some copies of the Full Form contain a prologue, while others lack the prologue but contain an epilogue instead. No extant copy contains both the prologue and epilogue, a fact that led Finsterwalder to conclude that the epilogue was not original, but was only a later addition intended to replace the prologue. Wilhelm Levison countered this argument by demonstrating that the prologue and epilogue share remarkably similar style, and therefore must have been composed by the same individual. He also pointed out that the prologue is clearly an original part of the Paenitentiale Umbrense because c. 7.5 of the text refers to it directly; and there is also an oblique yet obvious reference to the prologue in the first sentence of the epilogue. The presence of the prologue and epilogue in some witnesses and not in others can be explained without resorting to hypotheses about different authorship or about the priority of one and the posteriority of the other. Of the six witnesses to the Full Form (Cb_{4}, V_{5}, V_{6}, W_{7}, W_{9}, Wz_{2}), all have the prologue except W_{9} and V_{6}. V_{6} is fragmentary and preserves no part of the Paenitentiale Umbrense except the epilogue from eruditis illa onwards, while W_{9} (as Levison suggested) probably once contained the prologue on a folio (now lost) between fols 1v and 2r (i.e. between the capitulatio and beginning of the text) and this folio has since been cut away. (The copies of the prologue in Cb_{4} and Wz_{2} are incomplete: Cb_{4} due to the loss of a folio, Wz_{2} due to abbreviation.) W_{9} and V_{6} are also the only two witnesses to contain the epilogue; yet, in each of the other four witnesses the absence of the epilogue can be explained. Both Wz_{2} and V_{5} are fragmentary at their ends, and so may have once contained the epilogue (it is impossible now to be sure either way); while both Cb_{4} and W_{7} have (as Levison pointed out) simply replaced the prologue with copies of the Libellus responsionum so as to make the latter seem like part of the former. It has recently been argued by Michael Glatthaar that because the epilogue refers disparagingly to certain heretical beliefs associated with two of Boniface's most hated opponents — Adalbert and Clemens — it is most likely a later addition by Boniface or someone in his circle. While the very strong arguments put forward by Levison for the originality of the epilogue render Glatthaar's view of the entire epilogue as a Bonifatian document rather unconvincing, there is no reason that Glatthaar's argument could not apply specifically to those parts of the epilogue that discuss the heretical beliefs of Adalbert and Clemens; such discussions are confined entirely to the second half of the epilogue, which in fact reads more like an epistolary dedication than an epilogue, and so may very well be a Bonifatian addition.

== Manuscripts and transmission ==
There are numerous extant manuscripts that contain the Paenitentiale Theodori or parts thereof. The following tables divide the extant witnesses into Umbrense versions, non-Umbrense versions, and excerpts. Umbrense versions are further divided into Full Form and Half Form. The sigla given below are based on those established by the Körntgen–Kottje Editionsprojekt for the Corpus Christianorum, Series Latina, vol. 156, a project whose goal is to produce scholarly editions for all major early medieval penitentials; sigla in parentheses are those used by Paul W. Finsterwalder in his 1929 edition.

=== Umbrense versions ===
Full Form

Twenty-Nine Chapter Version

Siglum	Manuscript	Contents
V_{6} (Vat)	Vatican, Biblioteca Apostolica Vaticana, Pal. lat. 554, fols 1–4 (written first half of ninth century, probably in Lorsch)	Paenitentiale Umbrense (fragmentary: epilogue only); excerpts from Augustine, Jerome, Pope Gregory I and Basil (on penance, baptism and continence).
W_{7} (V)	Vienna, Österreichische Nationalbibliothek, Cod. Lat. 2195, fols 2v–46 (written end of eighth century in Salzburg)	Paenitentiale Umbrense with preface, prologue and capitulatio but without epilogue (the whole ascribed to 'Pope Saint Gregory' in red uncials on fol. 3r); Libellus responsionum; Paenitentiale Cummeani (preface only)
W_{9} (W)	Vienna, Österreichische Nationalbibliothek, Cod. Lat. 2223 (written beginning of ninth century in the Main river region)	Paenitentiale Umbrense without preface and prologue, but with capitulatio and epilogue [which ends abruptly at inminentes]); Paenitentiale Bedae; Paenitentiale Cummeani (preface, excerpt); Capitula iudiciorum (previously known as the Poenitentiale XXXV capitulorum); Incipiunt capitula scarpsi de iudicio penitentiae beati Gregorii papae (= excerpts from the Libellus responsionum); Libellus responsionum; expositio consanguinitatis ("Auctore mei generis ..."); Fulgentius of Ruspe, Epistula VIII (De fide ad Donatum); Fulgentius of Ruspe, De fide ad Petrum (cc. 47–87); expositiones fidei; Paenitentiale Ecgberhti
Wz_{2} (H)	Würzburg, Universitätsbibliothek, M.p.th.q.32, fols 1–24 (written first half of ninth century in either Würzburg or Fulda)	Paenitentiale Umbrense (palimpsest; fragmentary: capitulatio, abbreviated prologue, and cc. 1–12.3)

Two-Book Version

Siglum	Manuscript	Contents
Cb_{4} (C)	Cambridge, Corpus Christi College, MS 320, fols 117–70 (written second half of tenth century in Canterbury)	Old English exhortations; Paenitentiale Umbrense in two-book form (fragmentary: begins partway through prologue; without capitulatio and epilogue); Libellus responsionum; poem by Archbishop Theodore; note on alms; Paenitentiale Cantabrigiense (a.k.a. Sangermanense); miscellaneous notes
M_{17} (Wi)	Munich, Bayerische Staatsbibliothek, Clm 22288, fols 1–81 (written first half of twelfth century possibly in Bamberg)	Excarpsus Cummeani; Paenitentiale Ecgberhti; unidentified penitential (including: [as Book 1] Paenitentiale Umbrense cc. 1–2.16 and excerpts on penance from [among other things] the Decretum Burchardi, then Paenitentiale Umbrense cc. 10.1–15.2; [as Book 2] Paenitentiale Umbrense cc. 16–25, 27–29 and the Libellus responsionum; and [as Book 3] Paenitentiale Cummeani [preface, cc. (8)9 and (11)12, and epilogue only]); Liber proemium veteris ac novi testamenti; De ortu et obitu patrum; Micrologus de ecclesiasticis observationibus; Admonitio synodalis
V_{5} (Pal)	Vatican, Biblioteca Apostolica Vaticana, Pal. lat. 485, fols 64–113 (written second half of ninth century in Lorsch)	lections, prayers, a Gregorian sacramentary, canonical excerpts, a calendar, a necrology, and tracts on miscellaneous subjects, including weights and measures, confession, and astronomy; Paenitentiale Ecgberhti; Excarpsus Cummeani (excerpts); episcopal capitularies of Theodulf, Gerbald and Waltcaud; Sonderrezension der Vorstufe des Paenitentiale additivum Pseudo-Bedae–Ecgberhti; Paenitentiale Cummeani; Paenitentiale Umbrense in two-book form (fragmentary: preface, prologue, and cc. 1–15)

Half Form

Siglum	Manuscript	Contents
B_{5} (Ha)	Berlin, Staatsbibliothek Preußischer Kulturbesitz, Hamilton 132, fols 1–251 (written beginning of ninth century in Corbie)	Collectio canonum Dionysio-Hadriana (with additions from the Collectio canonum Hispana Gallica Augustodunensis); Collectio canonum Sancti Amandi; Libellus responsionum; Pope Gregory II, Epistula ad Bonifatium (Desiderabilem mihi); Paenitentiale Umbrense cc. 16–29 (lacking 16.1–3 and 25.5–26.9) with c. 13 appended; canons of the council of Rome in 721; the canons of the council of Rome in 595 (Pope Gregory I's Libellus synodicus); Alcuin (?), Epistula contra hereticos (tractate against Adoptionism)
Br_{7} (Ga)	Brussels, Bibliothèque royale Albert 1er, MS 10127–44 (363) (written end of eighth century, possibly in Belgium)	Collectio canonum vetus Gallica; Pope Leo I, Epistula CLXVII (second part: cc. 7–19); Synodus II Patricii; Libellus responsionum; Pope Gregory I, Epistula 9.219 (excerpt); Pope Gregory I, Epistula 9.214 (excerpt); Quattuor synodus principales; Paenitentiale Umbrense cc. 16–29 (lacking 16.1–3 and 25.5) with c. 13 appended; Paenitentiale Remense (fragmentary); Caesarius, Ecce manifestissime; Pope Gregory I, Epistula 9.219; Pope Gregory I, Epistula 9.214 (first part only); the canons of the council of Rome in 595 (Pope Gregory I's Libellus synodicus); the canons of the council of Rome in 721; Ordo librorum qui in ecclesia Romana ponuntur; Computus; De ratione Paschatis; De officiis in noctibus a cena Domini usque in Pascha; De servitio domni episcopi et archidiachoni; antiphonary; Ordo ad infirmum caticuminum faciendum; sacramentary
K_{1} (Col)	Cologne, Erzbischöfliche Diözesan- und Dombibliothek, Cod. 91 (written around 800 in Burgundy)	Collectio canonum vetus Gallica; Pope Leo I, Epistula CLXVII (second part: cc. 7–19); Synodus II Patricii; Libellus responsionum; Pope Gregory I, Epistula 9.219; Pope Gregory I, Epistula 9.214 (first part only); the canons of the council of Rome in 595 (Pope Gregory I's Libellus synodicus); Caesarius, Ecce manifestissime; the Isidorian Epistula ad Massonam; Pope Gregory I, Epistula 9.219 (excerpt); Pope Gregory I, Epistula 9.214 (excerpt); Quattuor synodus principales; Paenitentiale Umbrense cc. 16–29 (lacking 16.1–3 and 25.5), with c. 13 appended; Excarpsus Cummeani
P_{5} (Maz)	Paris, Bibliothèque nationale, Lat. 1454 (written 850×875 in or around Paris [Saint-Denis?])	De canonibus apostolorum seu de sex synodis principalibus ratio libelli primi breviter adnotata; Adnotatio libelli eiusdem synodis aliis XXIIII; Adnotatio eiusdem libelli de decretalibus apostolorum numero XXIIII; Isidore, Etymologiae (excerpt: on canon law); Scimus sciut quidam asserunt statutos esse canones ab apostolis L ... leguntur sub capitulis CCCXXVII; Nominatim scire cupio sex synodi principales ... Georgii Constantinopolitani condemnata heresi anathematizando scripserunt capitula VIIII (= Quattuor synodus principales?); list of Gallic councils; canons concerning Novatianists/Cathars; glossary of words from ancient canons; Osius of Cordova, De observatione disciplinae dominicae; Canones apostolorum; the canons of the council of Nicaea (versio Dionysiana II); the canons of the council of Laodicaea (versio Dionysiana II); the canons of the council of Antioch (versio Dionysiana II); Isidore, Etymologiae (excerpt: on canon law); Constitutum Sylvestri; Collectio canonum Quesnelliana; Differentia inter sacrificium et holocaustum; Pseudo-Silverius, Multis te transgressionibus; Pope Leo I, Epistula CXX; Paenitentiale Umbrense cc. 16–29 (lacking 16.1–3 and 25.5–26.9), with c. 13 appended; a text attributed to Gregorius (Sunt nonnulli qui cultum ... speluncam latronum. Gregorius); Troianus, Epistula ad Eumerium; Caesarius, Ecce manifestissime; Gennadius of Massilia, Liber ecclesiasticorum dogmatum; Scintilla de canonibus vel ordinationibus episcoporum; a collection of Merovingian conciliar canons similar to the Collectio canonum Bellovacensis; Polemius Silvius, Laterculus preceded by Notitia Galliarum; the Isidorian Epistula ad Massonam
P_{6} (Par)	Paris, Bibliothèque nationale, Lat. 1455 (written second half of ninth century in Francia [Reims?])	excerpts from the Collectio canonum Herovalliana, Cresconius's Concordia canonum and Benedictus Levita's Collectio capitularium; Collectio canonum Colbertina; Decretum Gelasianum (cc. 3–5 only); Constitutum Constantini; Collectio canonum Sancti Amandi (expanded and corrected); Libellus responsionum; Pope Gregory II, Epistula ad Bonifatium (Desiderabilem mihi); Paenitentiale Umbrense cc. 16–29 (lacking 16.1–3 and 25.5–26.9), with c. 13 appended; the canons of the council of Rome in 721; the canons of the council of Rome in 595 (Pope Gregory I's Libellus synodicus); Gelasian Sacramentary cc. 35–6; the canons from the councils of Toledo in 646, Braga in 675 and Seville in 590.
P_{7} (m)	Paris, Bibliothèque nationale, Lat. 1458, fols 64–87 (written first half of ninth century in northern France)	Paenitentiale Umbrense cc. 16–29; a collection of Merovingian conciliar canons similar to the Collectio canonum Bellovacensis; † Collectio canonum Quesnelliana
P_{10} (Germ)	Paris, Bibliothèque nationale, Lat. 1603 (written about 800 in northeast Francia)	portion of the St-Amand sacramentary; Admonitio generalis of 789 (c. 81 only); Collectio canonum vetus Gallica; Pope Leo I, Epistula CLXVII (second part: cc. 7–19); Synodus II Patricii; Libellus responsionum; Pope Gregory I, Epistula 9.219 (excerpt); Pope Gregory I, Epistula 9.214 (excerpt); Quattuor synodus principales; Paenitentiale Umbrense cc. 16–29 (lacking 16.1–3), with c. 13 appended; Missa pro deuoto (added by another hand); Paenitentiale Remense; De modis peñ qualitate (Inquisitio seniorum. Sciendum uero est quantum quis ... et de suo labore uel pretio hoc redimat); Caesarius, Ecce manifestissime; Pope Gregory I, Epistula 9.219; Pope Gregory I, Epistula 9.214 (first part only); the Isidorian Epistula ad Massonam; Incipiunt sententias defloratibus diuersis (Homo pro quid dicitur? Resp. Homo dicitur ab humo ... nullatenus sunt recipienda); the canons of the council of Rome in 595 (Pope Gregory I's Libellus synodicus); the canons of the council of Rome in 721; Pirmin, Scarapsus; portion of the St-Amand sacramentary
P_{25} (l)	Paris, Bibliothèque nationale, Lat. 3842A (written middle of ninth century in northern France [Paris?])	as Paris, Bibliothèque nationale, Lat. 1454 (i.e. including the Half Form of the Paenitentiale Umbrense), but without the Epistula ad Massonam
P_{26} (Reg)	Paris, Bibliothèque nationale, Lat. 3846 (written beginning of ninth century in north Francia)	Collectio canonum Dionysio-Hadriana; Collectio canonum Sancti Amandi; (*possibly a different section begins at this point*) Libellus responsionum; Pope Gregory II, Epistula ad Bonifatium (Desiderabilem mihi); Paenitentiale Umbrense cc. 16–29 (lacking 16.1–3 and 25.5–26.9), with c. 13 appended; the canons of the council of Rome in 721; the canons of the council of Rome in 595 (Pope Gregory I's Libellus synodicus)
P_{39} (366)	Paris, Bibliothèque nationale, Lat. 12445 (Sangerm. 366) (written 868×871 in Reims)	Notitia Galliarum; prefatory material from the Decretales pseudo-Isidorianae (A-Class: preface, Ordo de celebrando concilio, Pseudo-Damasus I's Epistula ad Aurelium [Scripta sanctitatis tuae], and Pseudo-Isidorian introduction to the council of Nicaea); series of excerpts on church organization; Pseudo-Isidorian introduction to a Sonderrezension ("special recension") of the Collectio canonum Dionysio-Hadriana; three canons and a glossary (contains several Old High German words); Collectio canonum Dionysio-Hadriana; (*possibly a second section begins at this point*) Decretum Gelasianum; Paenitentiale Umbrense cc. 16–29 (lacking 16.1–3 and 25.5–26.9), with c. 13 appended; Martin of Braga, Capitula; Capitula Angilramni; Collectio Danieliana cc. 131–33 (later additions); (*possibly the third section begins at this point*) excerpts from Pseudo-Isidore and the Collectio canonum Hispana Gallica Augustodunensis (Pope Symmachus's Epistula ad Caesarium [Hortatur nos] and Carthaginian councils [Carthage I to Carthage VI c. 9]); Hincmar of Reims's Ehetraktat (Tractate on Marriage); Collectio Paris lat. 12445 and Berlin Phill. 1741 (including excerpts from Codex Theodosianus book XVI, the Constitutiones Sirmondianae, and the Lex Romana Visigothorum [or the Breviary of Alaric]); Leges novellae (excerpts: Valentinian cc. 27 and 35 = Breviarium cc. 8 and 12); Pope Gelasius I, Epistula ad episcopos Sicilienses (Quomodo praesulum); Augustine, Tractatus in evangelium Iohannis (excerpts: cc. 6.26 and 7.11); Collectio canonum Dacheriana (excerpts: cc. 2. 19–20, 22, 29); Augustine, De adulteriniis coniugiis (excerpts);Letter of Leo of Bourges, Victorius of Le Mans, and Esutachius of Tours (later addition); Hincmar of Reims, Rotula; Pope Gregory I, Epistula 12.10; Pope Hilarus, Epistula ad Leontium, Veranum et Victurum (Movemur ratione); Pope Gregory I, Epistula 9.202 (short form); Pope Hilarus, Epistula ad episcopos quinque provinciarum (Quamquam notitiam); Pope Leo I, Epistula ad Theodorum (‘Sollicitudinis quidem tuae); Pope Gregory I, Epistula 5.8; Pope Gregory I, Epistula 8.14; Pope Gregory I, Epistula 6.11 (conclusion only); Leges novellae (excerpts: Valentinian cc. 8.1 and 8.2); Pope Gelasius I, Epistula ad episcopos Dardaniae (Valde mirati sumus; short form); Pope Felix III, Epistula ad episcopos orientales (Post quingentos annos); the canons of the council of Rome in 595 (Pope Gregory I's Libellus synodicus); Collectio canonum Sancti Amandi (excerpts); Hincmar of Reims's Ehetraktat (Tractate on Marriage; third part only); canons from the council of Rome in 826 (cc. 13–15, 19–20 and 29); Leges novellae (excerpt: Valentinian c. 35 = Breviarium c. 12); Pope Gelasius I, Epistula ad Anastasium augustum (Famuli vestrae pietatis); Ambrose, Expositio de psalmo 118 (excerpts: cc. 8.25–30); Pope Celestine I, Epistula ad Nestorium (Aliquantis diebus); canons from the council of Rome in 853 (cc. 13–15, 18–23); Epitome Iuliani cc. 104 (366) and 119.6 (511); Pope Gregory I, Epistula 7.36
St_{2} (Stu)	Stuttgart, Württembergische Landesbibliothek, HB. VI. 109 (written first quarter of ninth century in southwest Germany)	Collectio canonum vetus Gallica; Pope Leo I, Epistula CLXVII (second part: cc. 7–19); Synodus II Patricii; Libellus responsionum; Pope Gregory I, Epistula 9.219 (excerpt); Pope Gregory I, Epistula 9.214 (excerpt); Quattuor synodus principales; Paenitentiale Umbrense cc. 16–29 (fragmentary: lacking 16.1–3 [? and 25.5]) with c. 13 appended; Fructuosus, Regula c. 16 (second part only) (later addition); Latin and Old High German glosses on words from conciliar canons (later addition)
St_{3} (Stutt)	Stuttgart, Württembergische Landesbibliothek, HB. VI. 112, fols 1–124 (written in second half of tenth century in Lake Constance region)	canons from the Capitulare Wormatiense of 829 cc. 1–4 (later addition); Apostles’ creed; Collectio canonum vetus Gallica (up to c. 64.23, and including as part of the text: Caesarius's Ecce manifestissime, Pope Gregory I's Epistula 9.219 and first part of Epistula 9.214, along with 78 additional canons); the canons of the council of Nicaea (versio Attici); Hrabanus Maurus, Poenitentiale ad Heribaldum c. 10 (later addition); a small selection of canons possibly deriving from Regino of Prüm's Libri duo de synodalibus causis; mixed form of the Paenitentiale Remense and the Excarpsus Cummeani; the Isidorian Epistula ad Massonam; the canons of the council of Rome in 595 (Pope Gregory I's Libellus synodicus); Synodus II Patricii; Libellus responsionum; the canons of the council of Rome in 721; Collectio canonum vetus Gallica cc. 64.24–30; Poenitentiale ad Heribaldum c. 20 (excerpt); Pope Leo I, Epistula CLXVII (second part: cc. 7–19); Paenitentiale Umbrense cc. 16–29 (fragmentary: beginning partway through 16.10) with c. 13 appended; a small selection of canons; Ansegis, Collectio capitularium; Lex Alamannorum (B) cc. 6.1-4 and 8.1–2; canons from the Capitulare Wormatiense of 829 cc. 1–4 and 6 (later addition)
Sg_{1} (S)	St Gallen, Stiftsbibliothek, Cod. 150, pp. 323–84 (written between 820 and 840 in St. Gallen)	Paenitentiale Sangallense tripartitum (including excerpts from first half of Paenitentiale Umbrense); Ordo Romanus VII (incomplete); Paenitentiale Umbrense cc. 16–29 (incomplete: begins partway through 27.11, and continues to end [29.14]), with c. 13 appended; Paenitentiale Sangallense simplex; Paenitentiale Vinniani; Pseudo-Augustine, Sermo ad fratres in eremo
Vs_{1}	Vesoul, Bibliothèque municipale, MS 79 (73) (written around 1000 in France)	a penitential combining the Half Form of the Paenitentiale Umbrense and Excarpsus Cummeani; Paenitentiale additivum Pseudo-Bedae–Ecgberhti;Libellus responsionum c. 9; Institutio canonum (in 91 chapters); Decretum Compendiense from 757 (cc. 1–4); Decretum Vermeriense from 756 (cc. 1–2); tractate on baptism; commentary by Venantius Fortunatus on the creed; commentaries on the mass and the Pater noster; commentary on the creed; Theodulf, Capitulare I; canonical and patristic excerpts

=== Non-Umbrense versions ===
Siglum	Manuscript	Contents
Ba_{2}	Basel, Universitätsbibliothek, N. I 1 no. 3c (written around 800 in Fulda)	Canones Basilienses
Le_{1}	Leiden, Bibliotheek der Rijksuniversiteit, Vulc. 108/12 (written ninth or tenth century in northeastern Francia)	Paenitentiale Ecgberhti (fragmentary: prologue + cc. 4.8–5.1); fragments of an unidentified penitential (including the Edictio Bonifatii); Canones Basilienses (fragmentary: cc. 1–4a)
L_{11} (Co)	London, British Library, Cotton Vespasian D. XV, fols 68–101 (written middle of tenth century in England)	among other things the Canones Cottoniani
Mc_{1}	Monte Cassino, Archivio e Biblioteca dell’Abbazia, Cod. 372 (ext. 372 et 340; int. 553) (written beginning of eleventh century at St Nicola della Cicogna)	Canones Gregorii; xxxxxxxxxxxxx
M_{14} (E)	Munich, Bayerische Staatsbibliothek, Clm 14780, fols 1–53 (written end of eighth century in France)	Canones Gregorii; Libellus responsionum; canons of the council of Rome in 743; ordo librorum veteris et novi testamenti; commutations
O_{2}	Oxford, Bodleian Library, Bodley 311 (2122), (written second half of tenth century in north or northeastern Francia)	capitulationes for the Canones Gregorii (213 titles) and the Libellus responsionum (18 titles); Canones Gregorii; Libellus responsionum; Poenitentiale 223 capitulorum (including: Paenitentiale Cummeani; Paenitentiale Remense [excerpts]; Paenitentiale Umbrense [excerpt: 20.1–4 and 20.6–10 only]; Paenitentiale Oxoniense I); Pseudo-Jerome, Epistula 12 c. 6 (ad Damasum papam; ‘'De septem ordinibus ecclesiae’'); Paenitentiale Oxoniense II
P_{12} (Par)	Paris, Bibliothèque nationale, Lat. 2123 (written around 815 in Flavigny)	canons from the council of Ephesus (cc. 1–4 only; versio Isidoriana); canons of the Lateran council of 649 (incomplete); Gennadius of Massilia, Liber ecclesiasticorum dogmatum; Pseudo-Augustine, Sermones de Symbolo; Pope Leo I, Epistula CLXV (testimonia only); Liber pontificalis (abridged); Polemius Silvius, Laterculus followed by Notitia Galliarum; Canones Gregorii; Collectio canonum Herovalliana (large excerpt); a canon from the council of Carthage in 418 (c. 1 only); chronology of the ages of the world, up to Charlemagne; Marculfus, Formulae; Isidore, Etymologiae (excerpts)
P_{22} (B)	Paris, Bibliothèque nationale, Lat. 3182 (written second half of tenth century, probably in Brittany)	A collection of chapters (mostly canonical and penitential) entitled "Incipiunt uerba pauca tam de episcopo quam de presbitero aut de omnibus ecclesię gradibus et de regibus et de mundo et terra", more commonly known as the Collectio canonum Fiscani or the Fécamp collection. The contents are as follows: Liber ex lege Moysi; notes on chronology; a brief note on Bishop Narcissus of Jerusalem (Narcisus Hierosolimorum episcopus qui fecit oleum de aqua ... orbaretur et euenit illis ut iurauerunt); Incipiunt remissiones peccatorum quas sanctus in collatione sua Penuffius per sanctas construxit scripturas (= large excerpt from Cassian’s Collationes c. 20.8); more notes on chronology; Pastor Hermae cc. 4.1.4–4.4.2 (versio Palatina); scriptural excerpts on chastity, marriage and the oaths of one's wife; Incipiunt uirtutes quas Dominus omni die fecit (chapters on Sunday, the days of Creation, and the Last Judgment); Collectio canonum Hibernensis cc 1.22.b–c (on the murder of priests, and bishops' duty to persist in their own dioceses); Collectio canonum Hibernensis (A version, complete copy); Excerpta de libris Romanorum et Francorum (a.k.a. Canones Wallici); Canones Adomnani (cc. 1–7 only), with an extra chapter appended (Equus aut pecus si percusserit ... in agro suo non reditur pro eo); (*Bieler's section II begins*) Capitula Dacheriana; Canones Adomnani (complete copy); Incipiunt canones Anircani concilii episcoporum XXIIII de libro III (a small collection of canones from the council of Ancyra in modified versio Dionysiana II form); Incipiunt iudicia conpendia de libro III (a small collection of canons including a canon from the council of Neocaesarea [in modified versio Dionysiana II form] and excerpts from the Paenitentiale Vinniani); Canones Hibernenses II (on commutations), with Synodus Luci Victorie cc. 7–9 appended (*Bieler's section II ends*); Isidore, Etymologiae (excerpts on consanguinity); commentary on the Book of Numbers (on oaths); Isidore, Etymologiae (excerpts on consanguinity and heirs); Institutio ęclesiasticae auctoritatis, qua hi qui proueniendi sunt ad sacerdotium, profiteri debent se obseruaturos, et si ab his postea deuiauerint canonica auctoritate plectentur (excerpts on ordination); Collectio canonum Dionysio-Hadriana (ending with canons of the council of Rome in 721); Quattuor synodus principales; Isidore, Etymologiae (excerpts on the ancient councils); Hii sunt subterscripti heretici contra quos factae sunt istę synodi: Arrius ... Purus, Stephanus; De ieiunio IIII temporum anni (In mense Martio ... nulli presbiterorum liceat uirginem consecrare); Libellus responsionum; Pope Gregory I, Epistula 9.219 (excerpt); Pope Gregory I, Epistula 9.214 (excerpt); De decimis et primogenitis et primitiuis in lege (excerpts on tithes); Canones Hibernenses III (on tithes); Paenitentiale Gildae; Synodus Aquilonis Britanniae; Synodus Luci Victoriae; Ex libro Davidis; Capitula Dacheriana (c. 21 [first part] only); Canones Adomnani (cc. 19–20 only); Capitula Dacheriana (cc. 21 [second part, with si mortui inueniantur uel in rebus strangulati appended] and 168 only); excerpts from St Paul (on food); excerpts on hours and the order of prayer; De pęnitentia infirmorum (Paenitentiale Cummeani c. [8]9.28 + Paenitentiale Columbani A c. 1 [first part]); De recitentibus aliorum peccata (Paenitentiale Cummeani c. [8]9.19); De oratione facienda etiam pro peccatoribus (Scriptura dicit in commoratione mortuorum: etiam si peccavit, tamen patrem ... dum angeli Dei faciunt); Paenitentiale Bigotianum; Theodulf, Capitulare I ("Kurzfassung"); Isidore, De ecclesiasticis officiis (excerpt: De officiis ad fidem venientium primo de symbolo apostolico quo inbuuntur competentes, with commentary on Deuteronomy 22–3 appended); Canones Hibernenses IV; excerpts on marriage (mainly from Augustine and Jerome, but also including Synodus II Patricii c. 28); excerpts on kings; excerpts on sons and their debts; Collectio canonum Hibernensis c. 38.17; Patricius dicit (= Canones Hibernenses IV c. 9), Item synodus Hibernensis (= Canones Hibernenses IV c. 1–8); De iectione ęclesie graduum ab ospicio (= Canones Hibernenses V); chapters from Exodus and Deuteronomy (excerpts on virgins and adulterers); on the ordo missae (excerpt from Isidore's De ecclesiasticis officiis); Liber pontificalis (Linus natione italus ... Bonifacius LXVIII natione romanus hic qui obtinuit ... se omnium eclesiarum scribebat); De duodecim sacrificiis (excerpt from Pseudo-Jerome's Disputatio de sollempnitatibus paschae); the ten commandments (Decim precepta legis in prima tabula ... rem proximi tui mundi cupiditatem); excerpts on hours and song (including Pro quibus uirtutibus cantatur omnis cursus, De pullorum cantu, De matudinis, etc.); a brief tract explaining the reason for the flood; De eo quod non nocet ministerium ministrantis sacerdotis contagium uitę (= Collectio canonum Hibernensis [B version] c. 2.12); Canones Hibernenses VI; Capitulare legibus addenda a. 803; Lex Salica emendata; two forged letters purporting to represent a discussion between Pope Gregory I and Bishop Felix of Messina (on consanguinity, the Anglo-Saxons, and the nature of the Pope's Libellus responsionum); Theodulf, Capitulare I (fragmentary); Paenitentiale Ecgberhti (fragmentary: beginning partway through c. 2); Pseudo-Jerome, De duodecim triduanis
P_{27} (A)	Paris, Bibliothèque nationale, Lat. 3848B (written end of eighth or beginning of ninth century in Flavigny)	Canones Gregorii; Ex opusculis sancti Augustini et sancti Ysidoru de diuersis heresibus (Quidam heredici ex nominibus suorum auctorum ... tamen heredicus appellari potest); Gennadius of Massilia, Liber ecclesiasticorum dogmatum; Pseudo-Augustine, Sermo 242 (de symbolo); Pseudo-Augustine, Sermo 244 (expositio fidei); Pope Leo I, Epistula CLXV (testimonia only); Pope Leo I, Epistula XXVIII (= Tomus Leonis); Cyril, Epistula ad Nestorium; Cyril, Epistula ad Iohannem episcopum Antiochiae; excerpts from the acta of the council of Chalcedon; De fide trinitatis (excerpts from the Insular Liber de ordine creaturarum and Isidorian's De differentiis rerum); Collectio canonum Herovalliana; chapters on heretics ascribed to Augustine and Isidore; an excerpt from Rufinus's translation of Eusebius's Historia ecclesiastica (on the council of Nicaea); Gennadius of Massilia, Liber ecclesiasticorum dogmatum
P_{36} (Sg)	Paris, Bibliothèque nationale, Lat. 12021 (Sangerm. 121), fols 33r–356 (written third quarter of the ninth century in Brittany)	Collectio canonum Hibernensis; Capitula Dacheriana; Canones Adomnani (complete copy); excerpts from the councils of Ancyra and Neocaesarea and also from the Paenitentiale Vinniani (as in P_{22}); Canones Hibernenses II (on commutations), with Synodus Luci Victorie cc. 7–9 appended; excerpts from Isidore's Etymologiae on consanguinity and relatives; excerpts from Cresconius's Concordia canonum; Collectio canonum Dionysio-Hadriana; *****
Pr_{1}	Prague, Knihovna metropolitní kapituly, O. 83 (1668), fols 131–45 (written second half of eighth century in either Bavaria or northern Italy)	Canones Gregorii (fragmentary: cc. 174–end); Libellus responsionum (fragmentary)

=== Excerpts ===
Note that reports of the presence of Paenitentiale Umbrense and/or Canones Gregorii excerpts in the tenth-century Collectio 77 capitulorum as found in Heiligenkreuz, Stiftsbibliothek, MS 217 and Munich, Bayerische Staatsbibliothek, Clm 3853 are in error. What such reports are actually referring to is the penitential known as the Capitula iudiciorum (previously known as the Poenitentiale XXXV capitulorum).

Siglum	Manuscript	Contents
K_{5} (Kol)	Cologne, Erzbischöfliche Diözesan- und Dombibliothek, Cod. 210 (written second half of eighth century in northeast Francia, possible the region around Cambrai)	a "truncated" and interpolated A version of the Collectio canonum Hibernensis; a systematically arranged penitential known as the Collectio 2 librorum (including [in the second book only] extensive excerpts from the Full Form of the Paenitentiale Umbrense)
Kw_{1}	Kynžvart, Zámecká Knihovna, 75 (20 K 20), fols 1–78 (written first half of twelfth century in [Saint Blaise Abbey])	Quotienscumque instruction; Decretum Burchardi (excerpts on commutations); Paenitentiale Pseudo-Romanum (= Book VI of Halitgar's Paenitentiale); Hrabanus Maurus, Poenitentiale ad Heribaldum (Sonderrezension); Canones Gregorii though here ascribed to Theodore (cc. 1–8, 12–16, 21–5, and 29–31); Capitula iudiciorum (previously known as the Poenitentiale XXXV capitulorum); an unidentified penitential canon law collection (in 58 chapters); Regino of Prüm, Libri duo de synodalibus causis (excerpts)
L_{1} (L)	London, British Library, Add. 8873 (written first half of twelfth century in Italy)	Collectio canonum Britannica xxxxxxxxxxxxx
L_{2}	London, British Library, Add. 16413 (written beginning of eleventh century in southern Italy)	two unique fragments of the council of Rome in 769; Pseudo-Damasus, Epistula ad Hieronymum de hora sacrificii (JK †246) (excerpt); Admonitio generalis of 789 (cc. 81 and 78 only); Pseudo-Clement I, Epistula ad Iacobum (JK †11) (with some possibly unique additions); canons of the council of Rome in 721 (cc. 1–12 only); several conciliar canons and excerpts from decretals and patristic texts concerning clerical offices; ordo missae; prologue to a sacramentary; chapters from Augustine; Edictio Bonifatii (from the Paenitentiale mixtum Pseudo-Bedae–Ecgberhti ?); De consolatione Origenis defunctorum; De his qui vexantur et seipso interficitunt (= Paenitentiale Umbrense cc. 25.1–2); expositiones fidei; expositio symboli; commentary on clerical grades; expositio baptismatis; liturgica; Sermo de paenitentia; Quotienscumque instruction; Paenitentiale Remenese (? Redemptionstexte); Paenitentiale Cummeani (prologue only); a penitential in 38 chapters (including: [as cc. 1–35] the Capitula iudiciorum [previously known as the Poenitentiale XXXV capitulorum]; and [as cc. 36–8] Iudicium Gregorii de penitentia ad Augustinum [= excerpts from the Libellus responsionum]); Libellus responsionum (incorporating as its third question c. I.20 of Julianus Pomerius’s De vita contemplativa; Julianus Pomerius, De vita contemplativa (c. I.21); Pope Celestine I, Epistula ad universos episcopos per Apuliam et Calabriam constitutos (JK 371) (c. 1 only); Epitome Hispana (excerpts); Canones Gregorii though here ascribed to Theodore (cc. 30, 41–2, 61, 70–1, 72 [first part], 75–6, 77 [partial], 130 [partial] 134, and 159); Collectio canonum vetus Gallica (excerpts); sermons; Pope Gregory I, Epistula ad Secundinum (beginning only, with interpolation De reparatione lapsi); statutes from a south Italian council
Me_{1} (M)	Merseburg, Dombibliothek, MS 103 (written first half of ninth century in northern Italy)	xxxxxxxxxxxxx
Mc_{3}	Monte Cassino, Archivio e Biblioteca dell’Abbazia, Cod. 554 (ext. 554, 508) (written second half of tenth century in Italy)	xxxxxxxxxxxxx; Canones Gregorii (excerpts); xxxxxxxx
M_{2} (Aug)	Munich, Bayerische Staatsbibliothek, Clm 3852, fols 54–end (written eleventh century in southern Germany)	xxxxxxxxxxxxx
M_{6} (Fris)	Munich, Bayerische Staatsbibliothek, Clm 6241 (written end of tenth century in Freising)	fols 33v–35r contain a series of canons ascribed to Theodore and based on the Canones Gregorii
–	Munich, Bayerische Staatsbibliothek, Clm 6245 (written second half of the tenth century in Freising)	Canones Gregorii cc. 1–4 (here ascribed to sancti Gregorii, though this ascription later corrected to sancti Theodori), as the last in a short series of canons added to fols 1r–2v by an early eleventh-century hand
–	Munich, Bayerische Staatsbibliothek, Clm 14468 (written 821 in Regensburg)	xxxxxx; Paenitential Umbrense cc. 5.3 and 14.4 (though possibly instead Canones Gregorii cc. 48a and 68); xxxxxxxxxxxxx
–	Munich, Bayerische Staatsbibliothek, Clm 21587 (written between about 1025–1035 in Freising)	the second volume of the pontifical of Bishop Egilbert of Freising (contains on fol. 20r–v Canones Gregorii cc. 1–4, here ascribed to Theodore)
O_{2}*	Oxford, Bodleian Library, Bodley 311 (2122), (written tenth century in north or northeastern Francia)	as in the table above (i.e. including excerpts from the Paenitentiale Umbrense (either Full or Half Form)
–	Paris, Bibliothèque nationale, Lat. 13658 (written twelfth century in Saint-Germain-des-Près)	Collectio of Paris lat. 13658 (including "capitulum XXVII" of the Paenitentiale Umbrense, which is introduced by a rubric borrowed from the Umbrense preface)
P_{46}	Paris, Bibliothèque nationale, nouv. acq. lat. 281, fols 92–4, 99–101, 110, 119 (written ca. 1000 in either northern Italy or southern Francia)	John Cassian, Collationes 5.2 and 5.16; Paenitentiale Columbani B (prologue only); Quotienscumque instruction; Paenitentiale Oxoniense II (first part of prologue only); Capitula iudiciorum (fragmentary); Canones Gregorii (cc. 4–12, 14–21, 23–28); tractate on penance (beginning: "Penitentiae modus non unus esse debet")
P_{22}*	Paris, Bibliothèque nationale, Lat. 3182 (written second half of tenth century, probably in Brittany)	as in the table above (i.e. including excerpts from the Capitula Dacheriana)
P_{38}	Paris, Bibliothèque nationale, Lat. 12444 (Sangerm. 938) (written end of eighth or beginning of ninth century probably in Fleury)	Collectio Sangermanensis XXI titulorum (including excerpts from among others the Collectio canonum Hibernensis, Isidore's Etymologiae, ancient Eastern, African and Gallic conciliar canons [in various versions, some of which are otherwise unknown], Collectio canonum Pithouensis, the Statuta ecclesiae antiqua, decretals from Siricius to Gregory I, the Libellus responsionum, the Half Form of the Paenitentiale Umbrense, Basil's Regula, Gennadius of Massilia’s Liber ecclesiasticorum dogmatum, Caesarius's letter Ecce manifestissime, and the writings of Ambrose, Jerome, Augustine, Cassian, and Cyril); a long and (as it currently stands) incomplete series of excerpts from the Collectio canonum Hibernensis, possibly meant as a continuation of the Collectio Sangermanensis
Sg_{1}*	St Gallen, Stiftsbibliothek, Cod. 150, pp. 323–84 (written between 820 and 840 in St. Gallen)	as in the table above (i.e. including excerpts from the first half of Paenitentiale Umbrense)
St_{6}+Da_{1}+Do_{1}	Stuttgart, Württembergische Landesbibliothek, Cod. Fragm. 100 A, w, x, y and z + Darmstadt, Hessische Landes- und Hochschulbibliothek, MS 895 fragm. + Donaueschingen, Hofbibliothek, MS 925 Fragm. (written about 800 probably in northern Italy)	Epitome Hispana (fragmentary; excerpts); Paenitentiale Oxoniense II (fragmentary); Paenitentiale Ecgberhti (prologue and c. 4.15 only, possibly once followed by further Paenitentiale Ecgberhti material); a series of penitential excerpts (fragmentary; including excerpts from the earlier chapters of Paenitentiale Umbrense, Paenitentiale Cummeani, and Paenitentiale Burgundense); Paenitentiale Bedae (first preface and first sentence of second preface only, possibly once followed by further Paenitentiale Bedae material)
St_{1}	Stuttgart, Württembergische Landesbibliothek, HB. VI. 107 (written end of the eleventh century in southwest Germany)	Collectio 74 titulorum (Swabian recension); Decretum Gelasianum; De ecclesiis (a collection of canons in 47 chapters); Bernold of Constance, Collectio de excommunicatione (incomplete); De illicitis coniunctionibus (a collection of canons in 24chapters); Brevis denotatio VI principalium sinodorum (a.k.k. Adnotatio I); De auctoritate IIIIor principalium conciliorum (excerpt Pope Gregory I, Epistula ad Iohannem Constantinopolitanum); canons from the councils of Nicaea, Constantinople, Ephesus, and Chalcedon; Sciendum quod plures orientalium conciliorum ediciones ... per beatum Adrianum papam occidentalibus ęcclesiis directa probatur; Brevis denotatio canonum subter annexorum ... (a.k.a. Adnotatio II); Collectio 98 capitulorum (cc. 8 and 24 only); canon 27 of the council of Mainz in 847; excerpts from the Collectio 98 capitulorum; Augustinus contra Novatum; Paenitentiale Umbrense cc. 14.20, 2.16 (first part), 2.17 (first part), 2.3 (second part), 2.1 (first part), 8.1, xxxxx
V_{23}+Mb_{2}	Vatican, Biblioteca Apostolica Vaticana, Vat. lat. 5751, fols 1–54 + Milan, Biblioteca Ambrosiana, G. 58 sup., fols 41–64 (written end of ninth century in Bobbio)	Collectio canonum Dacheriana (preface only, without the final paragraph describing the structure of the collection proper); Pseudo-Chrysostom, Sermo de penitentia (Provida mente, short form); Octo sunt vitia principalia (= Cassian's Collationes cc. 5.2 and 5.16, and the prologue of the Paenitentiale Columbani B ); Paenitentiale Oxoniense (prologue only, and in shortened form); an unidentified penitential text (Incipit de sacrificiis et remissione fratrum. Sed fortasse dicant ... per Iesum Christum dominum nostrum); Paenitentiale Cummeani (prologue only); Halitgar's Paenitentiale (preface and books I–II only); Pope Gregory I, Epistula ad Secundinum (beginning only, with interpolation De reparatione lapsi); the Isidorian Epistula ad Massonam; canons of the council of Agde (506); Paenitentiale Pseudo-Romanum (= Book VI of Halitgar's Paenitentiale); a short collection of Gallic canons; Epitome Hispana (excerpts); Canones Gregorii though here ascribed to Theodore (excerpts: cc. 1–8, 12–16, 21–5, 29–31); Capitula iudiciorum (variant version, with Excarpsus Cummeani cc. 7-15 and 20); Pseudo-Clemens I, Epistula ad Iacobum; a penitential ordo with two prayers; Paenitentiale Merseburgense a (with a Columbanian prologue); the canons of the Admonitio generalis of 789 (incomplete); Isidore, De ecclesiasticis officiis, cc. 42–3; Paenitentiale Cummeani (without prologue); ‘Inquisitio sancti Hieronomi’ (commutations); Paenitentiale Ambrosianum; Vorstufe des Paenitentiale additivum Pseudo-Bedae–Ecgberhti; Excarpsus Cummeani (excerpts: cc. 3.21, 3.23-24, 3.42, 3.36, 3.38); Gennadius of Massilia, Liber ecclesiasticorum dogmatum; Tertullian, De oratione cc. 9–end; the canons from the council of Ephesus (versio Isidori); the canons from the council of Gangra (fragmentary: title only)
W_{11}	Vienna, Österreichische Nationalbibliothek, Cod. Lat. 2231 (s. ix/x, Italy or south Francia)	xxxxxxxxxxxxx

The following table summarizes the manuscript distribution of the several versions of the Paenitentiale Theodori (not including small excerpts):

=== Summary of manuscript distribution ===
Version	No. of witnesses	Sigla of witnesses
Canones Basilienses	2	Ba_{2}, Le_{1}
Canones Cottoniani	1	L_{11}
Capitula Dacheriana	2	P_{22}, P_{36}
Canones Gregorii	5	M_{14}, O_{2}, P_{12}, P_{27}, Pr_{1}
Paenitentiale Umbrense Full Form	7	Cb_{4}, M_{17}, V_{5}, V_{6}, W_{7}, W_{9}, Wz_{2} (+ the extensive excerpts in K_{5})
Paenitentiale Umbrense Half Form	numerous	Sg_{1}, Collectio canonum Quesnelliana witnesses (P_{5}, P_{7}, P_{25}), Collectio canonum vetus Gallica witnesses (Br_{7}, K_{1}, P_{10}, St_{2} [= 'North French' class]; St_{3} [= 'South German' class]), Collectio canonum Sancti Amandi witnesses (B_{5}, P_{6}/P_{26}, P_{39}) (+ the extensive excerpts in P_{38})

Finsterwalder further divided the witnesses of the Paenitentiale Umbrense into two classes ...

Of the earliest manuscript witnesses, namely those dating to the end of the eighth or beginning of the ninth centuries, none originate in England, the supposed place of origin of the Paenitentiale Theodori; this is not unusual, however, since many early Insular texts survive today exclusively in Continental witnesses. The majority of extant manuscripts of the Paenitentiale Theodori originate in either Burgundy, northeastern France, and the region of the Rhine and Main rivers. This is significant, as it is these areas in which the Anglo-Saxon mission, specifically that part directed by Boniface, operated in during the first half of the eighth century. The manuscript evidence may thus reflect an early transmission within the scribal centres in the area of this mission, and so may indicate Anglo-Saxon involvement in the Paententiale Theodori's early dissemination throughout and/or its introduction to the Continent.

== Reception ==
As discussed above (Authorship), the Capitula Dacheriana was perhaps the earliest of the several versions. Based on the close connection between the Capitula Dacheriana and the Collectio Hibernensis, Charles-Edwards has argued that the Capitula Dacheriana were produced, perhaps in conjunction with the Hibernensis, in Ireland, whence the text was imported along with the Hibernensis to Brittany and subsequently Francia.

The most likely candidate for the introduction of the Paenitentiale Umbrense to the Continent is Boniface, an Anglo-Saxon missionary and a competent canonist who work tirelessly to reform the Frankish, German and Bavarian churches in the first half of the eighth century. Boniface knew the Paenitentiale Umbrense, for quotations of it pepper several canonical works that are attributed to him. Boniface also knew, and worked closely with, the papal document known as the Libellus responsionum. It is no surprise, then, that the earliest manuscript witnesses of the Paenitentiale Umbrense transmit this text in close proximity with the Libellus responsionum. It was also probably Boniface who was responsible for introducing the Paenitentiale Umbrense to the Corbie redaction of the Collectio canonum vetus Gallica, in whose creation he seems to have played some part.

The Canones Gregorii is quoted twice in c. 19 of Pirmin's Scarapsus, and on this basis Eckhard Hauswald, the most recent editor of the Scarapsus, was able to date this text to between 725 and 750 The Paenitentiale Umbrense was also used as a source for two early eighth-century Continental penitentials, namely the Excarpsus Cummeani and the Capitula iudiciorum. And several chapters from the Half Form were added to the text of the Corbie redaction of the Collectio canonum vetus Gallica, produced in the second quarter of the eighth century — this in addition to the inclusion of nearly the entire latter half (= Book II or Half Form) of the Paenitentiale Umbrense in the Vetus Gallica appendix. Altogether, these four works demonstrate that the Paenitentiale Umbrense was available for use on the Continent well before the year 750. The Collectio Sangermanensis, dating to the second half of the eighth century and probably also produced at Corbie, also draws on the Paenitentiale Umbrense ...

Towards the end of the eighth century, Paul the deacon, in his Historia Langobardorum c. 5.30, testified to Theodore's reputation as a promulgator of penitential canons.

It is perhaps significant that four of the five Collectio canonum vetus Gallica witnesses that contain an appended copy of the Half Form of the Paenitentiale Umbrense — Br_{7}, K_{1}, P_{10}, St_{2} — are those from Mordek's 'North French' class. Moreover, Br_{7}, K_{1}, P_{10}, St_{2} are the only copies of the Collectio canonum vetus Gallica to contain a series of chapters drawn from the monastic rules of Columban, Macarius, Basil and Benedict (Collectio canonum vetus Gallica cc. 46.26–37). These are the only chapters in the entire Collectio canonum vetus Gallica tradition to draw on monastic sources. The fifth Collectio canonum vetus Gallica witness that contains a copy of the Half Form of the Paenitentiale Umbrense — St_{3} — is from Mordek's 'South German' class, a class that represents a tradition about as old as the 'North French' one (i.e. the 740's; both traditions stem ultimately from a mid-eighth-century Corbie redaction). However, whereas the manuscripts of the 'North French' tradition preserve more or less intact the series of mainly penitential texts appended to the Collectio canonum vetus Gallica (Synodus II Patricii, Paenitentiale Umbrense, etc.), most of the manuscripts of the 'South German' class have modified greatly the arrangement and constituent texts of this appended series. The 'South German' manuscript St_{3} is exceptional, however. As Mordek has shown, it is not only the most faithful witness to the 'South German' Vetus Gallica tradition, it is also the witness with an appendix most resembling that of the 'North French' tradition. It is, for example, the only manuscript from outside the 'North French' group to contain in its appendix the Synodus II Patricii, the Isidorian Epistula ad Massonam, the canons of the council of Rome in 595 (Pope Gregory I's Libellus synodicus), and the Paenitentiale Umbrense. What might therefore have seemed like an anomaly in the tradition of the Paenitentiale Umbrense + Collectio canonum vetus Gallica combination — namely that an apparently distinctive feature of the 'North French' tradition (the presence of the Paenitentiale Umbrense in the appendix) is also shared by a single 'South German' manuscript — in fact is only evidence that the Paenitentiale Umbrense was part of the original series of texts appended to the Corbie redaction of the Collectio canonum vetus Gallica in the mid-eighth century.

According to Mordek, fols 80–195 of P_{6} (which contain the Collectio canonum Sancti Amandi, the Libellus responsionum, Pope Gregory II's letter for Boniface beginning Desiderabilem mihi, the Half Form of the Paenitentiale Umbrense, the canons of the council of Rome in 721, and the canons of the council of Rome in 595) are likely a copy — modified with the help of a Collectio Hispana of either the Gallican or Pseudo-Isidorian form — of fols 128–266 of P_{26}.

Although P_{39} is above classified as a Collectio canonum Sancti Amandi witness, and although it exhibits the same Paenitentiale Umbrense omissions that are characteristic of all Sancti Amandi witnesses (namely omission of 16.1–3 and 25.5–26.9), there are nevertheless reasons not to associate the P_{39} copy of the Paenitentiale Umbrense with the Sancti Amandi tradition. First, it has long been recognized that the contents of P_{39} are very similar to those of Berlin, Staatsbibliothek Preußischer Kulturbesitz, Phill. 1741, copied in the same place and time as P_{39} (ca 850×875 in Reims). However, the section of P_{39} that contains the Paenitentiale Umbrense (fols 151–166 = Böhringer's "Teil II") is not duplicated in Phill. 1741. What is more, this section of P_{39}, which is self-contained on two gatherings (gatherings 21–22), may very well have once been separate from the rest of the manuscript, for it begins with a change of scribal hand, and the text on the last page ends imperfectly (fol 166v: Si quis metropolitanus episcopus nisi quod ad suam solummodo propriam pertinet parrochiam sine concilio). Fols 151–166 of P_{39} may therefore have originated as a stand-alone dossier of materials, and only been joined with the rest of the codex (i.e. the part of the codex with the Sancti Amandi excerpts) at a later time.

== Editions ==
The Canones Basilienses has been edited once:

- F.B. Asbach, ed., Das Poenitentiale Remense und der sogen. Excarpsus Cummeani: Überlieferung, Quellen und Entwicklung zweier kontinentaler Bußbücher aus der 1. Hälfte des 8. Jahrhunderts (Regensburg, 1975), Appendix, pp. 80–9.
- A new edition is currently in preparation by Michael D. Elliot.

The Canones Cottoniani has been edited once:

- P.W. Finsterwalder, ed., Die Canones Theodori Cantuariensis und ihre Überlieferungsformen (Weimar, 1929), pp. 271–84, printing from L_{11}. (Note: Wasserschleben had previously prepared an "implicit edition" of the Canones Cottoniani in his Die Bussordnungen der abendländischen Kirche, pp. 181–82, and before that B. Thorpe had collated parts of L_{11} against his edition of the Paenitentiale pseudo-Theodori in his Ancient laws and institutes of England, 2 vols [London, 1840], II, pp. 1–62.).
- A new edition is currently in preparation by Michael D. Elliot.

The Capitula Dacheriana has been edited three times and reprinted three times:

- Luc d'Achery, ed., Veterum aliquot scriptorum ... spicilegium, 13 vols (Paris, 1655–1677), IX, pp. 52–62, printing from P_{36}.
  - P. Labbè and G. Cossart, eds, Sacrosancta concilia, ad regiam editionem exacta quæ nunc quarta parte prodit auctior, 17 vols (Paris, 1671–1672), VI, Appendix, cols 1875–1878, reprinting d'Achery's edition.
  - Jacques Petit, ed., Theodori sanctissimi ac doctissimi archiepiscopi Cantuariensis Poenitentiale ..., 2 vols (Paris, 1677), pp. 86–7, reprinting selected canons from d'Achery's edition and collating these with readings from his own edition of the Half Form of the Paenitentiale Umbrense.
  - L.-F.-J. de la Barre, ed., Spicilegium sive collectio veterum aliquot scriptorum qui in Galliae bibliothecis delituerant ..., 3 vols (Paris, 1723), I, pp. 486–90, reprinting d'Achery's edition, with variant readings supplied from P_{22} (via a transcript prepared by Edmond Martène), and with the Canones Adomnani appended to the end.
- F.W.H. Wasserschleben, ed., Die Bussordnungen der abendländischen Kirche (Halle, 1851), pp. 145–60, reprinting de-La-Barre's reprint of d'Achery's edition, but also using transcripts of P_{36} and P_{22} prepared by F.H. Knust.
- P.W. Finsterwalder, ed., Die Canones Theodori Cantuariensis und ihre Überlieferungsformen (Weimar, 1929), pp. 239–52, printing from P_{22}, with variant readings supplied from P_{36}.
- A new edition (based principally on P_{36}) is currently in preparation by Michael D. Elliot.

The Canones Gregorii has been edited five times and reprinted once:

- F.W.H. Wasserschleben, Beitraege zur Geschichte der vorgratianischen Kirchenrechtsquellen (Leipzig, 1839), pp. 119–24, printing a selection of excerpts from Me_{1} that include chapters from the Canones Gregorii.
- F. Kunstmann, ed., Die Lateinischen Pönitentialbücher der Angelsachsen, mit geschichtlicher Einleitung, (Mainz, 1844), pp. 129–41, printing from M_{14}.
  - F.W.H. Wasserschleben, ed., Die Bussordnungen der abendländischen Kirche (Halle, 1851), pp. 160–80, reprinting Kunstmann's edition, and supplying variant readings from P_{12}.
- K. Hildenbrand, ed., Untersuchungen über die germanischen Pönitentialbücher (Würzburg, 1851), pp. 126–29, printing two short series of canons from M_{6} and M_{2}, each of which includes excerpts from the Canones Gregorii.
- H.J. Schmitz, ed., Die Bussbücher und das kanonische Bussverfahren, nach handschriftlichen Quellen dargestellt (Düsseldorf, 1898), pp. 523–42, printing from P_{12}, and supplying variant readings from M_{14} as well as other penitential texts (including the Capitula Dacheriana and the Paenitentiale Umbrense)
- P.W. Finsterwalder, ed., Die Canones Theodori Cantuariensis und ihre Überlieferungsformen (Weimar, 1929), pp. 253–70, printing from P_{27}, with variant readings supplied from and M_{14} and P_{12}, as well as from L_{1}, M_{6}, and Me_{1}.
- A new edition (based principally on M_{14}) is currently in preparation by Michael D. Elliot.

The Full Form of the Paenitentiale Umbrense has been edited eight times and reprinted once:

- In twenty-nine chapter form:
  - J.W. Bickel, Review of Wasserschleben’s Beitraege, in Kritische Jahrbücher für deutsche Rechtswissenschaft 5 (1839), pp. 390–403, at pp. 399–400, printing the prologue, register (twenty-eight-chapter form) and epilogue from W_{9} and Wz_{2}.
  - K. Hildenbrand, ed., Untersuchungen über die germanischen Pönitentialbücher (Würzburg, 1851), pp. 86–125, printing from W_{9} and supplying variants from Wz_{2}, M_{17} as well as other penitential texts (including the Capitula Dacheriana [P_{36}], Canones Gregorii [M_{6}, M_{2}, M_{14}, Me_{1}, the latter two as reported by Kunstmann and Wasserschleben], and both the Canones Cottoniani [L_{11}] and Paenitentiale Umbrense [Cb_{4}] as reported in the limited collation notes to the edition of the Paenitentiale pseudo-Theodori by B. Thorpe, Ancient laws and institutes of England, 2 vols [London, 1840], II, pp. 1–62). (Note: Hildenbrand's edition numbers only twenty-eight chapters, because his main witness for the Full Form [W_{9}] is divided into twenty-eight chapters. Note too: Hildenbrand prints only the first part of the prologue, because his single witness to this part of the Full Form [Wz_{2}] is incomplete.)
  - A new edition (based principally on W_{7}) is currently in preparation by Michael D. Elliot.
- In two-book form:
  - F.W.H. Wasserschleben, ed., Die Bussordnungen der abendländischen Kirche (Halle, 1851), pp. 182–219, printing mainly from W_{9} (but with the prologue printed from W_{7}) and supplying variants from W_{7}, Wz_{2}, and Paris, Bibliothèque nationale, Lat. 13452 (an early-modern apograph of Cb_{4}), as well as several witnesses of the Half Form.
    - H.J. Schmitz, ed., Die Bussbücher und die Bussdisciplin der Kirche, nach handschriftlichen Quellen dargestellt (Mainz, 1883), pp. 524–50, claiming to print from W_{7}, but actually reprinting Wasserschleben's edition.
  - A.W. Haddan and W. Stubbs, eds, Councils and ecclesiastical documents relating to Great Britain and Ireland, 3 vols (vol. II in 2 parts) (Oxford, 1869–1873), III, pp. 173–204, printing from Cb_{4}, with variant readings supplied from Wasserschleben's edition. (Note: Cb_{4} was previously collated [as "N"] by B. Thorpe against his edition of the Paenitentiale pseudo-Theodori in his Ancient laws and institutes of England, 2 vols [London, 1840], II, pp. 1–62.)
  - H.J. Schmitz, ed., Die Bussbücher und das kanonische Bussverfahren, nach handschriftlichen Quellen dargestellt (Düsseldorf, 1898), pp. 544–56, printing cc. 1–16.3 only from W_{7}, and supplying variant readings from W_{9}, Wz_{2}, and Paris, Bibliothèque nationale, Lat. 13452 (an early-modern apograph of Cb_{4}).
  - P.W. Finsterwalder, ed., Die Canones Theodori Cantuariensis und ihre Überlieferungsformen (Weimar, 1929), pp. 285–334, printing his recension based on most of the extant witnesses.
- Just the epilogue
  - A Mai, ed., Nova patrum bibliotheca, vol. VII, (Rome, 1854), part 3, p. 76, printing the fragmentary text of V_{6}.

The Half Form of the Paenitentiale Umbrense (= cc. 16.4–25.4 + cc. 26(27)–29 + c. 13) has been edited twice and reprinted twice:

- Jacques Petit, ed., Theodori sanctissimi ac doctissimi archiepiscopi Cantuariensis Poenitentiale ..., 2 vols (Paris, 1677), pp. 1–14, printing from P_{25} and P_{7}. (Note: Petit also produced a partial recension of the Half Form [pp. 88–94] by collating his edition against readings found in other authorities [Burchard, Gratian, etc.].)
  - Nicolas J. Poisson, Delectus actorum ecclesiae universalis, seu nova summa conciliorum, epistolarum, decretorum SS. pontificum, capitularium, etc. ..., 2 vols (Lyon, 1706) II, cols 2274–2279, reprinting Petit's editions.
  - J.-P. Migne, ed., Patrologiæ cursus completus sive bibliotheca universalis ... omnium SS. patrum, doctorum scriptorumque ecclesiasticorum qui ab ævo apostoloca ad usque Innocentii III tempora floruerunt ... series secunda (= Latina) ..., 217 vols (Paris, 1844–1864), XCIX, cols 927A–936C, reprinting Petit's edition.
- H.J. Schmitz, ed., Die Bussbücher und das kanonische Bussverfahren, nach handschriftlichen Quellen dargestellt (Düsseldorf, 1898), pp. 566–80, printing from B_{5}, and supplying variant readings from several other Half Form witnesses, as well as W_{7} and M_{17}.

== Bibliography ==
- F.B. Asbach, ed., Das Poenitentiale Remense und der sogen. Excarpsus Cummeani: Überlieferung, Quellen und Entwicklung zweier kontinentaler Bußbücher aus der 1. Hälfte des 8. Jahrhunderts (Regensburg, 1975).
- T.M. Charles-Edwards, "The penitential of Theodore and the Iudicia Theodori", in Archbishop Theodore: commemorative studies on his life and influence, ed. M. Lapidge, Cambridge studies in Anglo-Saxon England 11 (Cambridge, 1995), 141–74.
- P.W. Finsterwalder, ed., Die Canones Theodori Cantuariensis und ihre Überlieferungsformen (Weimar, 1929).
- R. Flechner, "An insular tradition of ecclesiastical law: fifth to eighth century", in Anglo-Saxon/Irish relations before the Vikings, eds J. Graham-Campbell and M. Ryan, Proceedings of the British Academy 157 (Oxford, 2009), 23–46.
- R. Flechner, "The making of the Canons of Theodore", in Peritia 17–18 (2003–2004), pp. 121–43.
- A.J. Frantzen, The literature of penance in Anglo-Saxon England (New Brunswick, N.J., 1983), pp. 62–69, et passim.
- A.W. Haddan and W. Stubbs, eds, Councils and ecclesiastical documents relating to Great Britain and Ireland, 3 vols (vol. II in 2 parts) (Oxford, 1869–1873), III, pp. 173–213..
- R. Haggenmüller, Die Überlieferung der Beda und Egbert zugeschriebenen Bussbücher, Europäische Hochschulschriften, Reihe 3: Geschichte und ihre Hilfswissenschaften 461 (Frankfurt am Main, 1991).
- L. Körntgen, Studien zu den Quellen der frühmittelalterlichen Bußbücher, Quellen und Forschungen zum Recht im Mittelalter 7 (Sigmaringen, 1993).
- R. Kottje, "Paenitentiale Theodori", in Handwörterbuch zur deutschen Rechtsgeschichte. III. Band: List–Protonotar, eds A. Erler and E. Kaufmann, with W. Stammler and R. Schmidt-Wiegand (Berlin, 1984), cols 1413–16.
- J.T. McNeill and H.M. Gamer, Medieval handbooks of penance: a translation of the principal libri poenitentiales and selections from related documents (New York, 1938), pp. 58–60 and 179–215.
- R. Meens, Het tripartite boeteboek. Overlevering en betekenis van vroegmiddeleeuwse biechtvoorschriften (met editie en vertaling van vier tripartita), Middeleeuwse studies en bronnen 41 (Hilversum, 1994), pp. 30–6.
- H. Mordek, Bibliotheca capitularium regum Francorum manuscripta. Überlieferung und Traditionszusammenhang der fränkischen Herrschererlasse, MGH Hilfsmittel 15 (Munich, 1995).
- H. Mordek, Kirchenrecht und Reform im Frankenreich: die Collectio vetus Gallica, die älteste systematische Kanonessammlung des fränkischen Gallien. Studien und Edition, Beiträge zur Geschichte und Quellenkunde des Mittelalters 1 (Berlin, 1975).
- F.W.H. Wasserschleben, ed., Die Bussordnungen der abendländischen Kirche (Halle, 1851), pp. 13–37 and 145–219.
