= Paenitentiale Bedae =

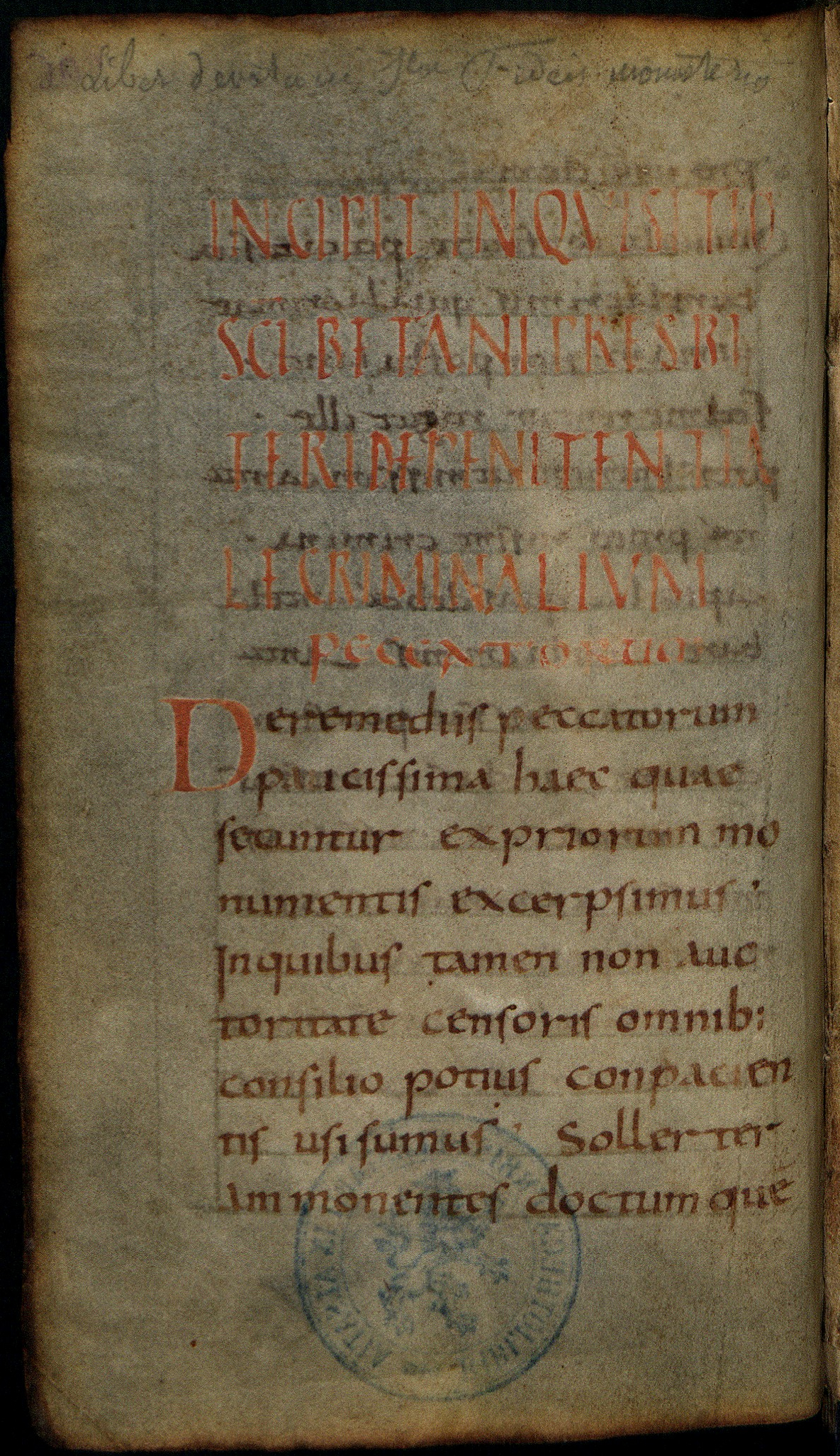
- Folio 96v from the Sélestat manuscript (Cod. 132), showing the beginning of the Paenitentiale Bedae
- Also known as: Paenitentiale Pseudo-Bedae
- Audience: Catholic clergy
- Language: medieval Latin
- Date: ca. 730?
- Authenticity: questionable
- Manuscript(s): four, plus fragments
- Genre: penitential, canon law collection
- Subject: ecclesiastical and lay discipline; ecclesiastical and lay penance

The Paenitentiale Bedae (also known as the Paenitentiale Pseudo-Bedae, or more commonly as either Bede's penitential or the Bedan penitential) is an early medieval penitential handbook composed around 730, possibly by the Anglo-Saxon monk Bede.

== Manuscripts and transmission ==
There are four extant manuscripts that contain the Paenitentiale Bedae, all dating to the ninth century, ranging geographically from northeastern France to the Main river region. The sigla given below (W_{9}, Z_{2}, etc.) are those introduced by Reinhard Haggenmüller.

| Siglum | Manuscript | Contents |
|---|---|---|
| Mp_{2} | Montpellier, Bibliothèque universitaire (Faculté de Médecine), MS 387, fols 1–80 (written middle of ninth century northeastern Francia) | xxxxxxxxxxxxxxxxxxx |
| Se_{2} | Sélestat, Bibliothèque humaniste, MS 132 (written middle of ninth century, possibly in Mainz) | rites for exorcism; incantations; Paenitentiale Ecgberhti; Paenitentiale Bedae; Excarpsus Cummeani |
| T_{5} | Stuttgart, Württembergische Landesbibliothek, Codex Fragm. 100 A, w, x, y and z + Darmstadt, Hessische Landes- und Hochschulbibliothek, MS 895 fragm. + Donaueschingen, Hofbibliothek, MS 925 Fragm. (written about 800 probably in northern Italy) | Epitome Hispana (fragmentary; excerpts); Paenitentiale Oxoniense II (fragmentary); Paenitentiale Ecgberhti (prologue and c. 4.15 only, possibly once followed by further Paenitentiale Ecgberhti material); a series of penitential excerpts (fragmentary; including excerpts from Paenitentiale Umbrense book I, Paenitentiale Cummeani, and Paenitentiale Burgundense); Paenitentiale Bedae (first preface and first sentence of second preface only, possibly once followed by further Paenitentiale Bedae material) |
| W_{9} | Vienna, Österreichische Nationalbibliothek, Codex lat. 2223 (written beginning of ninth century in the Main river region) | Paenitentiale Theodori (U version); Paenitentiale Bedae; Paenitentiale Cummeani (excerpt); Capitula iudiciorum (previously known as the Poenitentiale XXXV capitulorum); Libellus responsionum; miscellaneous creedal and theological works; Paenitentiale Ecgberhti |
| Z_{2} | Zürich, Zentralbibliothek, Car. C 176 (D 64), fols 1–136 (written ca 850×875 in eastern Francia) | xxxxxxxxxxxxx |

Haggenmüller divided the four main surviving witnesses of the Paenitentiale Bedae into two groups, based broadly on the regions in which they were produced, the nature and arrangement of their accompanying texts, and shared readings in the Paenitentiale Bedae itself.: the 'Rhine-Main river' group consists of the oldest manuscripts (W_{9} and Se_{1}), while the 'East-Frankish' group (Mp_{2} and Z_{2}) represents a slightly older tradition.

The Paenitentiale Bedae is also transmitted in somewhat altered form as part of two later penitential texts known as the Vorstufe des Paenitentiale additivum Pseudo-Bedae–Ecgberhti (or Preliminary Stage of the Unified Bedan-Ecgberhtine Penitential, in which the Paenitentiale Ecgberhti is affixed to the end of the Paenitentiale Bedae) and the Paenitentiale additivum Pseudo-Bedae–Ecgberhti (or Unified Bedan-Ecgberhtine Penitential; like the Preliminary Stage, but the whole is now preceded by the prefaces of both the Paenitentiale Bedae and the Paenitentiale Ecgberhti), and in greatly altered form in the still later Paenitentiale mixtum Pseudo-Bedae–Ecgberhti (or Merged Bedan-Ecgberhtine Penitential, in which the chapters of both the Paenitentiale Bedae and the Paenitentiale Ecgberhti are mixed together and arranged by topic).

== Editions ==
The Paenitentiale Bedae itself has been edited twice and reprinted once:

- F.W.H. Wasserschleben, ed., Die Bussordnungen der abendländischen Kirche (Halle, 1851), pp. 220–30, printing from W_{9}. This edition is currently standard.
  - W. Stubbs with A.W. Haddan, eds, Councils and ecclesiastical documents relating to Great Britain and Ireland, vol. 3 (Oxford, 1873), pp. 326–34, reprinting Wasserschleben's edition of W_{9}.
  - H.J. Schmitz, ed., Die Bussbücher und die Bussdisciplin der Kirche, nach handschriftlichen Quellen dargestellt (Mainz, 1883), pp. 556–64, printing an incomplete text of the Vorstufe from Munich, Bayerische Staatsbibliothek, Clm 12673 (up to c. 5.11), to which is appended a reprint of the final chapters of Wasserschleben's edition of W_{9}.

Much more numerous are editions of the Paenitentiale Bedae in the later modified forms mentioned above, namely the Vorstufe des Paenitentiale additivum Pseudo-Bedae–Ecgberhti, the Paenitentiale additivum Pseudo-Bedae–Ecgberhti, and the Paenitentiale mixtum Pseudo-Bedae–Ecgberhti. These works, which present the Paenitentiale Bedae material in sometimes greatly modified form, have been edited and reprinted many times since the early modern period.

The Vorstufe des Paenitentiale additivum Pseudo-Bedae–Ecgberhti has been edited four times:

- E. Martène and U. Durand, eds, Veterum scriptorum et monumentorum historicorum, dogmaticorum, moralium, amplissima collectio ..., 9 vols (Paris 1724–1733), vol. VII, cols 37–49, printing from a now lost St-Hubert manuscript.
- H.J. Schmitz, ed., Die Bussbücher und die Bussdisciplin der Kirche, nach handschriftlichen Quellen dargestellt (Mainz, 1883), pp. 573–87, printing an incomplete text of the Vorstufe from Munich, Bayerische Staatsbibliothek, Clm 12673.
- H.J. Schmitz, ed., Die Bussbücher und die Bussdisciplin der Kirche, nach handschriftlichen Quellen dargestellt (Mainz, 1883), pp. 556–64, printing an incomplete text of the Vorstufe from Munich, Bayerische Staatsbibliothek, Clm 12673 (as above).
- H.J. Schmitz, ed., Die Bussbücher und das kanonische Bussverfahren, nach handschriftlichen Quellen dargestellt (Düsseldorf, 1898), pp. 654–59, printing the Sonderrezension der Vorstufe des Paenitentiale additivum Pseudo-Bedae–Ecgberhti from Vatican, Biblioteca Apostolica Vaticana, Pal. lat. 294, fols 78–136, with variant readings from the W_{9} text of the Paenitentiale Bedae.

The Paenitentiale additivum Pseudo-Bedae–Ecgberhti has been edited three times and reprinted nine times:

- J. Heerwag, ed., Opera Bedae Venerabilis ... omnia in octo tomos distincta ... (Basel, 1563), VIII, cols 1127–34, printing from a now lost manuscript.
  - A. Augustín, ed., Canones paenitentiales quibus ordine succedunt ... (Tarragona, 1581), pp. 107–19, reprinting Heerwag.
    - G. Rocchi, ed., Antonii Augustini Archiepiscopi Tarraconensis opera omnia ..., 8 vols (Luca, 1765–1774), III, pp. 298–308, reprinting Augustín.
  - H. Spelman, with J. Stephens and J. Spelman, eds, Concilia, decreta, leges, constitutiones in re ecclesiarum orbis Britannici ... ab initio christianæ ibidem religionis, ad nostram usque ætatem ... Tom. I: ... a primis Christi seculis usque ad introitum Normannorum ... (London, 1639), pp. 281–88, reprinting Heerwag.
    - Conciliorum omnium generalium et provincialium collectio regia, 37 vols (Paris, 1644), XVII, pp. 517–29, reprinting Spelman.
      - P. Labbè and G. Cossart, eds, Sacrosancta concilia ad regiam editionem exacta quæ nunc quarta parte prodit auctior, 16 vols (Paris, 1671–1672), VI, cols 1611–1619, reprinting the Collectio regia.
        - N. Coleti, ed. Sacrosancta concilia ad regiam editionem exacta, quæ olim quarta parte prodit auctior studio Philip. Labbei, & Gabr. Cossartii ..., 23 vols (Venice, 1728–1733), VIII, cols 359–366, reprinting Labbè–Cossart.
        - G.D. Mansi, ed., Sacrorum conciliorum nova et amplissima collectio ..., 31 vols (Florence, 1759–1798; repr. with 22 additional volumes containing supplementary material, Paris and Leipzig, 1901–1927), XII, cols 489–498, reprinting Labbè–Cossart.
          - J.-P. Migne, ed., Patrologiæ cursus completus sive bibliotheca universalis ... omnium SS. patrum, doctorum scriptorumque ecclesiasticorum qui ab ævo apostoloca ad usque Innocentii III tempora floruerunt ... series secunda (= Latina) ..., 217 vols, (Paris, 1844–1864), LXXXIX, cols 443–454, reprinting Mansi.
          - J.-P. Migne, ed., Patrologiæ cursus completus sive bibliotheca universalis ... omnium SS. patrum, doctorum scriptorumque ecclesiasticorum qui ab ævo apostoloca ad usque Innocentii III tempora floruerunt ... series secunda (= Latina) ..., 217 vols, (Paris, 1844–1864), XCIV, cols 567–675, reprinting ???.
- J. Morin, ed., Commentarius historicus de disciplina in administratione sacramenti poenitentiæ tredecim primis seculis in ecclesia occidentali ... (Paris, 1651), Appendix, pp. 32–6, printing from a now lost Saint-Hubert manuscript.
- B. Albers, "Wann sind die Beda-Egbert’schen Bussbücher verfaßt worden, und wer ist ihr Verfasser?", Archiv für katholisches Kirchenrecht 81 (1901), pp. 393–420.

The Paenitentiale mixtum Pseudo-Bedae–Ecgberhti has been edited twice and reprinted twice:

- F.W.H. Wasserschleben, Beitraege zur Geschichte der vorgratianischen Kirchenrechtsquellen, (Leipzig, 1839), pp. 126–45, printing from Cologne, Erzbischöfliche Diözesan- und Dombibliothek, Codex 118.
- F. Kunstmann, ed., Die Lateinischen Pönitentialbücher der Angelsachsen, mit geschichtlicher Einleitung, (Mainz, 1844), pp. 142–75, printing from Munich, Bayerische Staatsbibliothek, Clm 3851 and Munich, Bayerische Staatsbibliothek, Clm 3853.
  - F.W.H. Wasserschleben, ed., Die Bussordnungen der abendländischen Kirche (Halle, 1851), pp. 248–83, reprinting Kunstmann's edition of the Paenitentiale mixtum Pseudo-Bedae–Ecgberhti.
  - H.J. Schmitz, ed., Die Bussbücher und das kanonische Bussverfahren, nach handschriftlichen Quellen dargestellt (Düsseldorf, 1898), pp. 679–701, reprinting Kunstmann's edition of the Paenitentiale mixtum Pseudo-Bedae–Ecgberhti.

== Bibliography ==
- Reinhold Haggenmüller, Die Überlieferung der Beda und Egbert zugeschriebenen Bussbücher, Europäische Hochschulschriften. Reihe III, Geschichte und ihre Hilfswissenschaften 461 (Frankfurt am Main, 1991).
- Ludger Körntgen, Studien zu den Quellen der frühmittelalterlichen Bußbücher, Quellen Und Forschungen Zum Recht Im Mittelalter 7 (Sigmaringen, 1993).
