= Patricius Ararsius =

Patricius Ararsius (Ancient Greek: Πατρίκιος Ἀράρσιος) was a Christian writer who was the author of a discourse in Greek entitled Oceanus, a passage out of which, relating to Meletius and Arius, is quoted in the Synodicon Vetus. The title of this fragment is Πατρικίου Ἀραρσίου τοῦ μάκαρος, ἐκ τοῦ λόγου αὐτοῦ τοῦ ἐπιλεγομένου Ὠκεανοῦ. Nothing more is known of the writer.
