= Thomas of Chobham =

Medieval English theologian and writer

Thomas of Chobham (also called Thomas Chobham or Thomas of Chabham) was an English theologian and subdean of Salisbury, who was born c. 1160, presumably in Chobham, Surrey, and died between 1233 and 1236 in Salisbury, Wiltshire.

Thomas Chobham studied in Paris in the 1180s, likely under Peter the Chanter. He is best known for his influential work on penance which combines Canon law, theology, and practical advice for confessors. It is known by many titles, and there has been much confusion over both author and incipit, which is often related as Cum miseratione domini. More fully and correctly, this should be "Cum miserationes domini sint super omnia". The title is based on Psalm 144:9.

Flacius Illyricus, for example, in his entry on Thomas Aquinas in his Catalogus Testium Veritatis 1556, considers this work to be by Aquinas and gives the incipit: "Commiserationes Domini sunt super omnia".

== Works ==
- Cum miseratione domini, a Summa de penitentia, published as Thomae de Chobham Summa Confessorum, edited by F. Broomfield, Analecta Mediaevalia Namurcensia 25 (Louvain: Éditions Nauwelaerts, 1968).
- Sermones, published as Thomas de Chobham, Sermones, edited by F. Morenzoni, Corpus Christianorum, continuatio medievalis 82A (Turnhout: Brepols, 1993).
- Summa de arte praedicandi, published as Thomas de Chobham, Summa de arte praedicandi, edited by F. Morenzoni, Corpus Christianorum, continuatio medievalis 82 (Turnhout: Brepols, 1988).
- Summa de commendatione virtutum et extirpatione vitiorum, published as Thomas de Chobham, Summa de commendatione virtutum et extirpatione vitiorum, edited by F. Morenzoni, Corpus Christianorum, continuatio medievalis 82B (Turnhout: Brepols, 1997).

== Bibliography ==
In addition to the introductions and notes to the above works, see:

- J. W. Baldwin, Masters, Princes and Merchants: The Social Views of Peter the Chanter and His Circle, 2 vv. (Princeton: Princeton University Press, 1970).
- Gillian R. Evans. “Thomas of Chobham on Preaching and Exegesis,” Recherches de théologie ancienne et médiévale 52 (1985): 159–70.
- Joseph Goering, “Chobham, Thomas of (d. 1233×6)”, Oxford Dictionary of National Biography (Oxford: Oxford University Press, 2004).
- Joseph Goering, William de Montibus (c. 1140–1213): The Schools and the Literature of Pastoral Care, Studies and Texts 108 (Toronto: Pontifical Institute of Mediaeval Studies, 1992).
- H.F. Rubel, “Chabham’s Penitential and its Influence in the Thirteenth Century,” Publications of the Modern Language Association of America 40, no. 2 (June 1925): 225–39.
