= Summa confessorum =

13th-century work on penance

The Summa confessorum, also known as the Summa de penitentia and the Summa Cum miseratione domini, is a 13th-century work on penance by Thomas of Chobham. It began to circulate in 1216 and survives in more than a hundred manuscripts.

== Publication history ==
Likely a student of Peter Cantor, Thomas of Chobham began writing his work on penance around the same time that annual confession was affirmed as mandatory by the Fourth Council of the Lateran, with Pope Innocent III specifying that priests ought to consider the individual circumstances of the penitent. However, according to F. Broomfield, Thomas' work "was very little influenced" by the council, and Thomas might not even have been aware of the canons passed by the council. Its authorship has also been misattributed to several other writers, including Innocent III himself.

What came to be referred to as the Summa confessorum began to circulate in 1216. It attracted a wide readership, especially in colleges and priories, and was one of the most copied penitential works in the late medieval period. Significant portions of the Summa were either quoted or alluded to in later theological handbooks, including the Speculum iuniorum (c. 1250), the Signaculum apostolatus mei (13th century), and the Speculum curatorum (c. 1340). It was also a source for William of Pagula's Oculus Sacerdotis.

Over a hundred manuscripts of the Summa are still extant, with at least a couple dating to the 1480s. A critical edition based on three English manuscripts, titled Thomae de Chobham Summa Confessorum, was published by Broomfield in 1968.

== Content ==
The Summa represents an attempt to "make available the advices and conclusions of the moral theologians to the ordinary priests for specific cases." Thomas lays out the agenda of the work in its preface: "We will more carefully pursue the duties and practical considerations which are necessary for priests to hear confessions and enjoin penances." On one hand, Thomas notes that "if any sin is concealed, there is no confession, no absolution." On the other hand, he cautions priests not to extriere ("terrorise") penitents "lest they push them into obstinacy or despair."

Thomas begins by defining penance, before discussing the Ten Commandments, the Beatitudes, and spiritual gifts. After going through the consequences of sin and irregularities in the church, Thomas explores the relationship between the sacraments and a priest's ability to hear confession. Before a cleric can confess, for instance, a priest must inquire if he has discharged his clerical duties or not. Thomas then raises the question of whether or not intellectually disabled people or condemned criminals are eligible for penance.

Thomas devotes the most attention to issue of specific penances for specific sins (especially lust, wrath, and greed). However, he stops short of providing a list of "tariffed penances", given the possibility of additional factors in individual cases that may problematise them. Thomas examines a considerable range of problems in the Summa, such as breastfeeding, forced castration, and prostitution.

Throughout the Summa, Thomas constantly refers to the Bible as well as Peter Lombard's commentaries on the Psalms and the letters of Saint Paul. He also quotes Gratian, albeit without attribution.
