= Penitential =

Set of church rules concerning the Christian sacrament of penance

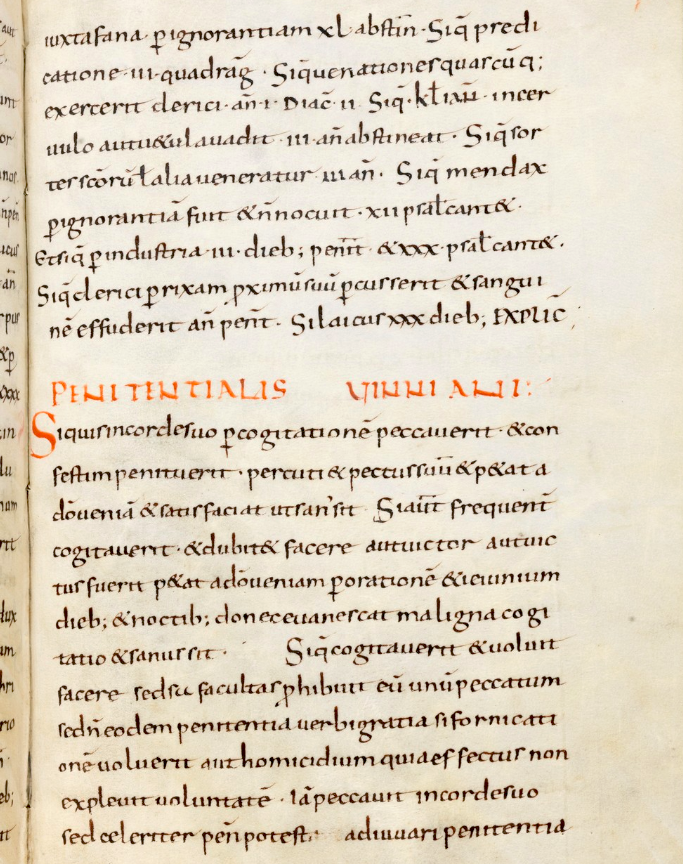
Incipit of the Paenitentiale Vinniani

A penitential is a book or set of church rules concerning the Christian sacrament of penance, used for regular private confession with a confessor-priest, a "new manner of reconciliation with God" that was promoted by Celtic monks in Ireland in the sixth century AD, under the Egyptian monastic influence of St John Cassian. It consisted of a list of sins and the appropriate penances prescribed for them, and served as a type of manual for confessors.

== Origin ==
The earliest important penitentials were those by the Irish abbots Cummean (who based his work on a sixth-century Celtic monastic text known as the Paenitentiale Ambrosianum) and Columbanus, and the Archbishop of Canterbury, Theodore of Tarsus. Most later penitentials are based on theirs, rather than on earlier Roman texts. The number of Irish penitentials and their importance is cited as evidence of the particular strictness of the Irish spirituality of the seventh century. Walter J. Woods holds that "over time the penitential books helped suppress homicide, personal violence, theft, and other offences that damaged the community and made the offender a target for revenge."

According to Thomas Pollock Oakley, the penitential guides first developed in Wales, probably at St. David's, and spread by missions to Ireland. They were brought to Britain with the Hiberno-Scottish mission and were introduced to the Continent by Irish and Anglo-Saxon missionaries.

== Praxis ==
As priests heard confessions, they began to compile unofficial handbooks that dealt with the most confessed sins and wrote down set penances for those sins. Penances would vary given both the severity of the offence and the status of the sinner, such that the penance imposed on a bishop would generally be more severe than that imposed on a deacon for the same offence. For stealing, Cummean prescribed that a layman shall do one year of penance; a cleric, two; a subdeacon three; a deacon, four; a priest, five; a bishop, six.

The list of various penitential acts imposed on the sinner to ensure reparation included more or less rigorous fasts, prostrations, deprivation of things otherwise allowable; also alms, prayers, and pilgrimages. The duration was specified in days, quarantines, or years. Gildas lists the penance for an inebriated monk, "If any one because of drunkenness is unable to sing the Psalms, being stupefied and without speech, he is deprived of dinner."

The penitentials advised the confessor to inquire into the sinner's state of mind and social condition. The priest was told to ask if the sinner before him was rich or poor; educated; ill; young or old; to ask if he or she had sinned voluntarily or involuntarily, and so forth. The spiritual and mental state of the sinner - as well as his or her social status was fundamental to the process. Moreover, some penitentials instructed the priest to ascertain the sinner's sincerity by observing posture and tone of voice.

Penitentials were soon compiled with the authorization of bishops concerned with enforcing uniform disciplinary standards within a given district.

== Commutation ==
The Penitential of Cummean counselled a priest to take into consideration in imposing a penance, the penitent's strengths and weaknesses. Those who could not fast were obliged instead to recite daily a certain number of psalms, to give alms, or perform some other penitential exercise as determined by the confessor.

Some penances could be commuted through payments or substitutions. While the sanctions in early penitentials, such as that of Gildas, were primarily acts of mortification or in some cases excommunication, the inclusion of fines in later compilations derive from secular law, and indicate a church becoming assimilated into the larger society. The connection with the principles embodied in law codes, which were largely composed of schedules of wergeld or compensation, are evident. "Recidivism was always possible, and the commutation of sentence by payment of cash perpetuated the notion that salvation could be bought".

The Liber poenitentiarius of John of God (d. 1267)

Commutations and the intersection of ecclesiastical penance with secular law both differed from locality to locality. Nor were commutations restricted to financial payments: extreme fasts and recitation of large numbers of psalms could also commute penances; the system of commutation did not reinforce commonplace connections between poverty and sinfulness, even though it favoured people of means and education over those without such advantages. But the idea that whole communities, from top to bottom, richest to poorest, submitted to the same form of ecclesiastical discipline is itself misleading. For example, meat was a rarity in the diet of the poor, with or without the imposition of ecclesiastical fasts. In addition, the system of public penance was not replaced by private penance; the penitentials themselves refer to public penitential ceremonies.

== Opposition ==
The provincial Council of Paris of 829 condemned the penitentials and ordered all of them to be burnt, for containing errors and arbitrary penances. In practice, a penitential remained one of the few books that a country priest might have possessed.

The objections of the Council of Paris concerned penitentials of uncertain authorship or origin. Penitentials continued to be written, edited, adapted, and, in England, translated into the vernacular. They served an important role in the education of priests as well as in the disciplinary and devotional practices of the laity.

Penitentials did not go out of existence in the late twelfth century. Some argue that the last penitential was composed by Alain de Lille, in 1180. Robert of Flamborough wrote his Liber Poenitentialis in 1208.

As the canon law was codified in the second millennium, a form with a different basis and emphasis, the confessors' manual (or handbook), was developed.

== List of penitentials ==
- Paenitentiale Vinniani
- Canones Adomnani
- Paenitentiale Gildae
- Paenitentialia Columbani
- Paenitentiale Cummeani
- Paenitentiale Theodori
- Paenitentiale Ecgberhti
- Paenitentiale Bedae
- Excarpsus Cummeani
- Paenitentiale Halitgari
- Collectio canonum quadripartita
- Handbook for a Confessor

== See also ==
- Fourth Council of the Lateran, 1215
- Summa confessorum, 1218

== Sources ==
- Allen J. Frantzen. The Literature of Penance in Anglo-Saxon England. 1983.
- John T. McNeill and Helena M. Gamer, trans. Medieval Handbooks of Penance. 1938, repr. 1965.
- Pierre J. Payer. Sex and the Penitentials. 1984.
- Rouche, Michel (1987). "The Early Middle Ages in the West: Sacred and Secret". In Veyne, Paul (ed.). A History of Private Life 1: From Pagan Rome to Byzantium. Harvard University Press. pp. 528–9.
- Catholic Encyclopedia: "Penitential Canons" "...have now only an historic interest."
