= Excarpsus Cummeani =

Eighth-century penitential

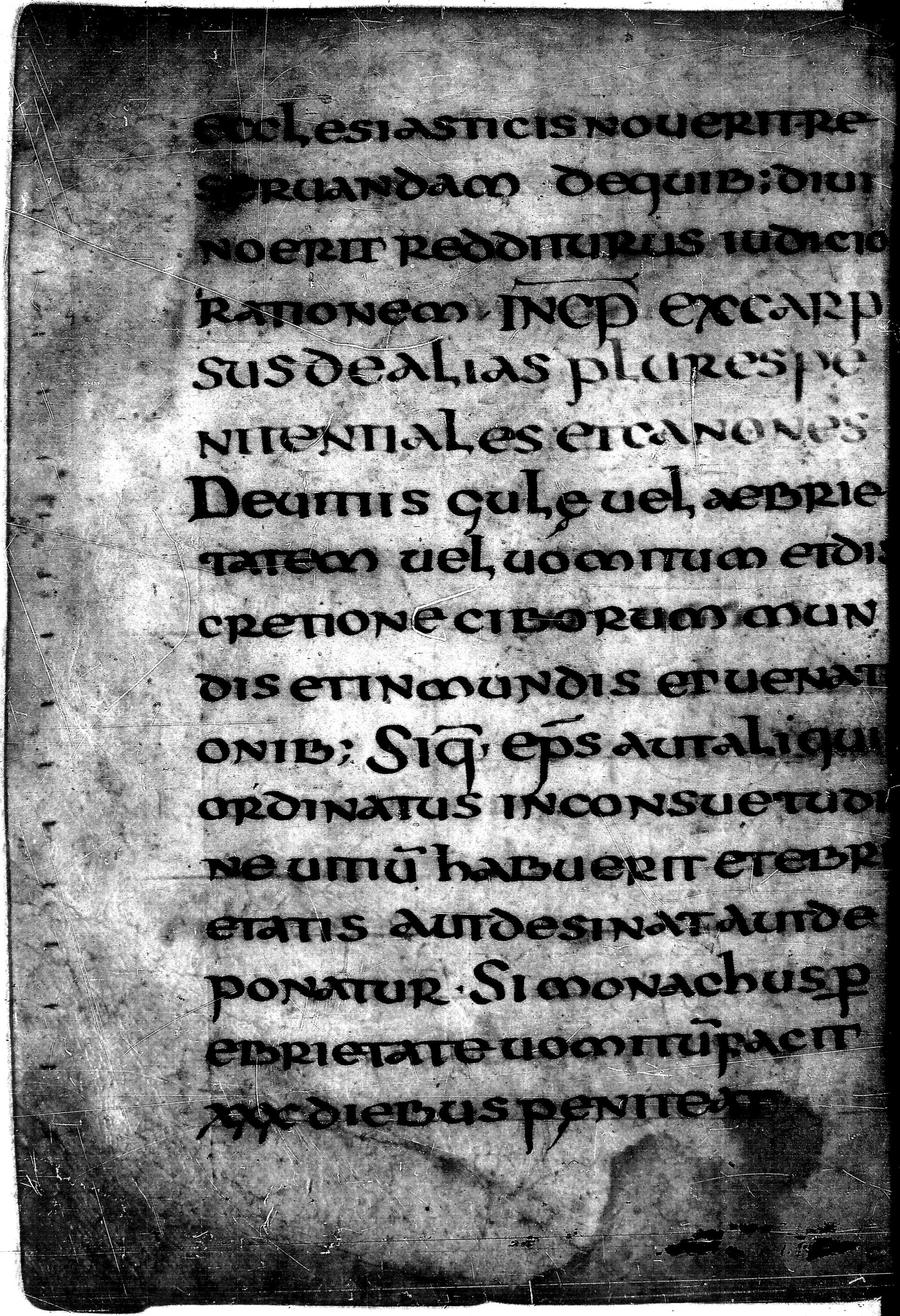
- Folio 1v of the Copenhagen manuscript Ny Kgl. Sam. 58 (8°), the oldest extant witness to the Excarpsus Cummeani
- Also known as: Pseudo-Cummean
- Language: medieval Latin
- Date: ca 740
- Genre: penitential
- Subject: church administration and discipline; ecclesiastical and lay penance

The Excarpsus Cummeani, also called the Pseudo-Cummeani, is an eighth-century penitential, probably written in the north of the Frankish Empire in Corbie Abbey. Twenty-six copies of the manuscript survive; six of those were copied before 800 CE. It is possible that the penitential, which extends its scope beyond monasticism to include clerics and lay people, has a connection to Saint Boniface and his efforts to reform the Frankish church in the first half of the eighth century. Geographic spread by the end of the eighth century and continued copying of the manuscript into the 9th and 10th centuries have been interpreted to mean the work was considered "by the Christian authorities" a canonical text. It was used as late as the eleventh century, "as the main source of the P. Parisiense compositum.

== Genesis and authorship ==
A penitential is a set of church rules concerning the Christian sacrament of penance; such sets were first developed by Celtic monks in Ireland in the sixth century AD. Unofficial handbooks compiled by monks were authorized by bishops, with the aim of enforcing uniform disciplinary standards within a given district. Notable early Irish penitentials were written by Finnian of Moville and his pupil Columbanus. The practice soon spread to the Anglo-Saxon church and reached the Continent in the eighth and ninth centuries.

The Excarpsus Cummeani derives its name from the association with the so-called Penitential of Cummean (c. 650), a series of "'iudicia', or decisions, on matters of penance, attributed to an Irish abbot named Cummean or Cominianus".

Though the Excarpsus is not a Roman penitential, it references one—in fact, however, it cites not a Roman text but the Paenitentiale Theodori (attributed to Theodore of Canterbury), possibly to enhance its status: Theodore, a Greek and originally a Mediterranean monk before he became the eighth Archbishop of Canterbury, took twenty years of knowledge of Roman church and penitential traditions with him when he was sent to Canterbury. Rob Meens refers to the Excarpsus as a "tripartite penitential", since it "draw[s] upon three traditions: Irish, Anglo-Saxon, and Frankish".

== Corbie and Boniface ==
Part 3.1 of the Excarpsus is derived from a collection of canonical judgments called the Iudicium Canonicum, to which are added penances for lay people, subdeacons, and bishops. This expansion meant that the penitential could be used for clerics and lay people as well as monks. Ludger Körntgen argues that such a penitential, which indicates a desire for stricter and practical guidelines especially for clerics, fits well with the kind of reform proposed by Saint Boniface, who had complained in his correspondence (letter from Pope Zachary, 5 November 744) about how the pallium was bestowed—a matter taken up in the Excarpsus as well as in the Vetus Gallica, which also derives from Corbie. Additional proof for the connection and the role of the penitential in the reform of the Frankish church is provided by the abbot of Corbie: most scholars agree that this abbot, Grimo, is the same Grimo appointed by Boniface as Archbishop of Rouen in 744.

== Related texts ==
Related texts include a revision of the Collectio Vetus Gallica and the Rheims Penitential.
