= Synodicon Vetus =

The Synodicon Vetus, also called Libellus Synodicus, is an anonymous, pseudo-historical book about early Christianity, written in the 9th century AD but largely based on earlier Greek sources. It contains information on synods and ecumenical councils from the first century up through the year 887.

== Contents ==
Each chapter records the history of one single ecumenical council, and contains information digested from earlier sources such as the Historia Ecclesiastica of Eusebius, and the work of the same name by Socrates of Constantinople. There are also myriad very specific details that do not appear in any other historical work - such as the number of bishops who attended any given council - that some scholars have suggested are inventions of the author's imagination rather than fact. Likewise, it has been suggested that some synods or councils recorded in the Synodicon Vetus did not even happen.

The Synodicon Vetus is also the earliest source that asserts the canonical books of the Bible were decided at the First Council of Nicaea. French Enlightenment writer Voltaire popularized the idea in the 18th century, and Christian radical Robert Taylor revived it in the 19th, but all instances of this assertion seem to trace back to the Synodicon Vetus, which relates:

The canonical and apocryphal books it distinguished in the following manner: in the house of God the books were placed down by the holy altar; then the council asked the Lord in prayer that the inspired works be found on top and the spurious on the bottom.

Modern scholars reject this notion and deem the development of the Christian biblical canon nearly complete (with exceptions known as the Antilegomena, written texts whose authenticity or value is disputed) by the time the Muratorian fragment was written.

== History ==
The Synodicon Vetus is presumed to have been written soon after its last recorded ecumenical council, at the end of the 9th or beginning of the 10th century, between 887 and 920, but most likely at the end of the 9th century.

It circulated for centuries in handwritten copies, and was first printed in 1601, produced by theologian Johannes Pappus, who worked from a shortened version he obtained from the prolific scribe and bookseller Andreas Darmarios, who was said to have brought an original manuscript out of the Morea. Darmarios had somewhat of a questionable reputation that has led some scholars to blame him for the introduction of various errors and supposed fabrications to the work.

It is published complete, both in Greek and Latin, in the Bibliotheca Graeca of Johann Albert Fabricius. It is also published entire in the Bibliotheca juris canon veteris of Christophe Justel and Guillaume Voël (using the Latinized names "C. Justellus" and "G. Voellus"), and in the Conciliorum Collectio of Jean Hardouin. Giovanni Domenico Mansi, in his collection "Sacrorum conciliorum nova et amplissima collectio", included this work under the name Libellus Synodicus, but he separated its various parts, distributing them throughout his work under the various councils to which they pertained.

There are two major versions of this work in manuscript form today, named "g" and "b", depending on which branch of the tradition they are from.

== Criticism ==
The work holds a dubious reputation among scholars. Some consider it to have important information not recorded elsewhere, while others consider it to be a confused jumble of misinformation. The more charitable critics have called it "mediocre", while others describe it as "inaccurate, unreliable, generally untrustworthy, and teeming with errors". Still others, while acknowledging the factual shortcomings of the text, rate it as being a valuable document of the eastern Christian perspective on western Christianity. The Synodicon Vetus for example ignores western synods that occurred after the year 400 or so, and the popes are spoken of with respect and reverence.
