= Penitential of Cummean =

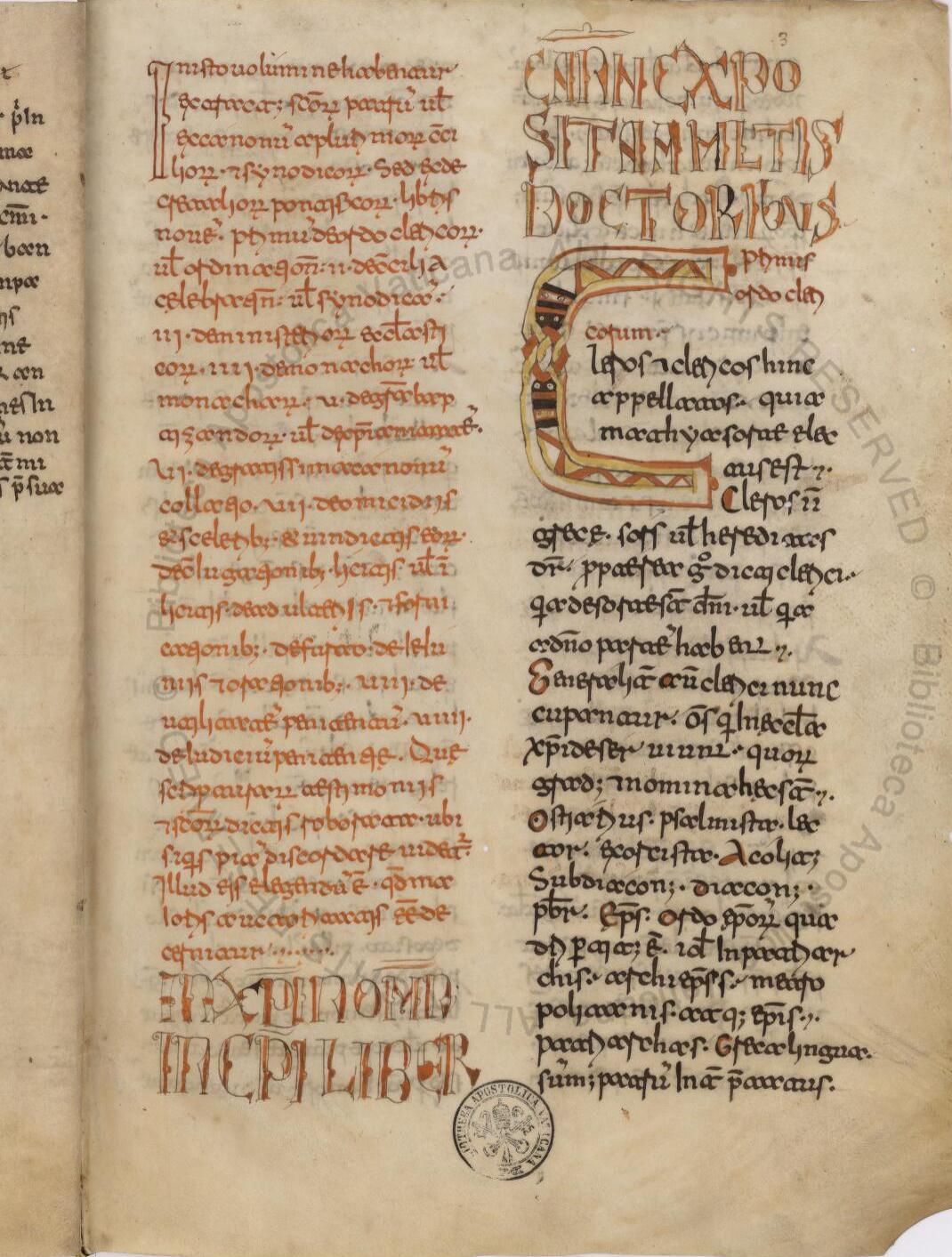
Codex Vat. 1349

The Penitential of Cummean is an Irish penitential, presumably composed c. 650 by an Irish monk named Cummean (or Cominianus). It served as a type of handbook for confessors.

== Manuscripts ==
Of the remaining manuscript versions, notable are Codex Vat. Pal. Lat. 485, written in the ninth century in Irish-influenced Lorsch Abbey (in modern-day Germany), and Codex Vat. 1349. Although Codex Vat. Pal. Lat. 485 was written in Lorsch, J. Zettinger believed that the book was compiled about the middle of the seventh century in either Scotland or Ireland.

The precise identification of Cummean is fraught with difficulties. The prologue of Codex Vat. 1349 shows an ascription to “Cumianus Longus” (Cummean Fada/ Cumean the Long). Cummean Fada, who lived about 592-662 A.D., was the son of King Fiachna of West Munster, and founded the monastery of Kilcummin. He may also be the Cummean of St. Brendan's foundation of Clonfert. One possible identification is with a bishop Cummean who retired to Bobbio Abbey (in modern-day Italy) between 711 and 744. The later Excarpsus cummeani, or Pseudo-Cummeani, is named such in reference to the penitential of Cummean.

== Content ==
The penitential follows the scheme of vices set up by John Cassian (c. 360 – 435) in his De institutis coenobiorum. A preface includes a homily on the "twelve remissions of sins", based on early patristic sources.

=== Example ===
Of Gluttony: "He who compels anyone, for the sake of good fellowship, to become drunk, shall do penance in the same manner as one who is drunk. ..."
