= Women in the patristic age =

The status of women in the patristic age, as defined by the Church Fathers, is a contentious issue within Christianity. While many believe that the patristic writers sought to restrict the influence of women in civil society as well as in the life of the Church, others believe that the early fathers actually tried to increase the dignity of women.

The Patristic era, which extends roughly from 100 AD to 500 AD, is claimed to be harsher than the Middle Ages in attributing social roles to women.

== Anthropological perspectives ==
=== Aristotle's views on women ===
Aristotle believed that women are colder than men and thus a lower form of life. His assumption carried forward unexamined to Galen and others until the 16th century.

=== Male activity and female passivity ===
Some believe that the Church Fathers' views were drawn in part from the views of the classical Greeks and Romans. In the classical age, which shaped patristic views, male sexuality and power were closely associated, and female sexuality was associated with passivity. To take one's pleasure was to be virile, to accept it servile.

However, many Christians point out that the Fathers believed strongly in the dignity of women, especially when compared to the broader cultures of antiquity. The teaching of the most enlightened fathers was to the effect that there was no natural inferiority in the woman to the man. Theodoret (Grcee. Affect. Curat. book 5) insists emphatically on their exact equality and says that God made a woman from a man so that the tendencies and actions of both might be harmonious. Sometimes, indeed, he observes, a woman has been found superior to a man in encountering adversity (Migne, 83:836).

John Chrysostom (Hoern. 61:3) says that no one is more fit to instruct and exhort her husband than a pious woman. This conception differed materially from that of Plato (Repub. 5:455) in that while the Greek philosopher sought to obliterate the ordinary distinctions between the sexes, the Christian father held that nature assigned to the woman her unique and distinct province of activity.

Chrysostom gives us a comparison between the duties of the wife and those of the husband, the former being represented as, in some respects, the more dignified; for while the husband is described as engaged in the rougher work of life, in the market or the law-courts, the wife is represented as remaining at home and devoting much of her time to prayer and to reading the Scriptures, καὶ τῇ ἄλλῃ φιλοσοφίᾷ.

When her husband returns, harassed with his labors, it is her function to cheer and to soothe him. This enables him to go forth into the world purified from the evil influences to which he has there been exposed, and carrying with him the higher influences of his home-life (In Joann. Hom. 61; Migne, 59:340)."

== Ecclesiastical roles ==
Throughout the Patristic age, women held a variety of positions in Church office and performed ecclesiastical duties. Despite recurrent opposition of women in office by various Councils and Church fathers like Tertullian, women were influential in shaping the hierarchy of Christianity.

By the end of the 6th century, the Church officially recognized three orders of women: deaconesses, widows and virgins. The surviving evidence also suggests the existence of female presbyters and even bishops, the extent of which is unclear because of the scarcity of remaining records.

=== Deaconesses ===
In the Eastern Church, women were being ordained as deaconesses from the 3rd century to at least the 7th century, from Armenia to Gaul. By the 3rd century, the office of deaconess was well attested by the Didascalia Apostolorum. The office was further classified in the Council of Nicaea as well as the Apostolic Constitutions of the 4th century in which the ordination ceremony for the deaconess is outlined, confirming its place as an order supported by the Church. Evidence for female deacons in the West emerges in the 5th century but few inscriptions survive as a result of several synods’ efforts to eliminate them.

The female diaconate in the West certainly existed, though was not widely accepted. Moreover, it was subject to local interpretations and was often confused with the order of widows. Although the role of the deaconess was liturgical in nature, it remained limited to duties considered improper for a male to perform, such as instructing women, assisting women in disrobing and anointing their body in the holy rite of baptism.

=== Widows and Virgins ===
By the early 3rd century, the qualification for the office of widows was well established and its duties were clearly outlined in various Church Orders. Some inscriptions, such as The Apostolic Tradition reveal that widows were to be ecclesiastically enrolled, but not ordained. Others, like the Testamentum Domini explicitly state that widows were to have an ordained office, with duties surpassing the usual service of prayer.

Regardless of the status they were granted, the Church irrefutably held widows in high esteem. In contrast, virgins were not considered church offices, nor were they appointed by ordination. In some areas however, they were considered members of the clergy and part of the ecclesiastical order, like those of Tertullian’s Carthage and other African congregations.

=== Presbyters ===
Repeated attempts were made by councils to eliminate the order of female presbyters. Their existence, albeit small in quantity, is indicated through epigraphical and literary evidence. Documented incidences of female presbyters are limited, with records suggesting they were most common in the Montanist movement in the East and the Priscillianist movement in the West. Although both movements were later deemed heretical, evidence also exists to support the presence of female presbyters within the "orthodox" Church

A letter from Pope Gelasius from the end of the 5th century acknowledges their sacerdotal duties in Southern Italy and Sicily, whose communities and bishops evidently accepted these positions. Some argue that perhaps their governing role in communities as presbyters assigned women the authority to teach and exercise sacramental and liturgical functions. Nevertheless, the precise responsibilities of female presbyters remains largely unclear.

=== Bishops ===
The early Church largely succeeded in excluding women from this office. Despite this, some Christian groups like the Montanists did appoint women as bishops. Latin inscriptions from Italy and Dalmatia certainly suggest their presence there as bishops in the 5th and 6th centuries. As a result of sparse epigraphical evidence, it is arguable whether women exercised the role of bishop in other areas and Christian groups.

== Image of women as seen by theologians ==
=== Woman with the same intelligence ===
For lawyer and apologist Minucius Felix, women are born with the same capacity as men, among other things.

The Catechetical School of Alexandria, in the 200s AD had courses for both men and women, also using virtuous women in elegant writing.

Clement of Alexandria cites women philosophers, such as Themista of Lampsacus, Leontion along with Judith and Esther as examples of wise women.

For the apologist Lactantius women have to be equally educated in philosophy, although he belittles Plato for his vision of opening the door to women in political leadership.

For bishop Eusebius both woman and man have the same natural aptitude for the guardianship of the State, and also admits in divine instruction and philosophy all classes of people, not only men, but also women, and not only free men and slaves, but also barbarians and Greeks.

=== Image of God ===
In the patristic age many catholic theologians (according to Augustine) denied that women are also the Image of God, something that Augustine of Hippo, Basil the Great, Gregory of Nyssa, Gregory the Theologian, Severian of Gabala among others, refuted, although with various justifications.

=== Relationship in a marriage ===
Gregory the Theologian wrote a poem to a young wife that reads as follows:

You must respect him and love him unconditionally, as you love God. Be aware that you are a woman and have an essential and significant purpose and destiny; however, your purpose and destiny differ from that of your husband, who must be the head of your household. Set aside the silliness of equality among the sexes that some of your contemporaries preach and attempt to comprehend the obligations of marriage. In the realization of these obligations, you will discover the incredible patience and endurance that is necessary to fulfill your family duties; it is in this manner that you will also find the great strength that you, as a woman, possess. You must surely be aware of how easily anger overtakes men. They cannot maintain, and they often appear as wild lions. It is at this exact moment that a woman must remain stronger and display her superiority. You must play the role of the lion-tamer. What does a lion-tamer do when the beast starts roaring? He becomes even calmer than usual, and through kindness and persistence, he overcomes his wrath. He speaks to him kindly, in a soft but firm voice; he caresses it, he attends to it, he puts it, and gradually, calmness is restored.

=== Woman as the root of all evil ===
Tertullian's views on women went further: "The curse God pronounced on your sex still weighs on the world. ...You are the devil's gateway.... You are the first that deserted the divine laws. All too easily you destroyed the image of God, Eve. Because you deserved death, it was the son of God who had to die".

St Jerome, the well known Biblical scholar and translator of the Bible into Latin (the Vulgate), like most early Christian theologians, Jerome glorified virginity and looked down on marriage. His reasoning was also rooted in Genesis: "Eve in paradise was a virgin ... understand that virginity is natural and that marriage comes after the Fall." According to Philip Vivian, Jerome's view was also characterized as blaming them for the fall, saying "woman is the root of all evil."

Firmilian tells of a woman who went into an ecstasy and came out a prophetess. "That woman who first through marvels or deceptions of the demons did many things to deceive the faithful, among other things... she dared to do this, namely that by an impressive invocation she feigned she was sanctifying bread, and offering a sacrifice to the Lord."

=== Women as the weaker sex ===
John Chrysostom, bishop of Constantinople at the beginning of the 5th century, said of biblical women that they "were great characters, great women and admirable.... Yet did they in no case outstrip the men, but occupied the second rank" (Epistle to the Ephesians, Homily 13). Commenting on 1 Timothy 2:11–15,

Chrysostom said that "the male sex enjoyed the higher honor. Man was first formed; and elsewhere he shows their superiority.... He wishes the man to have the preeminence in every way." Of women he said that "The woman taught once, and ruined all. On this account therefore he said, let her not teach. But what is it to other women, that she suffered this? It certainly concerns them; for the sex is weak and fickle, and he is speaking of the sex collectively." (1 Timothy, Homily 9).

Augustine may have elevated the contempt of women and sex in some his writings. To him, women's inferiority to men was so obvious that he felt that he had to ask the question: "Why was woman created at all". He concluded that woman was created purely for procreation and for nothing else. The expulsion of Adam and Eve from paradise, according to him, was purely the fault of Eve.

=== Women as creatures of lust ===
Origen does not approve of the sexual act even in marriage and taught that although widowers can remarry, they are by no means crowned for this. He also argued in his commentary on 1 Corinthians 14:34–35 that female prophets never spoke publicly in the assembly. According to this theologian, women were characterized as continuously full of lust.

== Specific prohibitions against female demands ==
=== Council of Elvira ===
The c. 4th century council of Elvira made some canons (church law) restricting women concerning divorce, adultery and abortion:

- Canon 8: Women who have left their husbands for no prior cause and have joined themselves with others, may not even at death receive communion.
- Canon 9: A woman of the faith who has left an adulterous husband of the faith and marries another, her marrying in this manner is prohibited. If she has so married, she may not at any more receive communion—unless he that she has left has since departed from this world.
- Canon 63: If a woman conceives in adultery and then has an abortion, she may not commune again, even as death approaches, because she has sinned twice.

=== Infanticide ===
In his First Apology Justin Martyr cautioned that it was wicked to dispose of children through exposure to the elements, given that almost all those who are exposed were raised to prostitution.

=== Prostitution ===
Justin also added a warning against consorting with prostitutes because it was possible that one "may possibly be having intercourse with his own child, or relative, or brother" unknowingly, due to the practice of infant exposure.

== Gender violence ==
Eastern legislation was somewhat more considered from the 5th–6th centuries, since it recognized the possibility for married wives to divorce and even to obtain financial compensation from their husbands for beating them. In some Egyptian papyri dating from that period we can see that fines or penalties were imposed on the abusive husband.

== Women in heretical movements ==
A number of minority movements, deemed heretical by the wider church, gave a more prominent place to the ministry of women and in some cases allowed them to participate in the priestly ministry. These include Montanism in the 2nd and 3rd century, the Quintillians and Collyridians in the 4th century, Priscillianism in the 4th century, and the Waldensians in the medieval period. These heretical sects provided occasion for the institutional church to condemn the ecclesiastical ministry of women. Although the gnostics of the Gospel of Thomas promoted a misogynistic view.

== See also ==
- List of Christian women of the patristic age
- Religion and sexuality § Christianity (see "Patristic Period" within Historical Background)
- Patristics
- Women in Christianity § Patristic age
- Women in Church history § Patristic age
