= Orthodox Tewahedo biblical canon =

Biblical canon used by Ethiopian and Eritrean Orthodox Tewahedo churches

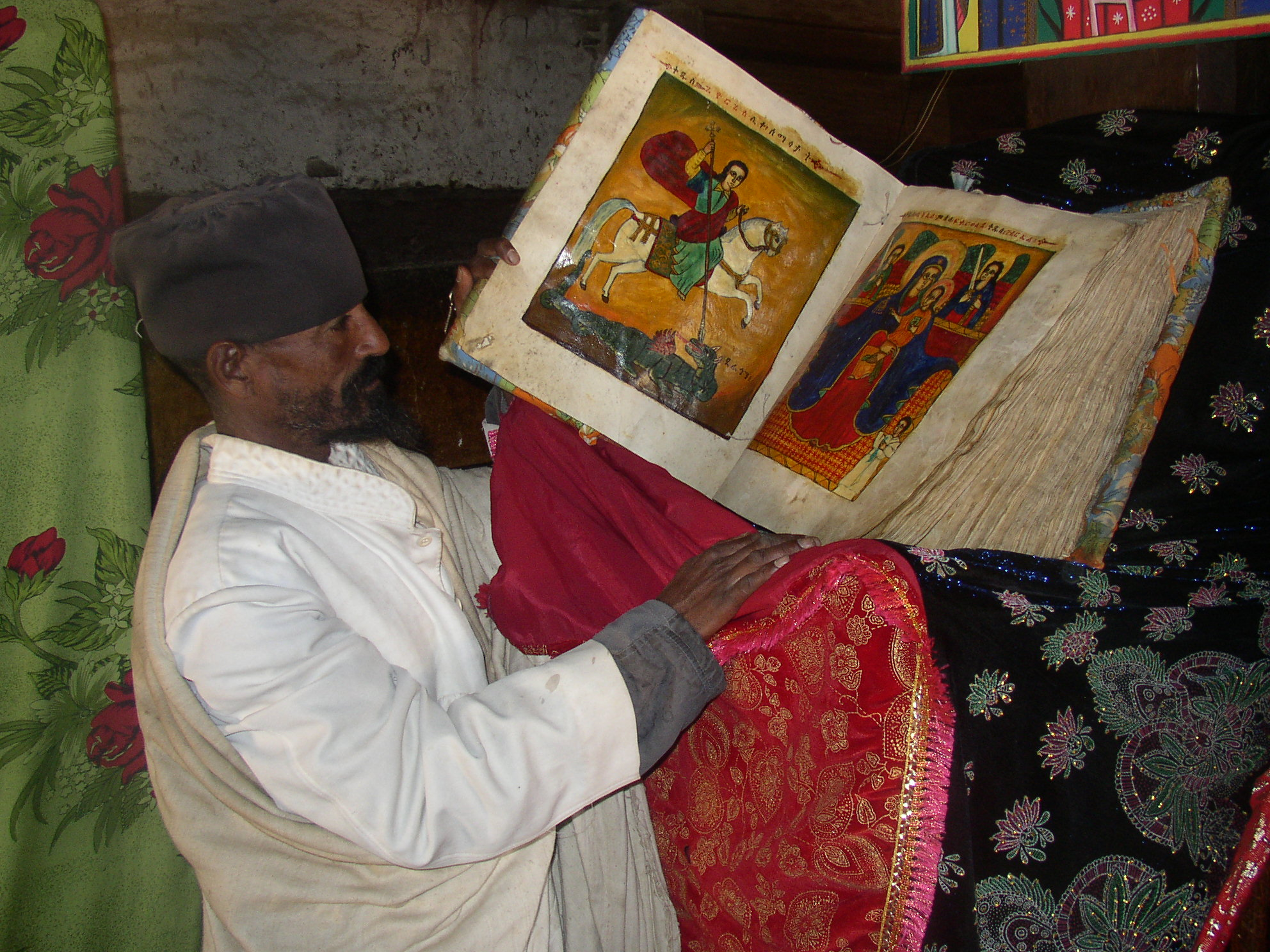
Ethiopian Orthodox monk from Debre Damo Monastery with an illuminated Bible

The Orthodox Tewahedo biblical canon is a version of the Christian Bible used in the two Oriental Orthodox churches of the Ethiopian and Eritrean traditions: the Ethiopian Orthodox Tewahedo Church and the Eritrean Orthodox Tewahedo Church. At 81 books, it is the largest and most varied biblical canon in traditional Christendom.

Western scholars have classified the books of the canon into two categories—the narrower canon, which consists mostly of books familiar to the West, and the broader canon, which includes nine additional books.

It is not known to exist at this time as one published compilation. Some books, though considered canonical, are nonetheless difficult to locate and are not even widely available in the churches' home countries of Ethiopia and Eritrea.

== Narrower canon ==
=== Old Testament ===
The Orthodox Tewahedo narrower Old Testament canon contains the entire established Hebrew protocanon. Moreover, with the exception of the first two books of Maccabees, the Orthodox Tewahedo canon also contains the entire Catholic deuterocanon. In addition to this, the Orthodox Tewahedo Old Testament includes the Prayer of Manasseh, 3 Ezra, and 4 Ezra, which also appear in the canons of other Christian traditions. Unique to the Orthodox Tewahedo canon are the Paralipomena of Jeremiah (4 Baruch), Jubilees, Enoch, and the three books of Meqabyan.

The canon includes not only the Book of Baruch (with the Letter of Jeremiah) but also 4 Baruch. Additionally, the 1st, 2nd and 3rd Books of Ethiopian Maccabees (Meqabyan) are also part of the canon; while they share a common name they are completely different from the books of Maccabees that are known or have been canonized in other traditions. Finally, within the Orthodox Tewahedo tradition, 3 Ezra is called Second Ezra, 4 Ezra is called Ezra Sutu'el, and the Prayer of Manasseh is incorporated into the Second Book of Chronicles.

=== New Testament ===
The Orthodox Tewahedo narrower canon includes all of the 27 books of the New Testament.

== Broader canon ==
The broader canon adds to the 81 books of the Tewahedo bible the following:

- Josippon (1 book)
- Sinodos (4 books)
- Books of Covenant (2 books)
- Ethiopic Clement (1 book)
  An epistle traditionally attributed as written by the apostle Peter to Clement. It should not be confused with 1 Clement or 2 Clement.
- Didascalia (Didesqelya) (1 book)
  A book of Church order in 43 chapters, distinct from the Didascalia Apostolorum, but similar to books I–VII of the Apostolic Constitutions, where it most likely originates.

The broader canon seems to have been created by Ethiopian scholars commenting on the Fetha Negest law code, which says that the canon contains 81 books, but lists only 73. The additional eight books were those presumed to be missing from the list.

== List of books in the Orthodox Tewahedo Bible ==
=== In the Old Testament ===
List of Old Testament books in the Orthodox Tewahedo Bible:

1. Genesis
2. Exodus
3. Leviticus
4. Numbers
5. Deuteronomy
6. Joshua
7. Judges
8. Ruth
9. I Samuel
10. II Samuel
11. I Kings
12. II Kings
13. I Chronicles
14. II Chronicles
15. Book of Jubilees
16. Book of Enoch
17. 1 Izra (Ezra)
18. Nehemiah
19. 3 Izra (Greek Esdras)
20. Izra Sutuel ("Ezra Shealtiel", ie 4 Ezra)
21. Tobit
22. Judith
23. Esther
24. 1 Meqabyan
25. 2 Meqabyan
26. 3 Meqabyan (sometimes called Ethiopian Maccabees, but not the same as the four Greek Books of the Maccabees)
27. Job
28. Psalms
29. Messale (Proverbs ch 1–24)
30. Tagsas (Proverbs ch 25–31)
31. Wisdom of Solomon
32. Ecclesiastes
33. Song of Songs
34. Sirach
35. Isaiah
36. Jeremiah
37. Baruch
38. Lamentations
39. Terefermias (Letter of Jeremiah)
40. Teref Baruch (4 Baruch)
41. Ezekiel
42. Daniel
43. Hosea
44. Amos
45. Micah
46. Joel
47. Obadiah
48. Jonah
49. Nahum
50. Habakkuk
51. Zephaniah
52. Haggai
53. Zechariah
54. Malachi

=== In the New Testament ===
List of New Testament books in the Orthodox Tewahedo Bible.

1. Matthew
2. Mark
3. Luke
4. John
5. Acts
6. Romans
7. 1 Corinthians
8. 2 Corinthians
9. Galatians
10. Ephesians
11. Philippians
12. Colossians
13. 1 Thessalonians
14. 2 Thessalonians
15. 1 Timothy
16. 2 Timothy
17. Titus
18. Philemon
19. Hebrews
20. 1 Peter
21. 2 Peter
22. 1 John
23. 2 John
24. 3 John
25. James
26. Jude
27. Revelation

=== In the Church Order ===
List of Church Order books that are part of the broader canon:

1. Sinodos
  - Ser'ata Seyon (30 canons)
  - Te'ezaz (71 canons)
  - Gessew (56 canons)
  - Abtelis (81 canons)
2. 1 Covenant
3. 2 Covenant
4. Ethiopic Clement
5. Didascalia
6. Josippon

== See also ==
- Aksumite Collection, a Ge'ez manuscript with liturgical and canon law texts
- Book of the Cock, a work sometimes used by Ethiopian Christians
- Fetha Negest, a legal code used by Ethiopian Christians
- Kebra Nagast, an Ethiopian national epic

== Footnotes ==
Broader Canon
Preceded by Bible: Revelation	Bible; Books of the Bible	End
