= Bruno Steimer =

German historian

Bruno Steimer (born July 5, 1959) is a German historian of Christianity, especially early Christianity in the Roman era.

== Biography ==
Bruno Steimer was born July 5, 1959, in Saarland, West Germany. He graduated high school from Arnold-Janssen-Gymnasium St. Wendel. He studied Catholic theology and history, obtaining his degree in 1986. In 1991, Steimer received his doctorate from the University of Regensburg. His advisor was Norbert Brox. After graduation, Steimer has worked at Verlag Herder and its American imprint Crossroad Publishing Company, a book publishing company that focuses on Catholic literature. Notably, he was editor of the third edition of Lexikon für Theologie und Kirche from 1994–2001, working with Walter Kasper.

== Work ==
Steimer's most significant scholarly work was his doctoral dissertation, Vertex traditionis: die Gattung der altchristlichen Kirchenordnungen. It examines the ancient church orders, a series of pseudepigraphic works purportedly written by Jesus's apostles but actually written centuries later, that laid down strictures and guidelines for the organization of the early Christian church.

Vertex traditionis received some scholarly debate. Georg Schöllgen wrote a journal article, Der Abfassungszweck der frühen Kirchenordnungen. Anmerkungen zu den Thesen Bruno Steimers, quibbling with some of Steimer's conclusions. In particular, Steimer writes that many of the early ancient church orders were clarifying and systemizing what was already common practice within the community, and thus their strictures are useful as a direct guide to early Christian practices. For the Didache, Didascalia Apostolorum, and Apostolic Tradition, Schöllgen argues that if they were truly descriptive of the normal state of Christian communities, there would be no need to use the forged authority of the apostles as claimed authors. The works already describe a church that should be very deferential to its bishops, so why not simply state its teachings according to the authority of these known leaders? Rather, to Schöllgen, these earlier church orders were prescriptive, outlining how the author felt the church should be organized, but apparently was not organized as such at the time. Bart Ehrman also commented on the debate, and favored Schöllgen's stance over Steimer's.
