= Ancient church orders =

Christian literary genre, 1st-5th centuries

The ancient church orders form a genre of early Christian literature, ranging from 1st to 5th century, which has the purpose of offering authoritative "apostolic" prescriptions on matters of moral conduct, liturgy and Church organization. These texts are extremely important in the study of early liturgy and served as the basis for much ancient ecclesiastical legislation.

A characteristic of this genre is their pseudepigraphic form. Many of them profess to have been handed down by the Twelve Apostles, in some cases purporting to have been gathered by Clement of Rome or by Hippolytus of Rome. In the earliest of them, the Didache, extends to the title: The teaching of the Lord to the Gentiles by the Twelve Apostles. The later Testamentum Domini declares itself to be the legacy left by Jesus Christ himself to his Apostles before the Ascension, and to give his own words and commands as to the government of the Church. Apart from the Apostolic Constitutions, which was printed before 1563, all other texts have been discovered and published in the 19th or early 20th century.

== Texts and their relationship ==
Church orders were mutually interrelated documents and often circulated in collections. It is easy to point out many direct literal relationships among sections of them. Different scholars since the early 20th century have suggested extremely different historical orders of interrelation. Nowadays the usually accepted family tree contains different roots, and can be so summarized according to Bradshaw:

- Didache, or Teaching of the Twelve Apostles, (1st-2nd century, Syria), from which depend
  - Didascalia Apostolorum (about 230 AD, Syria)
  - Apostolic Church-Ordinance, or Apostolic Church-Order, (about 300 AD, Egypt)
- Apostolic Tradition (3rd or 4th century, probably Syria), published in the 19th century under the title of Egyptian Church Order, from which depend
  - Canons of Hippolytus (336-340 AD, Egypt)
  - Testamentum Domini (?5th century, Syria)
  - Epitome of the eighth Book of the Apostolic Constitutions, or The Constitutions through Hippolytus
- Canons of the Apostles, which first appeared as the last chapter of the eighth book of the Apostolic Constitution, shall be considered as a special form of the genre

There are other minor texts belonging to the genre of the ancient church orders: the Coptic Canons of Basil (an Egyptian 4th-century text based mainly on the Canons of Hippolytus) and the Western Statuta Eccesiae Antiqua (about 490 AD, probably composed by Gennadius of Massilia and based on both Apostolic Tradition and Apostolic Constitutions).

The church orders were usually transmitted in collections with the same order of materials, even if sometimes free rendered and mixed with additional material. The more ancient collection is formed by Didascalia - Didache - Apostolic Tradition. Later the Apostolic Church-Ordinance took the place of the Didache in the second position and in even later manuscripts the Testamentum Domini took the place of the Didascalia in the first position and the book 8 of the Apostolic Constitutions took the place of the Apostolic Tradition in the last position, thus we find Testamentum Domini - Apostolic Church-Ordinance - book 8 of the Apostolic Constitutions.

The main collections of church orders are the following:

- the Apostolic Constitutions (about 380 AD, Syria) is a collection of eight books depending mainly from the Didascalia Apostolorum (books 1–6), from the Didache (book 7) and from the Apostolic Tradition (book 8). The seventh and eighth books of the Apostolic Constitutions include so much additional material that they can be considered as separated stand-alone texts. The final chapter of the eighth book is known as the Canons of the Apostles and had a wider circulation than the rest of the Apostolic Constitutions
- the Verona Palimpsest, or Fragmentum Veronese, first published in 1900 by Edmund Hauler, contains Latin free and incomplete versions of the Didascalia Apostolorum, Apostolic Church-Ordinance and the Egyptian Church Order
- the Alexandrine Sinodos is extant in Ge'ez, Bohairic Coptic, Sahidic Coptic and Arabic versions and is a collection based on the Apostolic Church-Ordinance, the Apostolic Tradition and the eighth book of the Apostolic Constitutions. It was particularly used in the ancient Coptic and Ethiopian Christianity. The Bohairic version was published in 1848 by Henry Tattam and the Sahidic text was published in 1883 by Paul de Lagarde
- the Clementine Octateuch is extant in Syriac, Bohairic Coptic and Arabic versions, and it is a collection based on the Testamentum Domini, the Apostolic Church-Ordinance, the Apostolic Tradition (included only in the Arabic version) and the eighth book of the Apostolic Constitutions. It was particularly used in the ancient Oriental Orthodoxy and Church of the East.

== Living literature ==
To indicate the way of development of the ancient church orders the term "living literature" has been proposed by Bruce M. Metzger and Paul F. Bradshaw (and others) in order to note that these texts, of which only a part survived, were updated and amended generation after generation, mixing ancient parts with materials from the contemporary uses and tradition of the copyists and removing what was no more in line with the current understanding. Moreover, it is probable also that in many cases the copyists were not describing their current or more ancient uses, but what they considered to be the best practice.

It is possible to outline also some development patterns for the content of this literature: the more ancient texts, such as Didache, are mainly concerned about moral conduct, giving very little room to liturgy and to Church organization. Later on the interest in moral issues waned and liturgy became prominent. In the last documents, the focus moved mainly on the Church organization and to the canon law. Starting since the 5th century, the ancient church orders ceased to be regarded as authoritative.

== See also ==
- Church order

== Sources ==
- Bradshaw, Paul F. (2002). The Search for the Origins of Christian Worship. Oxford University Press. ISBN 978-0-19-521732-2.
- Steimer, Bruno (1992). Vertex traditionis: die Gattung der altchristlichen Kirchenordnungen. Walter de Gruyter. ISBN 978-3-11-013460-5.
- Maclean, Arthur John (1910). The Ancient Church Orders. Cambridge University Press.
- Johnson, Lawrence J. (2009). Worship in the Early Church: An Anthology of Historical Sources. Vol 1. Liturgical Press. ISBN 978-0-8146-6197-0.
- Senn, Frank C (1997). Christian Liturgy, Catholic and Evangelical. Augsburg Fortress. p. 111. ISBN 0-8006-2726-1.
- Peterson, John Bertram (1907). "Apostolic Constitutions" . In Herbermann, Charles (ed.). Catholic Encyclopedia. Vol. 1. New York: Robert Appleton Company.
