= Alexandrine Sinodos =

5th-century compilation of church orders

The Alexandrine Sinodos, also called Clementine Heptateuch, is a Christian collection of Church Orders. This collection of earlier texts dates from the 4th or 5th century CE. The provenance is Egypt and it was particularly used in the ancient Coptic and Ethiopian Christianity.

== Manuscript tradition ==
The original text, which was probably written in Greek, is now lost. Translations in Geʽez, Bohairic Coptic, Sahidic Coptic and Arabic remain extant.

The Sahidic translation is found in British Museum manuscript or.1820, dated 1006, and was published in 1883 by Paul de Lagarde. A new edition was published in 1954 by Till and Leipoldt. The Sahidic version lacks some prayers found in other manuscripts.

The Arabic translation is complete and dates to before 1295 CE. It is found in Vaticanus manuscript ar.149, and was published in 1904 by George William Horner.

The Geʽez translation, which dates from the 13th century, is a complete copy of the original with additional interpolations. It is found in British Museum manuscript or.793, and was published in 1904 by George William Horner.

The Bohairic translation was made in 1804 from the Sahidic text, and was published in 1848 by Henry Tattam.

The more ancient translations are the Sahidic and Arabic versions (probably both coming through a common lost Sahidic version of about 500 CE). The Geʽez version is derived from the Arabic one.

== Content ==
The Alexandrine Sinodos is a collection of Church Orders, usually divided into seven books. It is so composed:

- Book 1 includes the Apostolic Church-Order
- Books 2 and 3 include the Egyptian Church Order (better known as Apostolic Tradition)
- Books 4 to 7 include the eighth book of the Apostolic Constitutions, without the last chapter (Canons of the Apostles) and without the liturgical prayers.

The numbering of the chapters is different in each version. The Sahidic and Bohairic versions divide the Apostolic Church-Order into 30 chapters, while the Arabic and Geʽez versions divide it into 20 chapters. The Sahidic and Bohairic versions have the Apostolic Tradition from chapters 31 to 62, while the Arabic and Geʽez versions from chapters 21 to 47.

== See also ==
- Aksumite Collection
- Apostolic Constitutions
- Verona Palimpsest
