= Henry Tattam =

British orientalist (1788–1868)

Henry Tattam (28 December 1789 – 8 January 1868, Stanford Rivers, Essex) was a Church of England clergyman and Coptic scholar.

== Life ==
Tattam was Rector of St Cuthbert's Bedford, 1822–1849, and from 1831 to 1849 also Rector of Great Woolstone, Buckinghamshire. He was Archdeacon of Bedford from 1845 to 1866, Rector of Stanford Rivers, Essex from 1849, and a Chaplain-in-Ordinary to the Queen from 1853.

== Works ==
Tattam was the author of various theological and philological works, including several editions and translations of Coptic texts. He was elected a Fellow of the Royal Society in 1835. Tattam visited Egypt and the Holy Land in 1838–9, meeting the patriarch and acquiring Coptic and Syriac manuscripts for the British Museum (manuscripts now in the British Library). He received honorary degrees from Trinity College Dublin, the University of Göttingen and the University of Leiden.

In 1848 Tattam published The Apostolical Constitutions, or Canons of the Apostles, which includes the so-called Alexandrine Sinodos (or Clementine Heptateuch) made of the Apostolic Church-Ordinance, the Egyptian Church Order and a free version of the eighth book of the Apostolic Constitutions.

== Works ==
- Helps to Devotion, 1825
- Compendious Grammar of the Egyptian Language, 1830
- A Defence of the Church of England Against the Attacks of a Roman Catholic Priest, 1843
- A Memoir of Her Grace the late Duchess of Bedford, 1858
- A Compendious Grammar of the Egyptian Language, 1863 (which was finally translated into Arabic by "Mina Saad Ibrahim" in 2010 under the title الشامل في قواعد اللغة القبطية )
