= Testamentum Domini =

5th-century Christian text; church order

Testamentum Domini ("Testament of Our Lord") is a Christian treatise which belongs to the genre of the ancient church orders. The work can be dated to about the 5th-century A.D. even if a 4th-century date is sometimes proposed. The provenience is regarded as Syria, even if also Egypt or Asia Minor are possible origins.

== Author and date ==
The author is unknown, even if the work declares to be the legacy left by Jesus Christ himself to his Apostles before the Ascension, and to give his own words and commands as to the government of the Church.

The late dating, to the 4th or more likely the 5th century A.D., may be discerned in the interpolations in the prayers, possibly in the reference to the chief deacon, for elsewhere no single deacon is distinguished by name until the close of the 4th century, in the reference to the Epiphany, which is first heard of elsewhere at the beginning of the 4th century. The suggestion has been hazarded that the last revision was due to the school of Apollinaris of Laodicea (died about 390 A.D.).

== Manuscript tradition ==
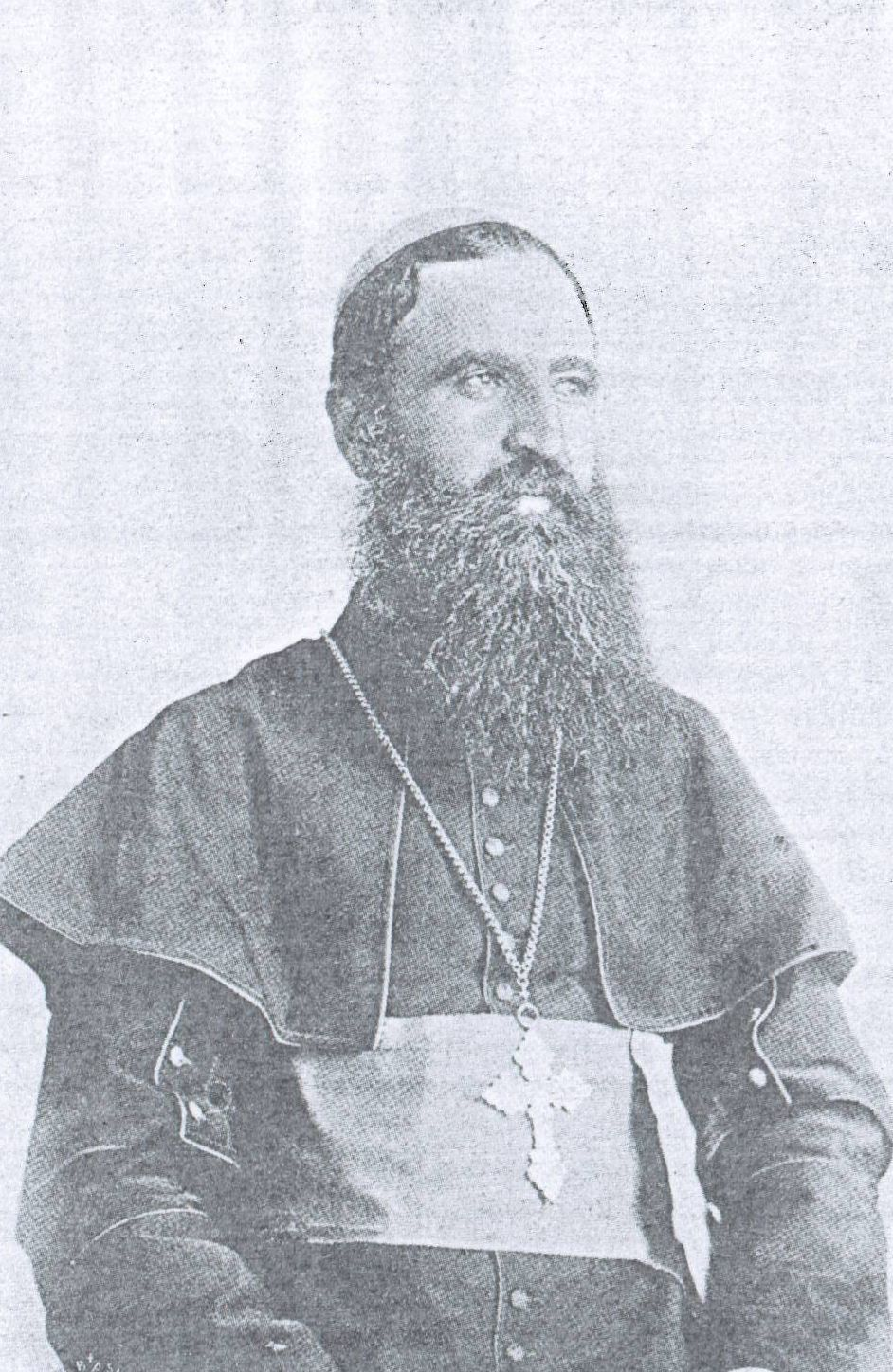
Patriarch Ephrem Rahmani, who first re-discovered the Testamentum Domini

The Testamentum was originally written in Greek, but this original is lost, although a small fragment was identified in 2011. Extracts were published by Paul de Lagarde in 1856, and a Latin fragment, edited by Montague Rhodes James, appeared in 1893.

The whole book was first published in Syriac in 1899, with a Latin translation by Ephrem Rahmani, the Syriac Catholic Patriarch of Antioch. His text is that of a 17th-century MS. at Mosul, the colophon of which says that the Syriac text was translated from the original Greek "a Jacobo paupere," evidently James of Edessa, in A.D. 687; but he makes use of other material, including an Arabic version made from a Coptic copy written in A.D. 927. The Mosul MS. contains the whole Bible in the Peshitto version, followed by the Syriac Clementine Octateuch. An English translation followed in 1902 by Cooper and Maclean.

A manuscript of a different family from the one used by Rahmani, the MS 8/11 of the Syriac Orthodox Patriarchate in Damascus dated 1204, was published in 1975 by Arthur Võõbus. In 1984 Robert Beylot published the first critical edition of the Ge'ez translation.

== Content ==
The Testamentum is usually incorporated in the collection of Church Orders named Clementine Octateuch. Of this the Testament forms the first two books; and according to the title it contains the "testament, or words which Our Lord spake to His holy Apostles when He rose from the dead". The division into books, however, is clearly not original.

It falls into three distinct parts: an apocalyptic introduction, a "church order" proper, and a conclusion of the same apocalyptic character as the introduction.

- The Introduction (book 1:1-18) professes to contain the record of the revelation of Himself by the Lord to his Apostles, with whom are Martha, Mary and Salome, on the evening after his resurrection. He is represented as unfolding to them, at their request, the signs of the end, and giving them instruction on various other topics. Incidentally, the fact becomes plain that this section is composed from the standpoint of Asia Minor and Syria, that it dates from soon after the time of Maximin (235-38) and Decius (249-51), and that it springs from a Christian community of a strictly morally rigorous type.
- The Church Order (book 1:19 – book 2:24) follows the general lines of the Canons of Hippolytus and similar documents. It describes the Church and its buildings (1:19); the office of the bishop and his functions (1:19-27) : the mystagogic instruction (1:28) common to this and the Arabic Didascalia, where it occurs in an earlier form, and based in part upon the Gnostic Acts of Peter; the presbyter (1:29-32); the deacon (1:33-38); confessors (1:39); the "widows who have precedence in sitting" (1:40-43), apparently the same persons who are spoken of elsewhere as "presbyteresses" (1:35,2:19); the subdeacon (1:44) and the reader (liturgy) (1:45), the order of whose offices seems to have been inverted; virgins of both sexes (1:46); and those who possess charismata or spiritual gifts (1:47). Next come the regulations for the laity, including the whole course of preparation for and admission to baptism (2:1-8), confirmation (2:9), and the Eucharist (2:10) after which there follows a series of miscellaneous regulations for Easter and Pentecost (2:11-12), the agape (2:13), the funds of the Church (2:17-20), the visitation of the sick (2:21), the use of psalmody (2:22), the burial of the dead (2:23), and the hours of prayer (2:24).
- The Conclusion (book 2:25-27) brings us back to the injunctions of the Lord as to the keeping of these precepts, a special charge to John, Andrew and Peter, and a statement that copies of the Testament were made by John, Peter and Matthew, and sent to Jerusalem by the hands of Dosithaeus, Sillas, Magnus and Aquila.

== Doctrine ==
There is much that is peculiar to the Testament or characteristic of it. First and foremost is its ascription to Jesus himself, which we can hardly be mistaken in regarding as an attempt to claim yet higher sanction than was claimed by the various compilations which were styled "apostolic", the so-called Church Orders. The whole tone of the treatise is one of highly-strung asceticism, and the regulations are such as point by their severity to a small and strictly organized body. They are "the wise", " the perfect", "sons of light"; but this somewhat Gnostic phraseology is not accompanied with any signs of Gnostic doctrine, and the work as a whole is orthodox in tone. They are set in the midst of "wolves", despised and slighted by the careless and worldly: there is frequent mention of "the persecuted," and of the duty of "bearing the cross" There appears to be no place for penitence for serious sins excepting in the case of catechumens, and there is a notable "perfectionist" tone in many of the prayers.

Charismata, and above all exorcisms, occupy a very important place: there is a vivid realization of the ministry of angels, and the angelic hierarchy is very complete. Great stress is laid upon virginity (although there is not a sign of monasticism), upon fasting (especially for the bishop), upon the regular attendance of the whole clerical body and the "more perfect" of the laity at the hours of prayer. The Church buildings are very elaborate, and the baptistery is oblong, a form found apparently only here and in the Arabic Didascalia. Amongst the festivals mentioned are the Epiphany, Easter and Pentecost.

With regard to the prayers, they are based upon forms common to this and other Church Orders, but have many lengthy interpolations of an inflated and rhapsodic kind. The bishop appears to rank far above the presbyters (more conspicuously so, for example, than in the Canons of Hippolytus), and the presbyters are still divided into two classes, those who are more learned and those who are of mature age. The deacons have functions in the Eucharist and about the altar which point to an early date; they have also much administrative work of an important kind, and especial provisions are made for the care of the sick and the dead, and the burial of those who perish by shipwreck.

One of the deacons is to be chosen as "chief deacon" (Protodeacon, 1:19, 1:34), and is charged with the care of pilgrims. There are no doorkeepers or singers, who begin to appear about 340 CE. The honour given to confessors is very conspicuous, and points back to an early date. But remarkable above all is the position given to women. We have "widows having precedence" or presbyteresses, three in number, deaconesses, virgins, and widows who are in receipt of the alms of the Church; and the first-named occupy a place of very great dignity, which is almost unequaled elsewhere (excepting in the earlier form of the apocryphal and Montanistic Acts and Martyrdom of Matthew), and which was formally condemned by the Council of Laodicea.

== Studies ==
- Sperry-White, G. The Testamentum Domini. Cambridge, 1991, Joint Liturgical Studies. (English Translation)
- Post, P., "La liturgie en tant qu'architecture? Remarques sur la relation entre le "Testamentum Domini Jesu Christi" et l'architecture des églises dans l'Illyricum oriental", Bijdragen, 42,4 (1981), 392-420.
- Gain, B., "Fragments grecs inédits du "Testamentum Domini" attribués à Saint Basile", Augustinianum, 32,2 (1992), 261-277 [exorcism].
- Sperry-White, G., "The imagery of angelic praise and heavenly topography in the Testament of our Lord", Ecclesia orans, 19,2 (2002), 315-332.
- Kreider, A., "Military service in the church orders", Journal of Religious Ethics, 31,3 (2003), 415-442.
- Troupeau, G., "Une version arabe de l'anaphore du "Testamentum Domini"," in C. Chartouni (éd.), Christianisme oriental: Kérygme et histoire: Mélanges offerts au père Michel Hayek (Paris, 2007), 247-256.
- Chronz, T., H. Brakmann, "Fragmente des "Testamentum Domini" in georgischer Übersetzung", Zeitschrift für antikes Christentum, 13,3 (2009), 395-402 [Prayer on healing oil and water].
