= Apostolic constitutions =

Apostolic constitutions may refer to:

- Apostolic constitution, a type of decree issued by the Catholic pope
- Apostolic Constitutions, a 4th-century document
