= Edmund Hauler =

Austrian philologist (1859–1941)

Edmund Hauler (17 November 1859, in Buda – 1 April 1941, in Vienna) was an Austrian classical philologist born in Ofen to a Danube Swabian German family. His father, Johann Hauler (1829–1888) was also a classical philologist.

== Life and works ==
In 1882 he earned his doctorate from the University of Vienna, and was awarded the sub auspiciis Imperatoris (under the auspices of the Emperor). In 1885 he continued his education at the University of Bonn with Hermann Usener (1834–1905) and Franz Bücheler (1837–1908), and from 1885 to 1887 undertook study trips to France, England, Switzerland and Italy. From 1890 to 1893 he was a high school teacher in Vienna, and afterwards lectured at the University of Vienna, where in 1899 he became a full professor.

In his studies, Hauler discovered a number of valuable literary fragments by classical authors. In 1886, he published Neue Bruchstücke zu Sallusts Historien as a result of his discovery of fragments containing the histories of Sallust. He also uncovered new fragments by the dramatist Menander and the poet Sotades.

In 1900 he deciphered and published the Verona Palimpsest, which includes fragmentary Latin versions of the Didascalia Apostolorum, Apostolic Church-Ordinance and Apostolic Tradition.

Beginning in 1897, he spent many years studying the Marcus Cornelius Fronto palimpsest, on which he authored over fifty articles. In 1899 he became editor of the magazines "Wiener Studien" and "Zeitschrift für die österreichischen Gymnasien". From 1925 until his death in 1941, Hauler was chairman of the Vienna "Corpus Scriptorum Ecclesiasticorum Latinorum" (CSEL).

== Selected works ==
- Terentiana, quaestiones cum specimine lexici, 1882.
- Neue bruchstücke zu Sallusts historien, 1886 - New fragments by the historian Sallust.
- Die Orléaner palimpsestfragmente zu Sallusts historien - The Orléans palimpsest fragments of Sallust.
- Zur Geschichte des griechischen Mimus, 1893 - The history of Greek mimes.
- Eine lateinische Palimpsestübersetzung der Didascalia apostolorum, 1896 - Latin palimpsest translation of Didascalia Apostolorum.
- Terence's "Phormio" (edition by Edmund Hauler), 1898.
- Didascaliae apostolorum fragmenta ueronensia Latina : accedunt canonum qui dicuntur apostolorum et Aegyptiorum reliquies, 1900.
- M. Cornelii Frontonis Epistulae : schedis tam editis quam ineditis Edmundi Hauleri (part of the series Bibliotheca scriptorum Graecorum et Romanorum Teubneriana).

== Notes and references ==
- This article is based on a translation of an equivalent article at the German Wikipedia, listed as an entry from the Österreichisches Biographisches Lexikon 1815–1950 and a biography @ NDB/ADB Deutsche Biographie.
