= Apostolic Canons =

4th-century Syrian ancient church order

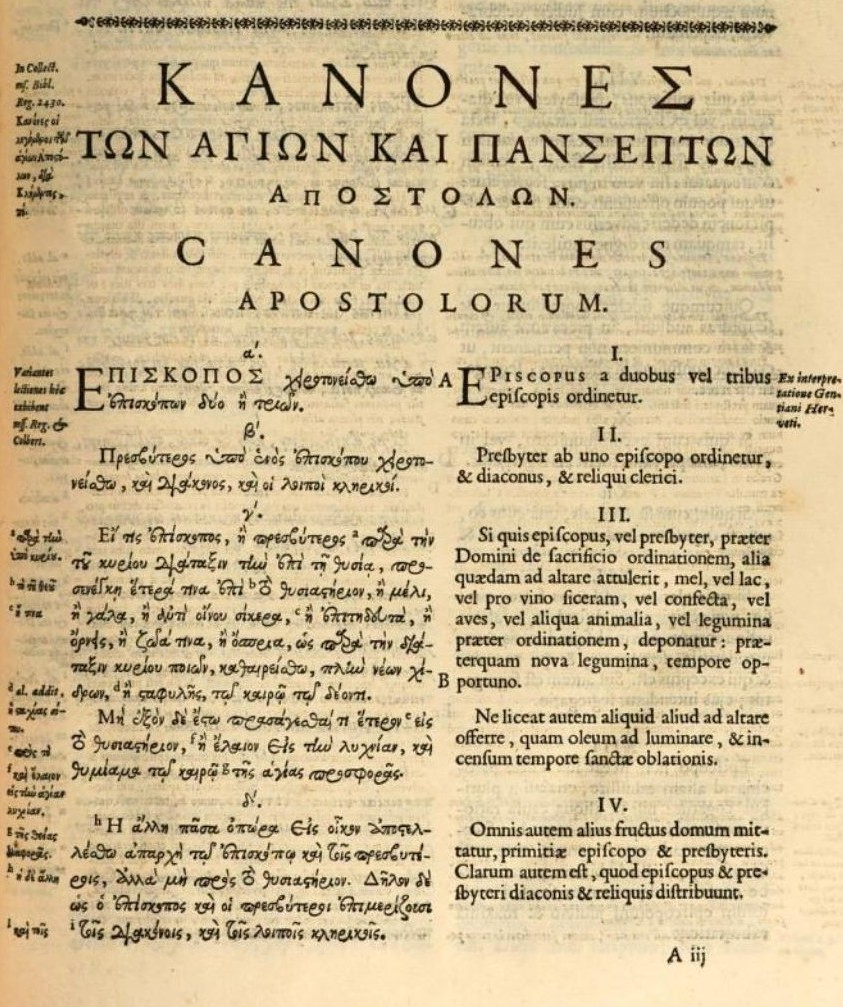
Canons 1 to 4 of the Apostolic Canons (Note: Translation: I. Let a bishop be ordained by two or three bishops. II. A presbyter by one bishop, as also a deacon, and the rest of the clergy. III. If any bishop or presbyter, otherwise than our Lord has ordained concerning the sacrifice, offer other things at the altar of God, as honey, milk, or strong beer instead of wine, any necessaries, or birds, or animals, or pulse, otherwise than is ordained, let him be deprived; excepting grains of new corn, or ears of wheat, or bunches of grapes in their season. For it is not lawful to offer anything besides these at the altar, and oil for the holy lamp, and incense in the time of the divine oblation. IV. But let all other fruits be sent to the house of the bishop, as first-fruits to him and to the presbyters, but not to the altar. Now it is plain that the bishop and presbyters are to divide them to the deacons and to the rest of the clergy.) attributed by some to the Apostles, in Greek (left) and Latin (right) from a 1715 edition

The Apostolic Canons, also called Apostolic canons (Latin: Canones apostolorum, "Canons of the Apostles"), Ecclesiastical Canons of the Same Holy Apostles, or Canons of the Holy Apostles, is a 4th-century Syrian Christian text. It is an ancient church order, a collection of ancient ecclesiastical canons concerning the government and discipline of the Early Christian Church, allegedly written by the Apostles. This text is an appendix to the eighth book of the Apostolic Constitutions. Like the other ancient church orders, the Apostolic Canons uses a pseudepigraphic form.

These eighty-five canons were approved by the Council in Trullo in 692 but were rejected by Pope Sergius I. In the Western Church only fifty of these canons circulated, translated in Latin by Dionysius Exiguus in about 500 AD, and included in the Western collections and afterwards in the Corpus Juris Canonici.

The document contains a list of canonical books.

== Content ==
They deal mostly with the office and duties of a Christian bishop, the qualifications and conduct of the clergy, the religious life of the Christian flock (abstinence, fasting), its external administration (excommunication, synods, relations with pagans and Jews), the sacraments (Baptism, Eucharist, Marriage); in a word, they are a handy summary of the statutory legislation of the Early Church.

The last of these decrees contains a very important list or canon of the Holy Scriptures.

Most modern critics agree that they could not have been composed before the Council of Antioch of 341, some twenty of whose canons they quote; nor even before the latter end of the 4th century, since they are certainly posterior to the Apostolic Constitutions. Franz Xaver von Funk, admittedly a foremost authority on the latter and all similar early canonical texts, locates the composition of the Apostolic Canons in the 5th century, near the year 400. Thereby he approaches the opinion of his scholarly predecessor, Johann Sebastian Drey, the first among modern writers to study profoundly these ancient canons; he distinguished two editions of them, a shorter one (fifty) about the middle of the 5th century, and a longer one (eighty-five) early in the 6th century. Von Funk admits but one edition. They were certainly current in the Eastern Church in the first quarter of the 6th century, for in about 520 Severus of Antioch quotes canons 21-23.

== Authorship ==
The original Greek text claims the Apostolic Canons are the very legislation of the Apostles themselves, at least as promulgated by their great disciple, Clement. Nevertheless, the Catholic Encyclopedia considers their claim to genuine Apostolic origin is "quite false and untenable" despite the fact that they are "a venerable mirror of ancient Christian life and blameless in doctrine". At least half of the canons are derived from earlier constitutions, and probably not many of them are the actual productions of the compiler, whose aim was to gloss over the real nature of the Constitutions, and secure their incorporation with the Epistles of Clement in the New Testament of his day. The Codex Alexandrinus does indeed append the Clementine Epistles to its text of the New Testament. The Canons may be a little later in date than the preceding Constitutions, but they are evidently from the same Syrian theological circle.

=== Author ===
The author seems to be from Syria, since the Syro-Macedonian calendar is utilized. The contents are borrowed mostly from the Syrian council (Council of Antioch, 341). According to Von Funk the Canons are identical with the compiler or interpolator of the Apostolic Constitutions, who was certainly also Syrian.

=== Date ===
Scholars agree that genuine composition by the Apostles is "quite false and untenable". While some, like Beveridge and Hefele, believe they were written around the late 2nd to early 3rd century, most believe they could not have been written before the Council of Antioch in 341, since around twenty of those canons are quoted, or even later around the end of the 4th century since they "certainly" post-date the Apostolic Constitutions.

Von Funk, a foremost authority on the Apostolic Canons and all similar early canonical texts, locates the composition of the Apostolic Canons in the 5th century, seeing two editions a shorter 50 canon list, and a longer 85 canon list composed later in the 6th century, where it was quoted by Severus of Antioch.

== Reception ==
There is some controversy over the number of these canons. In the Apostolic Constitutions, the Apostolic Canons are eighty-five (occasionally eighty-four, a variant in the Manuscripts that arises from the occasional counting of two canons as one). In the latter half of the 6th century, Joannes Scholasticus, Patriarch of Constantinople from 565 to 577, published a collection of synodal decrees in which he included these eighty-five canons, and this number was finally consecrated for the Greek Church by the Trullan or Quinisext Council of 692, which also confined the current Greek tradition of their Apostolic origin.

On the other hand, the Latin Church, throughout the Middle Ages, recognized only fifty canons of the Apostles. This was the number finally adopted by Dionysius Exiguus, who first translated these canons into Latin about 500. It is not very clear why he omitted canons 51-85; he seems to have been acquainted with them and to have used the Apostolic Constitutions. Dionysius made three versions of the Apostolic Canons; it is the second of these versions which obtained general European currency by its incorporation as the opening text of his famous Latin collection of canons (both synodal decrees and papal decretals) known as the Dionysiana Collectio, made public in the first decade of the 6th century. Later collections of canons (Italy, Spain, France, Germany, etc.) borrowed from him; the text passed into Pseudo-Isidore, and eventually Gratian included (c. 1140) some excerpts from these canons in his Decretum, whereby a universal recognition and use were gained for them in the law schools. At a much earlier date Justinian (in his Sixth Novel) had recognized them as the work of the Apostles and confirmed them as ecclesiastical law.

Nevertheless, from their first appearance in the West they aroused suspicion. Canon 46 for example, that rejected all heretical baptism, was notoriously opposed to Roman and Western practice. In the so-called Decretum traditionally attributed to Pope Gelasius (492-96) they are denounced as an apocryphal book, i. e. not recognized by the Catholic Church, though this note of censure was probably not in the original Decretum, but with others was added under Pope Hormisdas (514-23). Consequently, in a second edition (lost, except preface) of his Collectio canonum, prepared under the latter pope, Dionysius Exiguus omitted them; even in the first edition he admitted that very many in the West were loath to acknowledge them (quamplurimi quidem assensum non prœbuere facilem). Hincmar of Reims (died 882) declared that they were not written by the Apostles, and as late as the middle of the 11th century, Western theologians (Cardinal Humbert, 1054) distinguished between the eighty-five Greek canons that they declared apocryphal, and the fifty Latin canons recognized as orthodox rules by antiquity.

== Influence ==
The influence of the Apostolic Canons was greatly increased by the various versions of them soon current in the Christian Church, East and West. They were also translated (more or less fully) into Syriac, Arabic, Coptic, and Armenian; in general they seem to have furnished during the 5th and 6th centuries a large element of the ecclesiastical legislation in the Eastern Church. The fifty Latin canons were first printed in Jacques Merlin's edition of the Councils (Paris, 1524); the eighty-five Greek Canons by G. Holoander, in his edition of Justinian's Novels (Nuremberg, 1531), whence they made their way into the earlier editions of the Corpus Juris Civilis, the Corpus Juris Canonici, and the large collections of acts and decrees of the councils.
