= Philotheos Bryennios =

Greek Orthodox metropolitan of Nicomedia (1833-1917)

- Metropolitan of Nicomedia
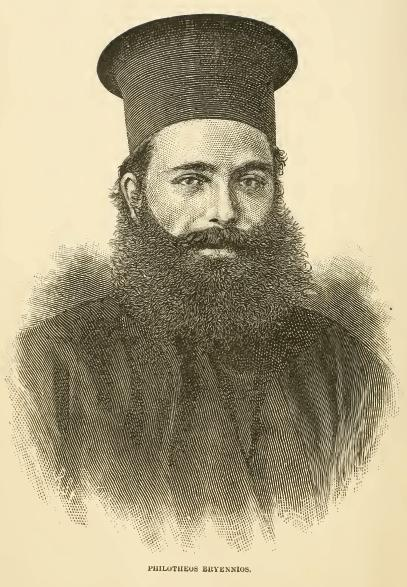

Personal details
- Born: 7 April 1833 Constantinople, Ottoman Empire (modern-day Istanbul, Turkey)
- Died: 18 November 1917 (aged 84) Constantinople, Ottoman Empire (modern-day Istanbul, Turkey)

Philotheos Bryennios (Greek: Φιλόθεος Βρυέννιος; 7 April 1833 – 18 November 1917) was a Greek Orthodox metropolitan of Nicomedia, and the discoverer in 1873 of an important manuscript with copies of early Church documents.

== Life ==
Born in the Tavtalos (Kurtuluş) district of Constantinople, with the secular name of Theodore, he was educated at the theological school in Halki, and at the universities of Leipzig, Munich, and Berlin. He became a professor at Halki in 1861, and then director in 1863. In 1867 he went to head the Patriarchal School in Constantinople, leaving in 1875 to attend the Old Catholic conference in Bonn, during which he was appointed metropolitan of Serres in Macedonia. In 1877 he became Metropolitan of Nicomedia.

In 1877, he participated in a commission dealing with plundered monasteries in Moldavia and Wallachia.

Metropolitan Bryennios died in 1917 in his native Constantinople.

== Works ==
In 1873, he discovered a manuscript in the library of the monastery of the Holy Sepulcher (Jerusalem Patriarchate metochion) in Constantinople (present day Istanbul, Turkey), which contained a Synopsis of the books of the Old and New Testaments attributed to St. John Chrysostom, the Epistle of Barnabas, the First Epistle of Clement to the Corinthians, the Second Epistle of Clement to the Corinthians, the Teaching of the Twelve Apostles (Didache), the twelve Ignatian Epistles, and a short treatise on the genealogy of Christ. The epistles were published in 1875, and the Didache in 1883; the epistles of Clement and the Didache had notes written by Bryennios. The discovery of the Didache was significant because writers of the early 3rd, 4th and later centuries had spoken of it, but it was presumed lost.
