= Aksumite Collection =

Early Aksumite liturgical manuscript

The Aksumite Collection is a Geʽez manuscript containing a collection of texts that represent the earliest discovered canon-law and liturgical texts in the Geʽez language and in Ethiopian historiography. The manuscript can be dated using paleography to the 13th century at the latest, but represents a collection of translations of texts from Greek into Geʽez that were made during Late Antiquity, sometime between the fifth and sixth centuries AD, or to the seventh at the latest, during the period of the Kingdom of Aksum.

The texts found in the Aksumite Collection cover the areas of canon law, liturgy, the history of Egypt in the fourth and fifth centuries, and the history of church councils. It was likely arranged between the mid-5th and mid-6th centuries, and its content shows strong ties to an Egyptian setting, especially with Alexandrian archives. Some of its contents are works that have previously been lost, and now are only known from the Aksumite Collection. An example of this is the Apostolic Tradition, the most important Christian canonico-liturgical document, previously known only from Latin fragments, and is now known more completely from the Aksumite Collection. Other texts contained in the manuscript include the History of the Episcopate of Alexandria, Baptismal Order, Euchologion, the Canons of Chalcedon, the treatise On the One Judge, etc. The work of Giyorgis of Sägla in the 15th century reveals that Ethiopia's late antique heritage, attested by the Aksumite Collection, continued to be received in Ethiopia's medieval period.

The finding of the manuscript in 1999 disrupted the understanding then of the development of the literary history, textual transmission, and translation dynamics in Ethiopia during Late Antiquity. It was discovered by Jacques Mercier who committed its study to Alessandro Bausi, who continues to be its primary researcher and is working on publishing editions and translations of its contents. The latest digitization effort for the manuscript was undertaken by the Ethio-SPaRe project.

== Translations ==
Apostolic Tradition was translated into Italian in 2011 and into English in 2025.

The History of the Episcopate of Alexandria was translated into English in 2016.

On the One Judge was translated into English in 2021.

In 2020, the Baptismal Ritual was translated into German.

== Complete list of works in the Aksumite Collection ==
The manuscript contains three main blocks with a total of 35 texts:

Block A:

- The Ecclesiastical canons
- The History of the Episcopate of Alexandria
- The Epistle 70 of Cyprian of Carthage
- The Apostolic Tradition
- The Parallel section to Apostolic Constitutions VIII
- The treatise on the Charisms

Block B:

- A List of Apostles and disciples
- The names of the months
- A Baptismal ritual
- A Euchologion

Block C:

- The 81 Apostolic canons
- The Council and the names of the fathers of Nicaea
- The Canons of the council of Nicaea
- The Epistle of Constantine to the Alexandrinians
- The Epistle of Constantine on Arius
- The Epistle of Athanasius to Epictetus
- The treatise On the Only Judge
- The Council and the names of the fathers of Serdica
- The Canons of the council of Serdica
- The Antiochean collection of the canons of the councils, composed of:
  - The Canons of the council of Neocaesarea
  - The Canons of the council of Ancyra
  - The Canons of the council of Neocaesarea
  - The Council of Gangra
  - The Canons of the council of Gangra
  - The Council of Antioch
  - The Canons of the council of Antioch
  - The Canons of the council of Laodicea
- The Canons of the council of Chalcedon
- The Canons of the council of Constantinople
- The Council of Ephesus Sylloge of Timotheus Aelerus, composed of:
  - The Epistle to the Alexandrinians
  - The Epistle to the Constantinopolitans
  - The Twelve chapters of Cyril of Alexandria
  - The Refutation of the council of Chalcedon
  - The Treatises of Gregory of Nazianzus
- The Canonical answers of Peter of Alexandria

== See also ==
- Alexandrine Sinodos
- Garima Gospels
