= Johann Hauler =

Austrian educator and classical philologist

Johann Hauler (9 October 1829 – 9 August 1888) was an Austrian educator and classical philologist born in Oberrimsingen, a district of Breisach, Germany. He was the father of Edmund Hauler (1859–1941), a professor of classical philology at the University of Vienna.

He studied classical and Romance philology at the University of Bonn under Friedrich Wilhelm Ritschl (1806–1876) and Friedrich Gottlieb Welcker (1784–1868), then at the University of Freiburg with Theodor Bergk (1812–1881), and finally in Paris. After earning his doctorate in 1855 with the dissertation "De Theocriti vita et carminibus", he taught French and ancient languages at the "German gymnasium" in Ofen.

In 1860 he relocated to Vienna as Oberlehrer at the Theresianum, then held the same position at the Akademischen Gymnasium (from 1862). In 1877 he was appointed director of the Staatsgymnasiums Wien II (Vienna State Gymnasium II). In 1880 he became a member of the Mitglied des Landesschulrats für Niederösterreich.

He was the author of "Lateinisches Übungsbuch" (Latin Workbook), published in 32 editions up until 1938. It was edited and processed by a number of scholars, including his son, Edmund Hauler. He died on 9 August 1888 in Trautmannsdorf an der Leitha. In 1934, the Haulerstraße in Alsergrund (9th district, Vienna) was named in his honor.
