= Apostolic Constitutions =

4th-century Christian text; church order

The Apostolic Constitutions or Constitutions of the Holy Apostles (Latin: Constitutiones Apostolorum) is a Christian collection divided into eight books which is classified among the ancient church orders, a genre of early Christian literature, that offered authoritative pseudo-apostolic prescriptions on moral conduct, liturgy and Church organization.

The work can be dated from 375 to 380 AD. The provenance is usually regarded as Syria, probably Antioch. The author is unknown, although since James Ussher, it has been often considered to be the same author as that of the letters of Pseudo-Ignatius, perhaps the 4th-century Eunomian bishop Julian of Cilicia.

== Content ==
The Apostolic Constitutions contains eight books on early Christian discipline, worship, and doctrine, apparently intended to serve as a manual of guidance for the clergy, and to some extent for the laity. It purports to be the work of the Twelve Apostles, whether given by them as individuals or as a body.

The structure of the Apostolic Constitutions can be summarized:

- Books 1 to 6 are a free re-wording of the Didascalia Apostolorum, an earlier work of the same genre.
- Book 7 is partially based on the Didache. Chapters 33-45 of book 7 contain prayers similar to Jewish prayers used in synagogues.
- Book 8 is a more complex section composed as follows:
  - chapters 1-2 contain an extract of a lost treatise on the charismata
  - chapters 3-46 are based on the Apostolic Tradition, greatly expanded, along with other material
  - chapter 47 is known as the Canons of the Apostles and it had a wider circulation than the rest of the book.

The best manuscript, Vatican gr 1506, has Arian leanings, which are not found in other manuscripts because this material would have been censured as heretical.

The Apostolic Constitutions is an important source for the history of the liturgy in the Antiochene rite. It contains an outline of an anaphora in book two, a full anaphora in book seven (which is an expansion of the one found in the Didache), and the complete Liturgy of the eighth book of the Apostolic Constitutions, which is the oldest known form that can be described as a complete divine liturgy.

== Influence ==
In antiquity, the Apostolic Constitutions were mistakenly supposed to be gathered and handed down by Clement of Rome, the authority of whose name gave weight to more than one such piece of early Christian literature (see also Clementine literature).

The Apostolic Constitutions were rejected as apocryphal by the Decretum Gelasianum, and the 692 Quinisext Council rejected most of the work as heretical interpolations. Eastern Christianity accepted only part of Book 8, known as the Canons of the Apostles. Nevertheless, the 1913 Catholic Encyclopedia describes the Constitutions as held in "high esteem" in antiquity, and as the basis for significant amounts of canon law.

Even if the text of the Apostolic Constitutions was extant in many libraries during the Middle Ages, it was largely ignored. In 1546 a Latin version of a text was found in Crete and published. The first complete edition of the Greek text was printed in 1563 by Turrianus.

Today the Apostolic Constitutions are regarded as a highly significant historical document, as they reveal the moral and religious conditions, as well as the liturgical observances of 3rd and 4th centuries. They are part of the Ante-Nicene Fathers collection. Their formulation of a priestly ordination text invoking upon each candidate "the spirit of grace and counsel, so that with a pure heart he may help and govern the People of God" was recalled by the Second Vatican Council in asserting that priests are to work with and help the bishops "in their role of teaching, sanctifying and nourishing the People of God".

== Canons of the Apostles ==
The forty-seventh and last chapter of the eighth book of the Apostolic Constitutions contains the eighty-five Canons of the Apostles, which present themselves as being from an apostolic Council at Antioch. These canons were later approved by the Eastern Council in Trullo in 692 but rejected by Pope Constantine. In the Latin Church only fifty of these canons circulated, translated to Latin by Dionysius Exiguus on about 500 AD, and included in the Western collections and afterwards in the Corpus Juris Canonici.

Canon n. 85 is a list of canonical books: a 46-book Old Testament canon which essentially corresponds to that of the Septuagint, 26 books of what is now the New Testament (excludes Revelation), two Epistles of Clement, and the Apostolic Constitutions themselves, also here attributed to Clement, at least as compiler.

== Epitome of the eighth book ==
It is also known as the Epitome, and usually named Epitome of the eighth Book of the Apostolic Constitutions (or sometimes titled The Constitutions of the Holy Apostles concerning ordination through Hippolytus or simply The Constitutions through Hippolytus) containing a re-wording of chapters 1–2, 4–5, 16–28, 30–34, 45–46 of the eighth book. The text was first published by Paul de Lagarde in 1856 and later by Franz Xaver von Funk in 1905.

== See also ==
- Apostolic Church-Ordinance
- Alexandrine Sinodos
- Jus antiquum
- Verona Palimpsest
