= Verona Palimpsest =

494 CE Latin collection of church orders

The Verona Palimpsest (or Fragmentum Veronese) is a manuscript, dated about the 494 AD, which contains a Christian collection of Church Orders in Latin. The manuscript, which contains many lacunae, is the only source of the Latin version of the Apostolic Tradition.

== Description ==
This manuscript is preserved in the Chapter House Library (Biblioteca Capitolare) in Verona and is numbered LV (olim 53). It is a palimpsest in which the Sententiae of Isidore of Seville in the 8th century has been written over the previous content, which includes:

- Didascalia Apostolorum (of which 32 leaves of 86 total were preserved)
- Apostolic Church-Ordinance (of which 1.5 leaves of 4.5 total were preserved)
- the Egyptian Church Order, better known as Apostolic Tradition, (of which 6.5 leaves of 11.5 total were preserved). Chapters 9 through 20, 22 through 25, and 39 and 40 are missing completely.
- a leaf containing Fasti consulares running to 494, which allows for dating of the manuscript.

== Publication ==
This Palimpsest was discovered in 1896 and fully published in 1900 by Edmund Hauler. A further edition was published by Erik Tidner in 1963

== See also ==
- Apostolic Constitutions
- Alexandrine Sinodos
