= Pseudo-Ignatius =

4th-century writer

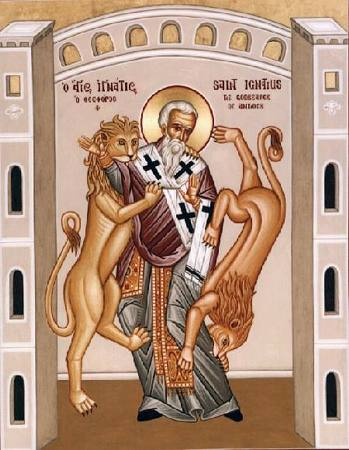
Pseudo-Ignatius claimed to be the 2nd century writer, Ignatius of Antioch.

Pseudo-Ignatius was a 4th-century writer who claimed to be Ignatius of Antioch. He is the author of the Ignatian forgeries but he also wrote the Apostolic Constitutions and a commentary on Job. Harnack also identified Pseudo-Clement with Pseudo-Ignatius. Pseudo-Ignatius has some Arian leanings but is not completely Arian; on the other hand, he in some ways resembles the Apollinarians. However it is not possible to draw clear conclusions on his Christology.

According to Bart D. Ehrman, the writer likely claimed the name Ignatius to bolster his own theological views.

== Theology ==
Pseudo-Ignatius opposed asceticism and he had Arian leanings. In the Apostolic Constitutions, he held 1-3 Maccabees, 1-2 Clement and possibly Judith as canonical (however some manuscripts lack Judith), but denied the canonical status of the Book of Revelation.

Pseudo-Ignatius in the Apostolic Constitutions affirmed paedocommunion, and baptism by immersion.

== Writings ==
Six epistles are generally attributed to Pseudo-Ignatius:

- Epistle to the Tarsians
- Epistle to the Antiochians
- Epistle to Hero, a Deacon of Antioch
- Epistle to the Philippians
- Epistle of Mary of Cassobola to Ignatius
- Epistle of Ignatius to Mary of Cassobloa

Four other epistles were added to the corpus in the late medieval era. They were originally written in Latin, and are not believed to be by the same author:

- First Epistle to St. John
- Second Epistle to St. John
- Epistle of Ignatius to the Virgin Mary
- Epistle of the Virgin Mary to Ignatius

In modern times, two other works have been attributed to the fourth-century author, though they were not circulated under Ignatius' name:

- The Apostolic Constitutions
- A commentary on the Book of Job

Pseudo-Ignatius is also believed to have interpolated the genuine letters of Ignatius.
