= Didache =

Early Christian treatise

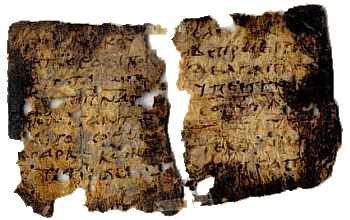
Didache manuscript

The Didache (/ˈdɪdəkeɪ, -ki/; Ancient Greek: Διδαχή, romanized: Didaché, lit. 'Teaching'), also known as The Lord's Teaching Through the Twelve Apostles to the Nations (Διδαχὴ Κυρίου διὰ τῶν δώδεκα ἀποστόλων τοῖς ἔθνεσιν, Didachḕ Kyríou dià tō̂n dṓdeka apostólōn toîs éthnesin), is a brief, anonymous early Christian treatise written in Koine Greek, dated by modern scholars to the first or (less commonly) second century AD.

The first line of this treatise is: "The teaching of the Lord to the Gentiles (or Nations) by the twelve apostles". (Note: Greek: Διδαχὴ κυρίου διὰ τῶν δώδεκα ἀποστόλων τοῖς ἔθνεσιν.) The text, parts of which constitute the oldest extant written catechism, has three main sections dealing with Christian ethics, rituals such as baptism and Eucharist, and Church organization. The opening chapters describe the virtuous Way of Life and the wicked Way of Death. The Lord's Prayer is included in full. Baptism is by immersion, or by affusion if immersion is not practical. Fasting is ordered for Wednesdays and Fridays. Two primitive Eucharistic prayers are given. Church organization was at an early stage of development. Itinerant apostles and prophets are important, serving as "chief priests" and possibly celebrating the Eucharist; meanwhile, local bishops and deacons also have authority and seem to be taking the place of the itinerant ministry.

The Didache is considered the first example of the genre of Church Orders. It reveals how Jewish Christians saw themselves and how they adapted their practice for Gentile Christians. It is similar in several ways to the Gospel of Matthew, perhaps because both texts originated in similar communities. The opening chapters, which also appear in other early Christian texts like the Epistle of Barnabas, are likely derived from an earlier Jewish source.

The Didache is considered a product of the group of second-generation Christian writers known as the Apostolic Fathers. The work was considered by some Church Fathers to be a part of the New Testament, while being rejected by others as spurious or non-canonical. In the end, it was not accepted into the New Testament canon. However, works which draw directly or indirectly from the Didache include the Didascalia Apostolorum, the Apostolic Constitutions and the Ethiopic Didascalia, the latter of which is included in the broader canon of the Ethiopian Orthodox Church.

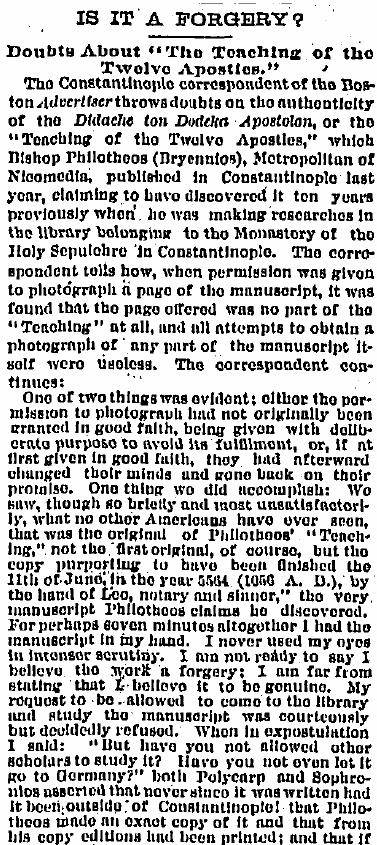
Article about the rediscovery of the Didache, Chicago Daily Tribune, 1884

Lost for centuries, a Greek manuscript of the Didache was rediscovered in 1873 by Philotheos Bryennios, Metropolitan of Nicomedia, in the Codex Hierosolymitanus of the year 1056, a compilation of texts of the Apostolic Fathers found in the Jerusalem Monastery of the Most Holy Sepulchre in Constantinople. A Latin version of the first five chapters was discovered in 1900 by Joseph Schlecht in an 11th-century manuscript in Munich.

Two uncial fragments containing Greek text of the Didache (verses 1:3c–4a; 2:7–3:2) were found among the Oxyrhynchus Papyri (no. 1782) and are now in the collection of the Bodleian Art, Archaeology and Ancient World Library in Oxford. There is also a Coptic papyrus fragment containing verses 10.3b-12.2a, which came to light in 1923, was bought by the British Museum and published in 1924.

== Date, composition and modern translations ==
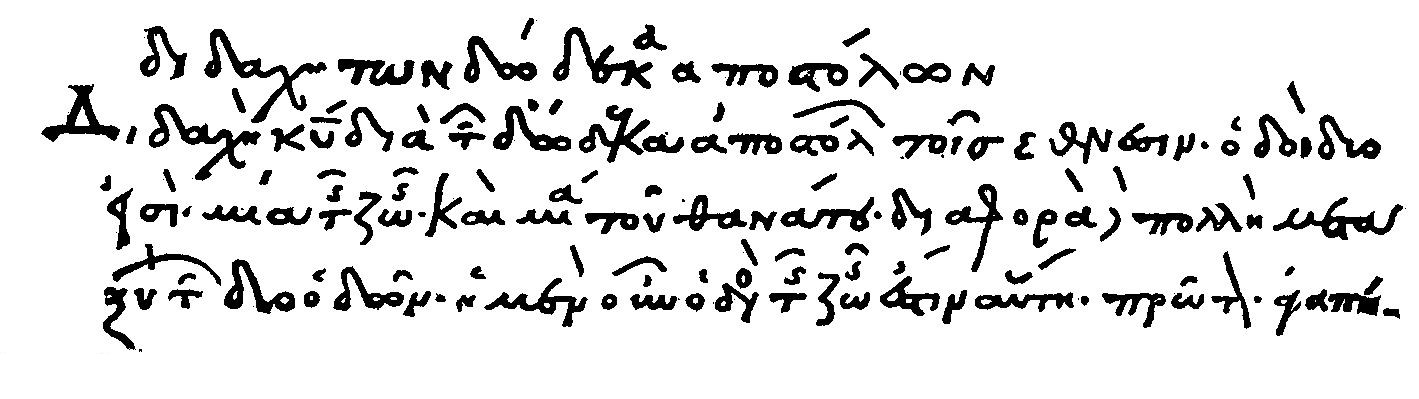
The title of the Didache in the manuscript discovered in 1873

Many English and American scholars once dated the text to the early second century, a view still held by some today, but most scholars now assign the Didache to the first century. The document is a composite work, and the discovery of the Community Rule among the Dead Sea Scrolls, has provided evidence of development over a considerable period, beginning as a Jewish catechetical work which was then developed into a church manual.

Dating the document is thus made difficult both by the lack of hard evidence and its composite character. The Didache may have been compiled in its present form as late as 150, although a date closer to the end of the first century seems more probable to many.

The teaching is an anonymous pastoral manual which Aaron Milavec states "reveals more about how Jewish-Christians saw themselves and how they adapted their Judaism for gentiles than any other book in the Christian Scriptures". The Two Ways section is likely based on an earlier Jewish source. The community that produced the Didache could have been based in Syria, as it addressed the gentiles but from a Judaic perspective, at some remove from Jerusalem, and shows no evidence of Pauline influence. Alan Garrow claims that its earliest layer may have originated in the decree issued by the Council of Jerusalem in 49–50, that is, by the Jerusalem assembly under James, brother of Jesus.

The text was lost, but scholars knew of it through the writing of later church fathers, some of whom had drawn heavily on it. In 1873 in Constantinople (now Istanbul), metropolitan Philotheos Bryennios found a Greek copy of the Didache, written in 1056, and he published it in 1883. Hitchcock and Brown produced the first English translation in March 1884. Adolf von Harnack produced the first German translation in 1884, and Paul Sabatier produced the first French translation and commentary in 1885.

== Early references ==
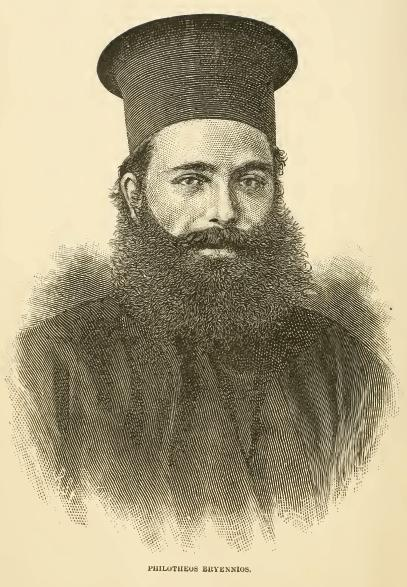
Philotheos Bryennios, who re-discovered the Didache

The Didache is mentioned by Eusebius (c. 324) as the Teachings of the Apostles along with other books he considered non-canonical:

Let there be placed among the spurious works the Acts of Paul, the so-called Shepherd and the Apocalypse of Peter, and besides these the Epistle of Barnabas, and what are called the Teachings of the Apostles, and also the Apocalypse of John, if this be thought proper; for as I wrote before, some reject it, and others place it in the canon.

Athanasius of Alexandria (367) and Tyrannius Rufinus (c. 380) list the Didache among apocrypha. Rufinus gives the curious alternative title Judicium Petri "Judgment of Peter." It is rejected by Nikephoros I of Constantinople (c. 810), the Apocalypse of Pseudo-Athanasius, the Synopsis of Holy Scripture and the Catalogue of the Sixty Canonical Books. It is accepted by the Apostolic Constitutions, Canon 85, John of Damascus, and in Orthodox Tewahedo churches. The Adversus Aleatores by an imitator of Cyprian quotes it by name. Unacknowledged citations are widespread, if less certain.

The section Two Ways shares the same language with the Epistle of Barnabas, chapters 18–20, sometimes word for word, added to, dislocated, or abridged. Barnabas iv, 9 either derives from Didache, 16, 2–3, or vice versa. There can also be seen many similarities to the Epistles of both Polycarp and Ignatius of Antioch. The Shepherd of Hermas seems to reflect it. Other theologians, including Irenaeus, Clement of Alexandria, (Note: Clement quotes the Didache as scripture.) and Origen also seem to use the work, and so in the West do Optatus and the "Gesta apud Zenophilum". (Note: "Proceedings Before Zenophilus" is the second of sixteen appendices to Optatus' (Bishop of Milevis, Numidia) seven-book treatise Against the Donatists by Optatus, c. 370.) The Didascalia Apostolorum are founded upon the Didache.

The Apostolic Church-Ordinance used a part and the Apostolic Constitutions embody the Didascalia. There are echoes in Justin Martyr, Tatian, Theophilus of Antioch, Cyprian, and Lactantius.

== Contents ==
The Didache is a relatively short text with only some 2,300 words. The contents may be divided into four parts, which most scholars agree were combined from separate sources by a later redactor: the first is the Two Ways, the Way of Life and the Way of Death (chapters 1–6); the second part is a ritual dealing with baptism, fasting, and Communion (chapters 7–10); the third speaks of the ministry and how to treat apostles, prophets, bishops, and deacons (chapters 11–15); and the final section (chapter 16) is a prophecy of the Antichrist and the Second Coming.

=== Title ===
The manuscript is commonly referred to as the Didache. This is short for the header found on the document and the title used by the Church Fathers, "The Lord's Teaching of the Twelve Apostles". (Note: Greek: Διδαχὴ Κυρίου διὰ τῶν δώδεκα ἀποστόλων, Didachē Kyriou dia tōn dōdeka apostolōn.) A fuller title or subtitle is also found next in the manuscript, "The Teaching of the Lord to the Gentiles (Note: Some translations use 'Nations' in place of 'Gentiles'.) by the Twelve Apostles". (Note: Greek:Διδαχὴ κυρίου διὰ τῶν δώδεκα ἀποστόλων τοῖς ἔθνεσιν, Didachē kyriou dia tōn dōdeka apostolōn tois ethnesin.)

=== Description ===
Willy Rordorf considered the first five chapters as "essentially Jewish, but the Christian community was able to use it" by adding the "evangelical section". The title 'Lord' in the Didache is reserved usually for "Lord God", while Jesus is called "the servant" of the Father (9:2f.; 10:2f.). Baptism was practiced "in the name of the Father and of the Son and of the Holy Spirit." Scholars generally agree that 9:5, which speaks of baptism "in the name of the Lord", represents an earlier tradition that was gradually replaced by a trinity of names." A similarity with Acts 3 is noted by Aaron Milavec: both see Jesus as "the servant (pais) (Note: Describing Jesus as παῖς, pais; "a boy (as often beaten with impunity), or (by analogy) a girl, and (generally) a child; specifically a slave or servant (especially a minister to a king; and by eminence to God): – child, maid (-en), (man) servant, son, young man" Strong's G3817.) of God". The community is presented as "awaiting the kingdom from the Father as entirely a future event".

=== The two ways ===
The first section (Chapters 1–6) begins: "There are two ways, one of life and one of death, and there is a great difference between these two ways."

Apostolic Fathers (1992) notes:

The Two Ways material appears to have been intended, in light of 7.1, as a summary of basic instruction about the Christian life to be taught to those who were preparing for baptism and church membership. In its present form it represents the Christianization of a common Jewish form of moral instruction. Similar material is found in a number of other Christian writings from the first through about the fifth centuries, including the Epistle of Barnabas, the Didascalia, the Apostolic Church Ordinances, the Summary of Doctrine, the Apostolic Constitutions, the Life of Schnudi, and On the Teaching of the Apostles (or Doctrina), some of which are dependent on the Didache. The interrelationships between these various documents, however, are quite complex and much remains to be worked out.

— Apostolic Fathers, 2nd ed., Lightfoot-Harmer-Holmes, 1992

The closest parallels in the use of the Two Ways doctrine are found among the Essene Jews at the Dead Sea Scrolls community. The Qumran community included a Two Ways teaching in its founding charter, The Community Rule.

Throughout the Two Ways there are many Old Testament quotes shared with the Gospels, and many theological similarities, but Jesus is never mentioned by name. The first chapter opens with the V'ahavta ("you shall love God"), the Great Commandment ("your neighbor as yourself"), and the Golden Rule in the negative form. Then come short extracts in common with the Sermon on the Mount, together with a curious passage on giving and receiving, which is also cited with variations in Shepherd of Hermas (Mand., ii, 4–6). The Latin omits 1:3–6 and 2:1, and these sections have no parallel in Epistle of Barnabas; therefore, they may be a later addition, suggesting Hermas and the present text of the Didache may have used a common source, or one may have relied on the other. Chapter 2 contains the commandments against murder, adultery, corrupting boys, sexual promiscuity, theft, magic, sorcery, abortion, infanticide, coveting, perjury, false testimony, speaking evil, holding grudges, being double-minded, not acting as one speaks, greed, avarice, hypocrisy, maliciousness, arrogance, plotting evil against neighbors, hate, narcissism and expansions on these generally, with references to the words of Jesus. Chapter 3 attempts to explain how one vice leads to another: anger to murder, concupiscence to adultery, and so forth. The whole chapter is excluded in Barnabas. A number of precepts are added in chapter 4, which ends: "This is the Way of Life." Verse 13 states that one must not forsake the Lord's commandments, neither adding nor subtracting (see also Deuteronomy 4:2, 12:32). The Way of Death (chapter 5) is a list of vices to be avoided. Chapter 6 exhorts to the keeping in the Way of this Teaching:

See that no one causes you to err from this way of the teaching, since apart from God it teaches you. For if you are able to bear the entire yoke of the Lord, you will be perfect; but if you are not able to do this, do what you are able. And concerning food, bear what you are able; but against that which is sacrificed to idols be exceedingly careful; for it is the service of dead gods.

The Didache, like 1 Corinthians 10:21, does not give an absolute prohibition on eating meat which has been offered to idols, but merely advises being careful. Comparable to the Didache is the "let him eat herbs" of Paul of Tarsus as a hyperbolical expression like 1 Corinthians 8:13 "I will never eat flesh, lest I should scandalize my brother", thus giving no support to the notion of vegetarianism in the Early Church. John Chapman in the Catholic Encyclopedia (1908) states that the Didache is referring to Jewish meats. The Latin version substitutes for chapter 6 a similar close, omitting all reference to meats and to idolothyta, and concluding with "per Domini nostri Jesu Christi [...] in saecula saeculorum, amen" ('by our lord Jesus Christ [...] for ever and ever, amen'). This is the end of the translation. This suggests the translator lived at a day when idolatry had disappeared, and when the remainder of the Didache was out of date. There would be no other such reason for omitting chapter 1, 3–6, so these chapters were presumably not in the copy used by the translator.

=== Vice and virtue lists ===
Vice lists, which are common appearances in Paul's epistles, were relatively unusual within ancient Judaism of the Old Testament times. Within the Gospels, Jesus' structure of teaching the Beatitudes is often dependent upon the Law and the Prophets. At times, however, Jesus expressed such vice lists, such as in Mark 7:20–23. Paul's vice and virtue lists could bear more influence from the Hellenistic-Jewish influences of Philo (20 BC – 50 AD) and other writers of the intertestamental period.

The way of death and the "grave sin", which are forbidden, is reminiscent of the various "vice lists" found in the Pauline Epistles, which warn against engaging in certain behaviours if one wants to enter the Kingdom of God. Contrasting what Paul wrote in 1 Corinthians 6:9–10, Galatians 5:19–21, and what was written in 1 Timothy 1:9–11 (Note: Most modern scholars do not affirm that Paul authored 1 Timothy.) with Didache 2 displays a certain commonality with one another, almost with the same warnings and words, except for one line: "thou shalt not corrupt boys". Whereas Paul uses the compound word arsenokoitai (ἀρσενοκοῖται), a hapax legomenon literally meaning 'male-bedder', based on the Greek words for 'male' and 'lie with' found in the Septuagint translation of Leviticus 18:22, the Didache uses a word translated as 'child corrupter' (παιδοφθορήσεις, paidophthorēseis) which is likewise used in the Epistle of Barnabas.

=== Rituals ===
==== Baptism ====
The second part (chapters 7 to 10) begins with an instruction on baptism, the sacramental rite that admits someone into the Christian Church. Baptism is to be conferred "in the Name of the Father, and of the Son and of the Holy Spirit" with triple immersion in "living water" (that is, flowing water, probably in a stream). If this is not practical, baptism in cold or even warm water is acceptable. If the water is insufficient for immersion, it may be poured three times on the head (affusion). The baptized and the baptizer, and, if possible, anyone else attending the ritual should fast for one or two days beforehand.

The New Testament is rich in metaphors for baptism but offers few details about the practice itself, not even whether the candidates professed their faith in a formula. The Didache is the oldest extra-biblical source for information about baptism, but it, too lacks these details. The Two Ways section of the Didache is presumably the sort of ethical instruction that catechumens (students) received in preparation for baptism.

==== Fasting ====
Chapter 8 suggests that fasts are not to be on the second day and on the fifth day "with the hypocrites", but on the fourth day and on the preparation day. Fasting Wednesday and Friday plus worshiping on the Lord's day constituted the Christian week. Nor must Christians pray with their Judaic brethren; instead they shall say the Lord's Prayer three times a day. The text of the prayer is not identical to the version in the Gospel of Matthew, and it is given with the doxology "for Yours is the power and the glory forever." This doxology derives from 1 Chronicles 29:11–13; Bruce M. Metzger held that the early church added it to the Lord's Prayer, creating the current Matthew reading.

==== Daily prayer ====
The Didache provides one of the few clues historians have in reconstructing the daily prayer practice among Christians before the 300s. It instructs Christians to pray the "Our Father" three times a day but does not specify times to pray. Recalling the version of Matthew 6:9–13, it affirms "you must not pray like the hypocrites, but you should pray as follows." Other early sources speak of two-fold, three-fold, and five-fold daily prayers.

==== Eucharist ====
The Didache includes two primitive and unusual prayers for the Eucharist ("thanksgiving"), which is the central act of Christian worship. It is the earliest text to refer to this rite as the Eucharist.

Chapter 9 begins:

Now concerning the Eucharist, give thanks this way. First, concerning the cup:
We thank thee, our Father, for the holy vine of David Thy servant, which Thou madest known to us through Jesus Thy Servant; to Thee be the glory for ever...

And concerning the broken bread:

We thank Thee, our Father, for the life and knowledge which Thou madest known to us through Jesus Thy Servant; to Thee be the glory for ever. Even as this broken bread was scattered over the hills, and was gathered together and became one, so let Thy Church be gathered together from the ends of the earth into Thy kingdom; for Thine is the glory and the power through Jesus Christ for ever.
But let no one eat or drink of your Eucharist, unless they have been baptized into the name of the Lord; for concerning this also the Lord has said, "Give not that which is holy to the dogs."

The Didache basically describes the same ritual as the one that took place in Corinth. As with Paul's First Letter to the Corinthians, the Didache confirms that the Lord's supper was literally a meal, probably taking place in a "house church". The order of cup and bread differs both from present-day Christian practice and from that in the New Testament accounts of the Last Supper, of which, again unlike almost all present-day Eucharistic celebrations, the Didache makes no mention.

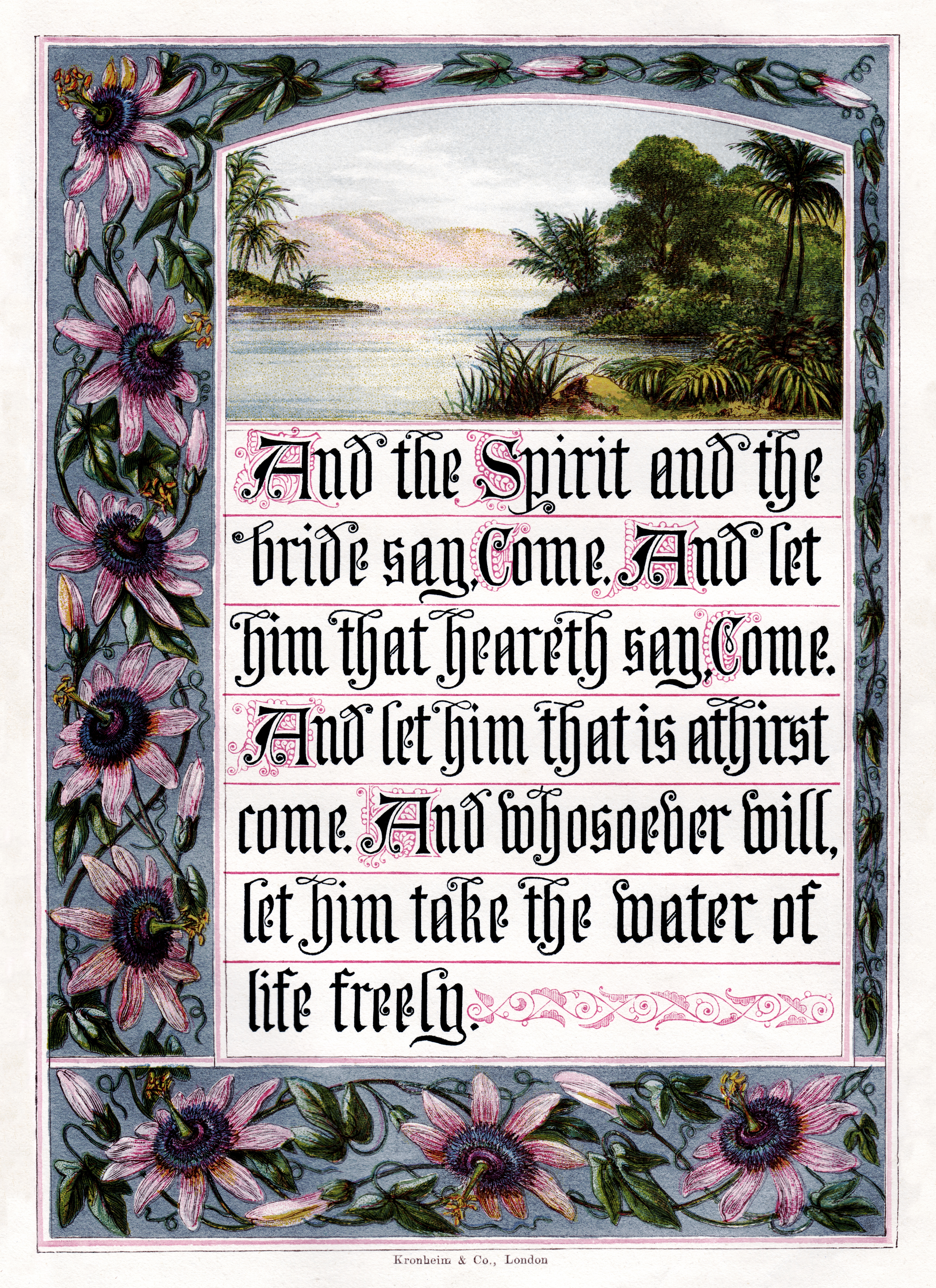
Revelation 22:17 (KJV), to which the prayer in Didache 10 bears some similarity

Chapter 10 gives a thanksgiving after a meal. The contents of the meal are not indicated: chapter 9 does not exclude other elements as well that the cup and bread, which are the only ones it mentions, and chapter 10, whether it was originally a separate document or continues immediately the account in chapter 9, mentions no particular elements, not even wine and bread. Instead it speaks of the "spiritual food and drink and life eternal through Thy Servant" that it distinguishes from the "food and drink (given) to men for enjoyment that they might give thanks to (God)". After a doxology, as before, come the apocalyptic exclamations: "Let grace come, and let this world pass away. Hosanna to the God (Son) of David! If any one is holy, let him come; if any one is not so, let him repent. Maranatha. Amen". The prayer is reminiscent of Revelation 22:17–20 and 1 Corinthians 16:22.

John Dominic Crossan endorses John W. Riggs' proposal in a 1984 The Second Century article that "there are two quite separate eucharistic celebrations given in Didache 9–10, with the earlier one now put in second place". The section beginning at 10.1 is a reworking of the Jewish birkat ha-mazon, a three-strophe prayer at the conclusion of a meal, which includes a blessing of God for sustaining the universe, a blessing of God who gives the gifts of food, earth, and covenant, and a prayer for the restoration of Jerusalem; the content is "Christianized", but the form remains Jewish. It is similar to the Syrian Church eucharist rite of the Holy Qurbana of Addai and Mari, belonging to "a primordial era when the euchology of the Church had not yet inserted the Institution Narrative in the text of the Eucharistic Prayer".

=== Church organization ===
The church organization reflected in the Didache seems to be underdeveloped. Itinerant apostles and prophets are of great importance, serving as "chief priests" and possibly celebrating the Eucharist. Development through the ages indicates that titles changed without understanding of the workings of the various roles by later editors in the belief that the roles were interchangeable – indicating that prophetic knowledge was not operating actively during a season of "closed vision" (as in the time of Samuel), modernised titles not indicating prophetic knowledge. The text offers guidelines on how to differentiate a genuine prophet that deserves support from a false prophet who seeks to exploit the community's generosity. For example, a prophet who fails to act as he preaches is a false prophet (11:10). The local leadership consists of bishops and deacons, and they seem to be taking the place of the itinerant ministry. Christians are enjoined to gather on Sunday to break bread, but to confess their sins first as well as reconcile themselves with others if they have grievances (Chapter 14).

=== Apocalyptic prophecy ===
The Didache ends with a description of the end-times, which will be characterized by the appearance of false Prophets, schisms within the Church and, finally, the dominion over the whole Earth of "the world-deceiver", who will pretend to be "the Son of God". After these things come to pass, the Second Coming of Jesus Christ will take place:

And then shall appear the signs of the truth: first, the sign of an outspreading in heaven, then the sign of the sound of the trumpet. And third, the resurrection of the dead, but not of all: rather, as it is said, "the Lord shall come and all His saints with Him." Then shall the world see the Lord coming upon the clouds of heaven.

== Gospels and the Didache ==
Significant similarities between the Didache and the Gospel of Matthew have been found as these writings share words, phrases, and motifs. This close relationship between these two writings might suggest that both documents were created in the same historical and geographical setting.

Christopher Tuckett has argued that the Didache presupposes the existence of the Gospel of Luke, both in 1.3-2.1 and in 16.1. Allison and Davies identify the Didache's dependence on Matthew as well.

One argument that suggests a common environment is that the community of both the Didache and the gospel of Matthew was probably composed of Jewish Christians from the beginning.

The Two Ways teaching (Didache 1–6) may also have served as a pre-baptismal instruction within the community of the Didache and Matthew. Furthermore, the correspondence of the Trinitarian baptismal formula in the Didache and Matthew (Didache 7 and Matthew 28:19) as well as the similar shape of the Lord's Prayer (Didache 8 and Matthew 6:5–13) appear to reflect the use of similar oral traditions. Finally, both the community of the Didache (Didache 11–13) and Matthew (Matthew 7:15–23; 10:5–15, 40–42; 24:11,24) were visited by itinerant apostles and prophets, some of whom were heterodox.

The relationship between the two documents continues to be debated with vigor. (Note: Syreeni argues that the Didache may come from perhaps a generation later than Matthew and uses Matthew as an authoritative text. Kloppenborg raises the issue of the Didache's possible knowledge and/or use of the canonical gospels: he finds probable use of Luke though not clearly of Matthew. Both in Sandt 2005.)

== See also ==
- Ancient Church Orders
- Codex Hierosolymitanus
- Gospel of Matthew
- Gospel according to the Nazarenes
- Hebrew Gospel of Matthew
- Paedagogus
