= Epistles of Clement =

The Epistles of Clement are two letters ascribed to Clement of Rome (fl. 96):

- First Epistle of Clement;
- Second Epistle of Clement, not by the same author;

"Epistle of Clement" may also refer to:

- Ethiopic Clement, an epistle traditionally attributed as written by the apostle Peter to Clement; part of the wider Orthodox Tewahedo biblical canon
