= Canons of Hippolytus =

4th-century Christian text

The Canons of Hippolytus is a Christian text composed of 38 decrees ("canons") of the genre of the Church Orders. The work has been dated to between 336 and 340 A.D., though a slightly later date is sometimes proposed.

Egypt is regarded as the place of origin. The author is unknown, though the work presents its author as "Hippolytus, the high bishop of Rome, according to the instructions of the Apostles".

It contains instructions in regard to the choice and ordination of Christian ministers; regulations as to widows and virgins; conditions required of pagan converts; preparation for and administration of baptism, rules for the celebration of the Eucharist, for fasting, daily prayers, charity suppers, memorial meals, first-fruits, etc.

== Manuscript Tradition ==
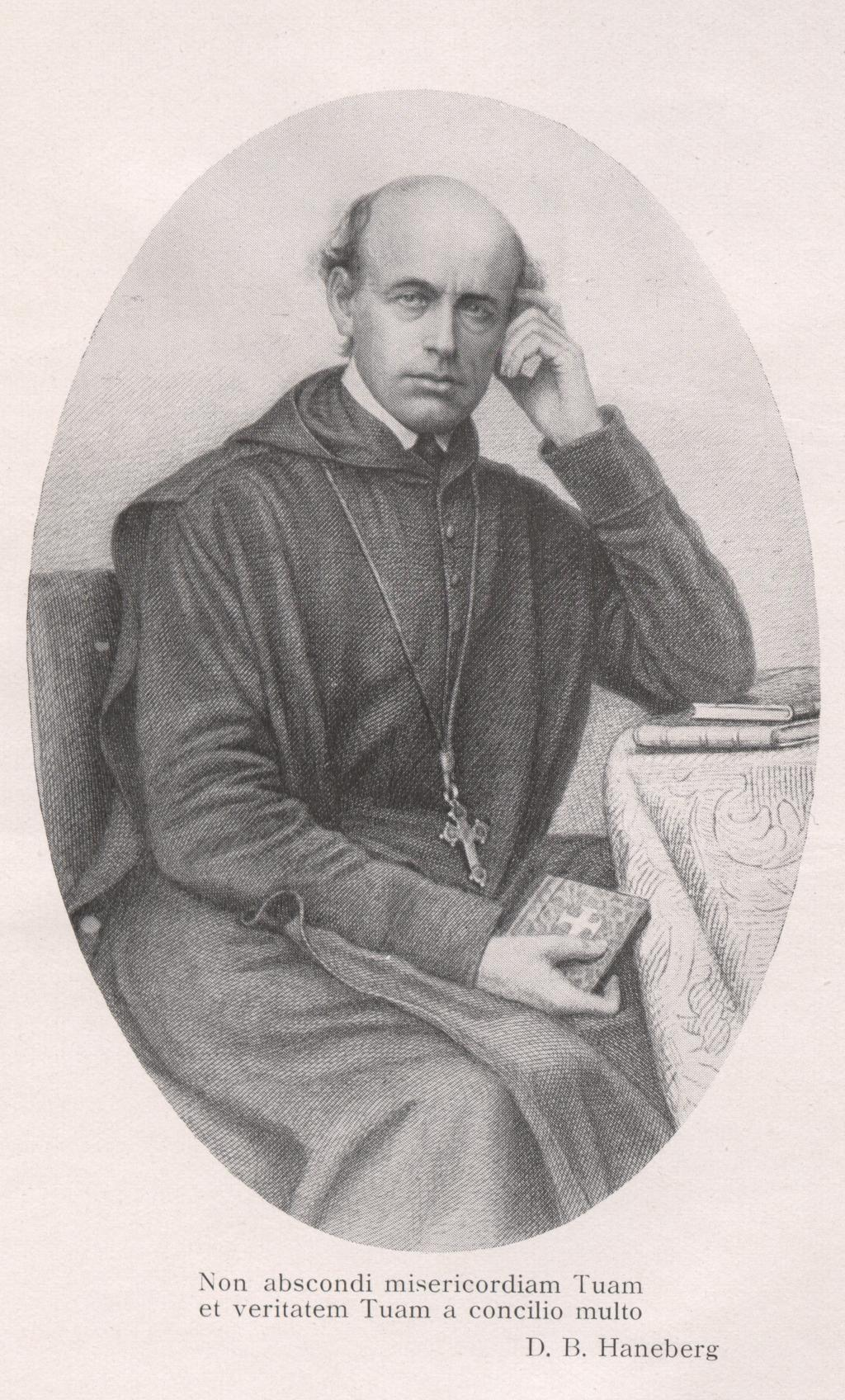
Daniel von Haneberg, who first published the Canons of Hippolytus

The Canons of Hippolytus exist only in an Arabic version, itself made from a Coptic version of the original Greek.

Attention was called to the book by Vansleb and Ludolf towards the end of the 17th century, but it was only in 1870 that it was edited by Daniel Bonifacius von Haneberg, who added a Latin translation, and so made it generally accessible. In 1891 Hans Achelis reproduced this translation in a revised form, embodying it in a synopsis of allied documents. He suspected much interpolation and derangement of order, and consequently rearranged its contents with a free hand. In 1900 a German translation was made by H. Riedel, based on fresh manuscripts. These showed that the book, as hitherto edited, had been thrown into disorder by the displacement of two pages near the end; they also removed other difficulties upon which the theory of interpolation had been based. The first critical edition was published in 1966 by René-Georges Coquin. An English translation has been published in 1987.

== Content ==
The book is divided into thirty-eight canons, to which short headings are prefixed. This division is certainly not original, but it is convenient for purposes of reference.

- Canon 1 is prefatory; it contains a brief confession of faith in the Trinity, and especially in the Word, the Son of God; and it speaks of the expulsion of heretics from the Church.
- Canons 2-5 give regulations for the selection and ordination of bishops, presbyters and deacons. The bishop is chosen by the whole congregation: "one of the bishops and presbyters" is to lay hands upon him and say a prayer which follows (3) : he is at once to proceed with "the offering," taking up the Eucharistic service at the point where the sursum corda comes in. A presbyter (4) is to be ordained with the same prayer as a bishop, "with the exception of the word bishop"; but he is given no power of ordination. The duties of a deacon are described, and the prayer of his ordination follows (5).
- Canons 6-9 deal with various classes in the Church. One who has suffered punishment for the faith (6) is to be counted a presbyter without ordination: "his confession is his ordination." Readers and sub-deacons (7) are given the Gospel, but are not ordained by laying-on of hands. A claim to ordination on the ground of gifts of healing (8) is to be admitted, if the facts are clear and the healing is from God. Widows are not ordained (9) : "ordination is for men only."
- Canons 10-15 describe conditions for the admission of converts. Certain occupations are incompatible with Christian life: only under compulsion may a Christian be a soldier.
- Canons 16-18 deal chiefly with regulations concerning women.
- Canon 19 is a long one dealing with catechumens, preparation for baptism, administration of that sacrament, and of the Eucharist for the newly baptized. The candidate is twice anointed: first, with the oil of exorcism, after he has said, with his face westward, "I renounce you, O devil, and all your following"; and, again, immediately after the baptism. As he stands in the water, he declares his faith in response to an interrogatory creed; and after each of the three clauses he is immersed. After the second anointing the bishop gives thanks "for that You hast made them worthy that they should be born again, and hast poured out your Holy Spirit upon them, so that they may belong, each one of them, to the body of the Church": he signs them with the cross on their foreheads, and kisses them. The Eucharist then proceeds: "the bishop gives them of the Body of Christ and says, This is the body of Christ, and they answer Amen"; and similarly for the cup. Milk and honey are then given to them as being " born a second time as little children." A warning is added against eating anything before communicating.
- Canons 20-22 deal with fast-days, daily services in church, and the fast of the Easter week.
- Canon 23 seems as if it closed the series, speaking, as it does, of "our brethren the bishops" who in their cities have made regulations "according to the commands of our fathers the apostles": "let none of our successors alter them; because it saith that the teaching is greater than the sea, and hath no end." There are regulations about the sick (24) who are to be visited by the bishop, "because it is a great thing for the sick that the high-priest should visit them for the shadow of Peter healed the sick."
- Canons 25-27 deal again with prayers and church-services. The "seven hours" are specified, with reasons for their observance (25): attendance at sermons is urged (26), "for the Lord is in the place where his lordship is proclaimed". When there are no prayers in church, reading at home is enjoined (27): "let the sun each morning see the book upon your knees". Prayer must be preceded by the washing of the hands. No believer must take food before communicating, especially on fast-days: only believers may communicate (28). The sacred elements must be guarded, "lest anything fall into the cup, and it be a sin unto death for the presbyters." No crumb must be dropped, "lest an evil spirit get possession of it."
- Canons 30-35 contain various rules, and specially deal with suppers for the poor and memorial feasts. Then there is a prayer for the offering of first-fruits (36); a direction that ministers shall wear fair garments at "the mysteries" (37); and a command to watch during the night of the Resurrection (38).

The last canon hereupon passes into a general exhortation to right living, which forms a sixth part of the whole book. Riedel's translation shows this for the first time as a connected whole. It falls into two parts. The first describes the true life of ordinary Christians, warning them against an empty profession and laying down many moral precepts; the second is addressed to the ascete who "wishes to belong to the rank of the angels" by living a life of solitude and poverty. The aspiring ascete is roused by an exposition of the temptations of Christ, and is especially warned against spiritual pride and contempt of other men. The book closes with an appeal for love and mutual service, based on the parables in Matthew 25:2.
