= Apostolic Tradition =

3rd-century church order by Hippolytus

The Apostolic Tradition (or Egyptian Church Order) is an early Christian treatise which belongs to the genre of the ancient Church Orders. It has been described to be of "incomparable importance as a source of information about church life and liturgy in the third century".

Rediscovered in the 19th century, it was given the name of "Egyptian Church Order". In the first half of the 20th century, this text was commonly identified with the lost Apostolic Tradition presumed to have been written by Hippolytus of Rome. Due to this attribution, and the apparent early date of the text, Apostolic Tradition played a crucial role in the liturgical reforms of many mainstream Christian bodies. The attribution of the text to Hippolytus has since become a subject of continued debate in recent scholarship.

If the Apostolic Tradition is the work of Hippolytus of Rome, it would be dated before 235 AD (when Hippolytus is believed to have suffered martyrdom) and its origin would be Rome; this date has been defended by scholars such as Brent and Stewart in recent debates over its authorship. Against this view, some scholars (see Bradshaw) believe that the key liturgical sections incorporate material from separate sources, some Roman and some not, ranging from the middle second to the fourth century, being gathered and compiled from about 375-400 AD, probably in Egypt or even Syria. Other scholars have suggested that the Apostolic Tradition portrays a liturgy that was never celebrated.

== Manuscripts and sources ==
The text was found in the late 5th century Latin manuscript known as Verona Palimpsest, where it is the third item in the collection.

An earlier and more complete Ethiopic version of the text, which was translated directly from the original Greek between the fourth and sixth centuries, was discovered in Ethiopia in 1999 within a 13th-century manuscript known as the Aksumite Collection. This manuscript is a compendium of synodical materials covering topics like canon law, liturgy, historiography, etc. It includes selected additions from the Didache and Didascalia before the concluding chapter 43. The text transmitted in the Aksumite Collection lacks the Anaphora of the Apostolic Tradition from Chapter 4. In 2025, the Ethiopic text was translated into English.

Chapter 36 of the probable Greek original text was identified in 1975 as one item in a florilegium of patristic fragments.

== Editions and publications ==
The first comprehensive critical editions were those of Gregory Dix in 1937, and then in 1946 by Bernard Botte.

== Date and place of composition ==
Recent scholarship, such as that by Bradshaw and Johnson, has called into question the degree to which the liturgical texts witnessed in the Apostolic Tradition may be taken as representing the regular forms of worship in Rome in the 3rd century. They propose that, over the centuries, later and non-Roman liturgical forms have accumulated within an older, and substantially Roman, Church Order.

== Title ==
None of the manuscript versions carry a title, and so there is no direct evidence as to how the 'Apostolic Tradition' was originally known. The quotation of chapter 36 in the Ochrid fragment is labelled, Diataxis (Ordinances) of the Holy Apostles: Given through Hippolytus; and this has been plausibly suggested as the probable title under which the whole text of the Apostolic Tradition circulated in Syria.

== Attribution to Hippolytus ==
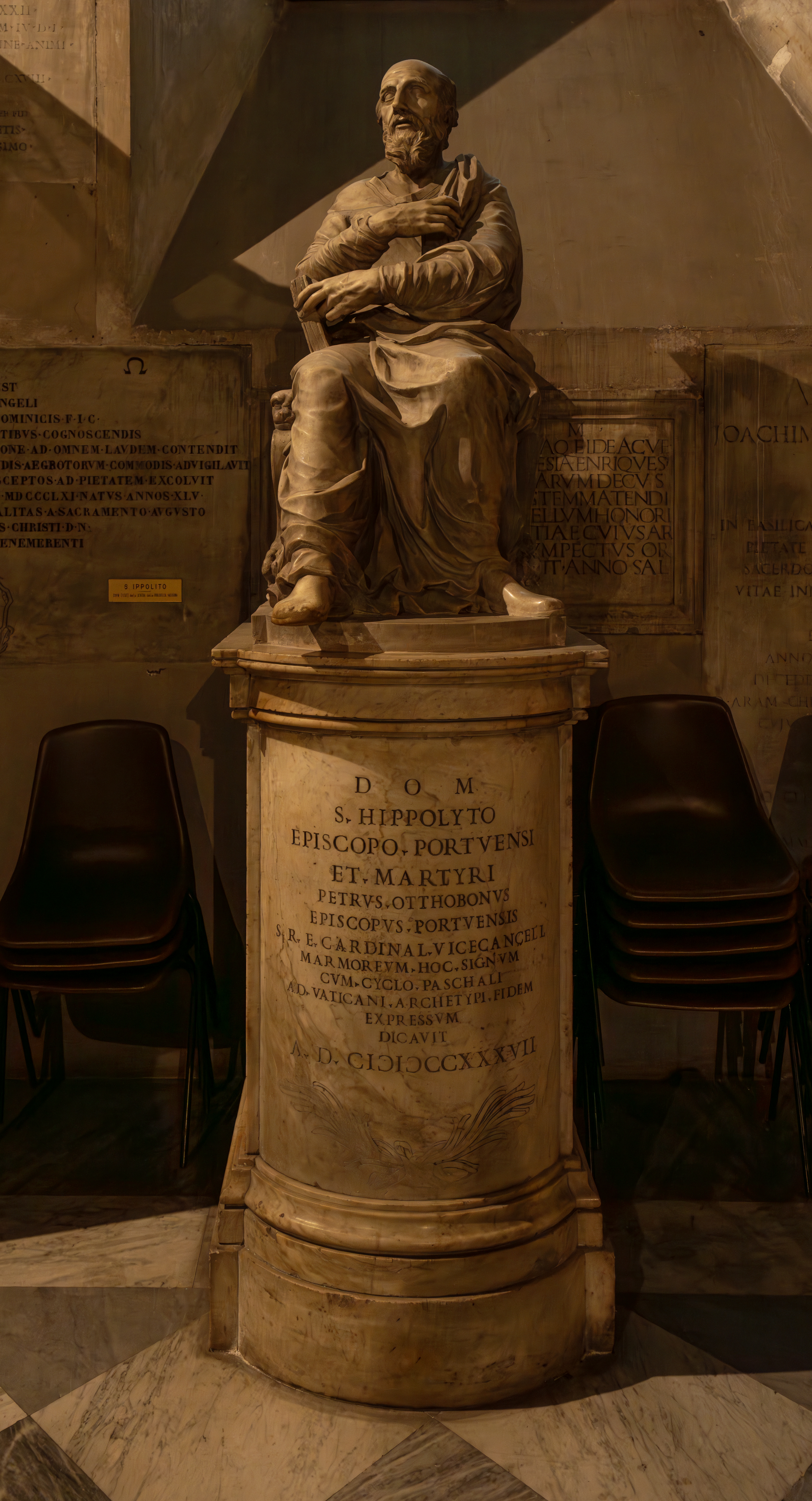
Roman sculpture, maybe of Hippolytus of Rome, found in 1551 and used for the attribution of the Apostolic Tradition

The section of the Alexandrine Sinodos, rediscovered in the 19th century, which was given the name of Egyptian Church Order, was identified with the lost Apostolic Tradition attributed to Hippolytus of Rome by Edward von der Goltz in 1906, and later by Eduard Schwartz in 1910 and by R.H. Connolly in 1916. This attribution was unanimously accepted by the scholars of that period, and became well-recognized through the works of Gregory Dix, in particular his famous The Shape of the Liturgy (1943, 1945). In addition to the above, according to Paul Bradshaw, the attribution to Hippolytus was based on the following data:

- the name Hippolytus is present in later Ancient Church Orders clearly derived from the text of the Apostolic Tradition, the Canons of Hippolytus and The Constitutions through Hippolytus.
- the term "apostolic tradition" itself is found on both the first and last page of the text.
- in 1551 Pirro Ligorio found an ancient Roman marble statue of a seated figure near Campo Verano in Rome and moved it to the Vatican Library where it still is. On one surface of the chair was a calendar carved in Greek paschal cycle, which remembered the one attributed to Hippolytus, and on another surface the titles of numerous writings, some of them by Hippolytus, and one named "On the charismata—Apostolic Tradition". This brought the scholars to presume the existence of a writing named Apostolic Tradition by Hippolytus.

More recently, the attribution of the Apostolic Tradition to Hippolytus of Rome has come under substantial criticism. According to several scholars, the Apostolic Tradition is a work written by another priest named Hippolytus, but who probably lived in Alexandria, or it contains material of separate sources ranging from the middle second to the fourth century. The reasons given to support this understanding are the following:

- the name “Hippolytus” is found in transmission of the Church Orders only about one century and half after his death;
- the reference to Hippolytus and to a tradition coming from the Apostles in later Church Orders can be easily explained as a pseudepigraphic work typical of this genre;
- the form of liturgy it describes are quite different from other information we have about the Christian liturgical uses in ancient Rome and are by far more in line with the forms of Church life in Alexandria or in Syria;
- the statue found in 1551 was without head, and the present bearded head was added later by Ligorio himself. The statue was very probably carved as a copy of a famous statue of Themista of Lampsacus, a woman. The list of engraved titles includes many works which are not by Hippolytus, while it lacks most of the works surely ascribable to him. This sculpture was probably placed in the ancient library of the Pantheon personifying one of the sciences and the engraved list could be the catalog of volumes kept nearby, a common use in Ancient Rome;
- the title engraved on the statue refers to charismata also, but the Apostolic Tradition does not deal with this topic;
- the probable original title of this treatise, according to J. Magne, was discovered in 1975 on a Greek fragment and it is not the one engraved on the statue.

== Content ==
The Apostolic Tradition, as the other Church Orders, has the aim to offer authoritative "apostolic" prescriptions on matters of moral conduct, liturgy and Church organization. It can be divided in a prologue (chapter 1) and three main sections.
