= Franz Xaver von Funk =

German Catholic theologian and historian

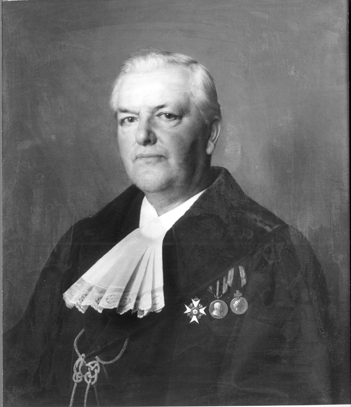
Franz Xaver Funk, 1900

Franz Xaver von Funk (22 October 1840 – 24 February 1907) was a German Catholic theologian and historian.

== Biography ==
Funk was born at Abts-Gmünd, Württemberg, and educated at Tübingen, at the seminary of Rottenburg am Neckar, and in Paris, where he studied economics. In 1870 he was appointed professor of theology at Tübingen and in 1876 became an editor of the Tübingen Theologische Quartalschrift.
