= Apostolic Church-Ordinance =

3rd-century Christian text; church order

The Apostolic Church-Ordinance (or Apostolic Church-Order, Apostolic Church-Directory or Constitutio Ecclesiastica Apostolorum) is an anonymous Oriental Orthodox Christian treatise which belongs to the genre of the Church Orders. The work can be dated at the end of 3rd century CE. The provenance is usually regarded as Egypt, or perhaps Syria.

This text served as a law-code for the Coptic, Ethiopian Orthodox and other Oriental Orthodox churches. It superseded in authority and esteem the Didache, under which name it sometimes went.

== Manuscript Tradition ==
The full and original text, in Greek, was found in a 12th-century manuscript discovered in 1843 at Vienna and published in the same year by Johann Wilhelm Bickell, which named it Apostolische Kirchenordnung. Only other four fragmentary Greek manuscripts are extant.

A complete Syriac ancient translation, with English translation, was published in 1901 by John Peter Arendzen. The Ge'ez version was first published in 1691 by Hiob Ludolf.

The Apostolic Church-Ordinance usually is found also in ancient collections of Church Orders. It is the second book in the Verona Palimpsest, it is the first book in the Alexandrine Sinodos and in the Bohairic version of the Clementine Octateuch, while the Arabic version of the Clementine Octateuch has it in the second place, and the Syriac version of it has it in the third place. Thus many early translations of the Apostolic Church-Ordinance survive in Latin, Ge'ez, Bohairic Coptic, Sahidic Coptic, Arabic and Syriac.

The titles found on the manuscripts can be different, so the Bohairic Alexandrine Sinodos version is entitled "Canons of our Fathers the Holy Apostles of our Lord Jesus Christ, which they appointed in the Churches", while the Syriac version has "Third book of Clement, Teaching of the twelve Apostles".

== Content ==
As usual in genre of the Church Orders, this texts purports to be the work of the Twelve Apostles, whose instructions, whether given by them as individuals or as a body. In antiquity this text was sometime mistakenly supposed to be gathered and handed down by the Clement of Rome.

The names of the Apostles are so listed: John, Matthew, Peter, Andrew, Philip, Simon, James, Nathanael, Thomas, Cephas, Bartholomew and Judas. The presence of both Peter and Cephas, and the first place given to John, is found also in the more ancient Epistula Apostolorum.

The content can be so summarized:

- chapters 1-3 include a short introduction inspired by the Epistle of Barnabas
- chapters 4-14 are an evident adaptation of the first six chapters of the Didache, the moral precepts of which are attributed severally to the Apostles, each of whom, introduced by the formula "John says", "Peter says", etc., is represented as framing one or more of the ordinances
- chapters 15-30 treat in similar manner of the qualifications for appointment and ordination of bishops, presbyters, reader, deacons and widowers, and this section treats also of the duties of lay male and female and of deacons.

== See also ==
- Baptist beliefs
- Egyptian Church Ordinance
- Infused righteousness
- Ordinance (Latter Day Saints)
- Sola gratia
