= Didascalia Apostolorum =

Christian treatise

Didascalia Apostolorum, or just Didascalia, is an early Christian legal treatise which belongs to the genre of the Church Orders. It presents itself as being written by the Twelve Apostles at the time of the Council of Jerusalem; however, scholars agree that it was actually a later composition, with most estimates suggesting the 3rd century, and other estimates suggesting potentially as late as the 4th century.

The Didascalia was clearly modeled on the earlier Didache. The author is unknown, but he was probably a bishop. The provenance is usually regarded as Northern Syria, possibly near Antioch.

== History ==
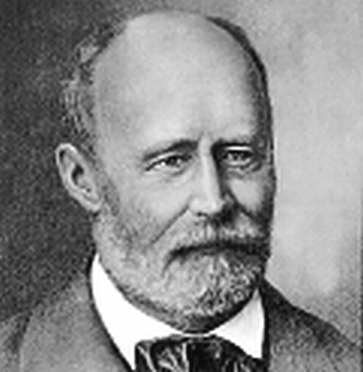
Paul de Lagarde, who first re-discovered the Didascalia

The Didascalia was probably composed in the 3rd century in Syria. The earliest mention of the work is by Epiphanius of Salamis, who believed it to be truly Apostolic. He found it in use among the Audiani, Syrian heretics. The few extracts Epiphanius gives do not quite tally with our present text, but he is notoriously inexact in his quotations. The Didascalia was used as the basis of the first six books of the Apostolic Constitutions at the end of the fourth century. At the end of the 4th century it is quoted in the Pseudo-Chrysostom's Opus Imperfectum in Matthaeum.

The work's author is unknown. R. Hugh Connolly argued the work as a unity composed by a single author; Alistair Stewart-Sykes has argued the modern form of the work came from at least two separate redactors - an unknown original document, a "deuterotic" redactor who wrote the final chapter and wrote an argument about how Jewish law was "secondary legislation" only intended as punishment for Jews, and an "apostolic redactor" whose editing increased the authority of the argument dissuading Christians from keeping Jewish law by invoking the authority of the Apostles.

The Didascalia underwent a number of translations, including into Latin and Syriac. The date of the Syriac translation is usually placed between the fourth and sixth centuries and played some role in forming a legal culture which influenced various other texts from the third through seventh centuries and thereafter, including the Quran.

== Manuscript Tradition ==
The Didascalia Apostolorum, whose lost original was in Greek, was first published in 1854 in Syriac by Paul de Lagarde. In 1900 Edmund Hauler published the Verona Palimpsest which includes a Latin translation of the Didascalia, perhaps of the fourth century, more than half of which has perished. In 1906 Franz Xaver von Funk published the texts, printed side by side, of both the Didascalia and the Apostolic Constitutions, in order to show the similarities. A short fragment of chapter 15 has been found in Greek, and in 1996 another probable fragment in Coptic.

== Contents ==
The Latin title Didascalia Apostolorum means Teaching of the Apostles, and the full title given in Syriac is: "Didascalia, that is, the teaching of the twelve Apostles and the holy disciples of our Lord". The text never touches upon dogma but concerns itself entirely with practice. In comparison with the Didache, the Didascalia moved the main focus from the moral issues to liturgical practice and church organization.

The content can be so summarized:

- Admonitions about Christian life, prayer, orphans, martyrdom (chapters 1–3, 13, 17, 19–20)
- Rules about bishops' qualifications, conduct, duties, alms (chapters 4–11, 18)
- Rules about deacons and deaconesses and widows (chapters 14–16)
- Liturgical rules about the proper place in the church-building and about fasting (chapters 12, 21)
- The education of children and the denunciation of heresy (chapters 22–23)
- The claim of the composition of the treatise by the Twelve Apostles and a condemnation of the Jewish ritual practices directed toward Jewish Christians (chapter 24–26)

The church officials are bishops, deacons, priests, widows (and orphans); deaconesses are also added, in one place rectors, and once subdeacons (these last may have been interpolated). The preface to the English translation states, "The most salient feature of the Didascalia is its exaltation of the authority of the Bishops; yet there is no mention of the Bishops of Rome as superior over other Bishops." Celibacy is preferred for bishops but not required for that office, while even the combing of hair (as well as long hair) is forbidden for men in general, lest they attract women. Especially noticeable is the treatment which bishops are ordered to give to penitents. Even great sinners, on repentance, are to be received with kindness, no sins are excepted. The canonical penance is to be of two to seven weeks. However, if a converted man "of the Jews or of the heathen" returned again to the sect in which he came from, then he was not to be received a second time into the church, but were to be regarded as unconverted. (Didascalia 20:16)

The heresies mentioned are those of Simon Magus and Cleobius (this name is given also by Hegesippus), with Gnostics and Ebionites. Against these, Christians must believe in the Trinity, the Scriptures and the Resurrection. The original Law of Moses (specifically the Ten Commandments) is to be observed, along with all the regulations given prior to the incident of the golden calf (Exo. 32). But the "Second Law," the regulations given after the incident of the Golden Calf, were given to the Jews on account of the hardness of their hearts (Did. 26). In addition, the Sabbath rest is given a symbolic content, and the Christians are admonished to instead treat every day as belonging to the Lord, but not to keep the rest literally.

The Old Testament is frequently quoted, and often at great length. The Gospel is cited by name, usually that of Matthew, the other evangelists less often, and that of John least of all. The Acts of the Apostles and nearly all the Epistles are freely employed, including the Epistle to the Hebrews. None of these could be named. Besides the Didache, the Didascalia utilizes other ancient Christian documents as the Acts of Paul and the Gospel of Peter.

Concerning baptism, particular emphasis is placed on the pre-baptismal anointing of a catechumen. Chapters 9 and 16 give detailed instructions for anointing, including the laying on of hands by a bishop and the recitation of Psalm 2:7. After being baptized with the proper invocation, the convert is permitted to partake of the eucharist.

== Situation of the 3rd century Church ==
One of the main unknown aspects of the Didascalia is the degree to which it is descriptive and simply writing down what was already standard practice in Christian groups of Asia Minor at the time, and the degree to which it is prescriptive and advocating changes or new doctrines. Its use as a source on the early Church varies based on which is believed to be true - if a passage is prescriptive, then that implies the opposite of the teaching was practiced, and the author was invoking the authority of the apostles to advocate against that existing practice.

A notable example of this tension is the Didascalia's depiction of the status of women in the early Church, especially widows. The Didascalia takes a dim view of the status of Christian women: widows should not remarry more than once, should not be talkative or loud, should not instruct in doctrine, should stay at home and not wander, are not allowed to baptize, and should not engage in ministry unless ordered to by a bishop or deacon. Scholars who endorse the view that the Didascalia is largely prescriptive believe these specific prohibitions suggest that at least some Christian communities of the era did allow women such freedoms to evangelize, engage in ministry and baptisms of others, and so on, and the author found such practices sufficiently distasteful to write that the apostles forbade such acts.

=== Tensions with Jewish Christianity ===
A major theme of the Didascalia is third century tensions with Jewish Christians - that is, Jewish Christians who kept Jewish Law, such as abstaining from pork, resting on the Sabbath, circumcising their children, and so on. A large amount of the text is devoted to teachings for how continuing to keep the Jewish Law was not merely unproductive, but actively immoral. As noted above, any laws given after the golden calf incident are to be understood as punishment for the Jewish people; continuing to keep them makes a Christian "guilty of the worship of the calf" and "asserting the curse against Our Savior. You are ensnared in the bonds and so are guilty of the woe as an enemy of the Lord God." (Didascalia 26) Resting on the Sabbath is merely proof that Jews are "idle". For the author of the Didascalia, Jesus's death abolished and abrogated the "secondary legislation", and thus attempting to keep such Jewish Law was denying the power of Jesus's sacrifice.

One possibility raised by some scholars is that the author himself may have been raised in the Jewish tradition, judging by his familiarity with some of the rabbinic tradition and the style of Jewish argument in the era — even if this familiarity is used to vociferously argue against the keeping of the Jewish law. Charlotte Fonrobert argued the text is a "counter-Mishnah for the disciples of Jesus", a Jewish text opposing other Jews.

The version of the Didascalia included as books 1–6 of the 4th-century Apostolic Constitutions shows some differences as a result of editing. The editor who compiled the Apostolic Constitutions appears to have had a somewhat more positive view of Judaism than the author of the Didascalia, and toned down some of its rhetoric. Notably, the version in the Apostolic Constitutions does not portray Jewish Law as always burdensome and a curse. In it, some of Jewish Law is still "alien" and "bonds for unbelievers". However, some of its laws may in fact be good and necessary for the Christian community, rather than the blanket dismissal seen in the Didascalia. As an example, it expresses an early Christian Sabbatarianism that suggests observing the Sabbath as a day of rest is in fact healthy for Christians. This is in contrast to the Didascalia, which considered observation of the Sabbath by Christians a dangerous and heretical misunderstanding.

== Published editions ==
Syriac

- Gibson, Margaret Dunlop (1903). The Didascalia Apostolorum in Syriac: Edited from a Mesopotamian manuscript with various readings and collations of other MSS. Horae semiticae. Vol. 1. London: C. J. Clay.

English

- Gibson, Margaret Dunlop (1903). The Didascalia Apostolorum in English: Translated from the Syriac. Horae semiticae. Vol. 2. London: C. J. Clay.
- Connolly, R. Hugh (1929). Didascalia Apostolorum: The Syriac Version Translated and Accompanied by the Verona Latin Fragments. Oxford, UK: Clarendon Press. Reprinted as Connolly, R. Hugh (2010). Didascalia Apostolorum: The Syriac Version: Translated and Accompanied by the Verona Latin Fragments. Ancient Texts and Translations. Wipf & Stock Publishers. ISBN 978-1-55635-669-8.
- Vööbus, Arthur (1979). The Didascalia Apostolorum in Syriac. Corpus scriptorum Christianorum Orientalium (in English and Syriac). Secrétariat du CorpusSCO. ISBN 978-2-8017-0104-1. (2 volumes)
- Stewart-Sykes, Alistair (2009). The Didascalia Apostolorum: An English Version. Studia Traditionis Theologiae: Explorations in Early and Medieval Theology. Brepols Publishers. ISBN 978-2-503-52993-6.

German

- Didaskalia: 1840,7/12 (in German). Bad. Post. 1840.
- Didaskalia: 1842 (in German). Bad. Post. 1842.
- Die syrische Didaskalia: collig. 2 [The Syrian Didaskalia: collig. 2]. Die ältesten Quellen des orientalischen Kirchenrechts (in German). Hinrichs. 1904.
- Achelis, Hans; Flemming, Johs (1904). Die Syrische Didaskalia: übersetzt und erklärt [The Syrian Didaskalia: Translated and explained]. Texte und Untersuchungen zur Gesch.d.altchristl. Literatur (Texts and Investigations: History of the Old Christian Literature) (in German). J.C. Hinrichs. ISBN 978-0-7905-4030-6 – via Google Books.

Other languages

- de Lagarde, Paul (1854). Didascalia Apostolorum Syriace (in Latin and Syriac). Leipzig: B. G. Teubner.
- de Lagarde, Paul (1854). Didascalia apostolorum Syriace (in Latin and Syriac). Leipzig: B. G. Teubner.
- Hauler, Édmund (1900). Didascaliae apostolorum: Fragmenta ueronensia Latina: Accedunt canonum qui dicuntur apostolorum et Aegyptiorum reliquies (in Latin). Teubneri – via Internet Archive.
- Hauler, Édmund (1900). Didascaliae apostolorum: Fragmenta ueronensia Latina: Praefatio. Fragmenta. Imagines. Didascaliae apostolorum fragmenta ueronensia Latina: Accedunt canonum qui dicuntur apostolorum et Aegyptiorum reliquies (in Latin). Teubneri.
- Funk, Francis Xavier (1905). Didascalia et Constitutiones apostolorum (in Latin). Vol. 1. in libraria Ferdinandi Schoeningh. Alternate scan
- Bartlet, James Vernon (1917). Fragments of the Didascalia Apostolorum in Greek.
- Connolly, R. Hugh (1929). The Didascalia apostolorum in Syriac version translated and accompanied by the Verona Latin fragments. Corpus scriptorum Christianorum Orientalium. Clarendon Press.
- Tidner, Erik (1963). Didascalia apostolorum. Canonum ecclesiasticorum, Traditionis apostolicae: versiones latinae. Recensuit Erik Tidner (in Latin). Akademie-Verlag.
