= Paul de Lagarde =

German biblical scholar and orientalist (1827–1891)

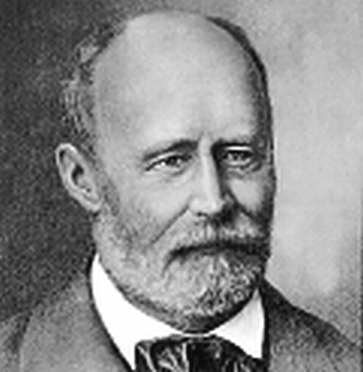
- Paul Anton de Lagarde
- Born: Paul Bötticher; 2 November 1827; Berlin, Prussia
- Died: 22 December 1891 (aged 64); Göttingen, Germany
- Occupations: Orientalist, Biblical scholar
- Father: Wilhelm Bötticher

Paul Anton de Lagarde (born Paul Bötticher, 2 November 1827 – 22 December 1891) was a German biblical scholar and orientalist. He is regarded as one of the greatest orientalists of the 19th century. Lagarde authored dozens of books, many on politics. His anti-Semitism, anti-Slavism, and aversion to traditional Christianity were influential precursors of Nazism.

== Life and career ==
Paul Bötticher was born in Berlin on November 2, 1827. His father, Johann Friedrich Wilhelm Bötticher, was a philologist who taught languages at the Friedrich Wilhelm Gymnasium. His mother, Luise, was only eighteen years old. Luise died several days after Paul was born. Wilhelm was bereft. He blamed his newborn son for the loss and treated him miserably. Paul's woeful upbringing led him to feel nothing upon his father's death. Two aunts of Luise nurtured Paul emotionally and financially. One of them, Ernestine de Lagarde, eventually adopted Paul.

Bötticher attended Humboldt University of Berlin from 1844–1846 where he studied Oriental languages, theology, and philosophy under professors like Ernst Wilhelm Hengstenberg, who was a friend of his father. His primary mentor was Friedrich Rückert. He attended the University of Halle-Wittenberg from 1846–7.

In 1852, Bötticher received a 1,000 thaler grant from King Frederick William IV to study abroad. He used it to travel to London to work at the British Museum. He lodged at the Prussian Embassy in London and worked part time as Ambassador von Bunsen's secretary. On his way home in January 1853, Bötticher stayed in Paris to work in the Bibliothèque nationale. He relied on Ernest Renan to check out manuscripts for him. The Syriac texts he studied while abroad led to the publication of Didascalia apostolorum syriace in 1854.

That year, Bötticher married Anna Berger. He also decided to change his name to Paul de Lagarde in honor of his mother's family and to move past his painful childhood. He had already published several volumes under his birth name.

In 1855, Paul de Lagarde taught languages at Köllnisches Gymnasium in Berlin where his duties included teaching gymnastics. He continued to publish scholarly work, much of it at his own expense. In 1858, he transferred to the Friedrichswerdersches Gymnasium. In 1866, he was given three years leave for research. In 1869, he took over Heinrich Ewald's professorship of oriental languages at the University of Göttingen.

The decade it took to become a professor deepened the bitterness Lagarde already felt over his childhood. He was dogmatic and distrustful of others. Lagarde shunned professional affiliations and frequently attacked colleagues and peers. In a letter to Adolf Hilgenfeld, Lagarde described himself as an "anchorite", simultaneously lamenting and imposing his self-isolation.

Lagarde was diagnosed with colon cancer in 1891 and kept the diagnosis secret. He had an operation to treat it on 19 December. It was unsuccessful, and he died three days later. His own eulogist, Ulrich von Wilamowitz-Moellendorff, described Lagarde as a lonely man who sowed the wind and reaped the storm.

== Scholarship ==
Paul de Lagarde's father Wilhelm Bötticher was a prolific scholar. Lagarde loathed the assembly-line nature of his father's writing. Ironically, he would be similarly overproductive, writing many works that were underbaked. He wrote dozens of books on a broad range of topics, moving fluidly between multiple languages. His main focus was elucidation of the Bible. A bibliography of his work was prepared in 1892, and it ran to eighteen pages.

In 1865, he set a massive goal of creating a critical edition of the Septuagint. The project obsessed him for most of his career. Just before his death, Lagarde showed his pupil Alfred Rahlfs his plans for the project so that his work could continue. Lagarde relied on the Codex Reuchlinianus to produce Prophetae chaldaice (1872), a text of Targum Jonathan. He did this work in fierce opposition of the relatively new Wissenschaft des Judentums approach.

Lagarde's studies of Arabic language manuscripts are still widely cited. He edited an Arabic translation of the Gospels (Die vier Evangelien, 1864), a Syriac translation of the Old Testament Apocrypha (Libri V. T. Apocryphi Syriace, 1861), and a Coptic translation of the Pentateuch (Der Pentateuch Koptisch, 1867).

Lagarde published an edition of Eusebius' Onomasticon in 1870.

He was also a student of Persian, publishing Isaias Persice (1883) and Persische Studien (1884). In 1880, de Lagarde attempted to reconstruct a Syriac version of Epiphanius' treatise On Weights and Measures. He published manuscripts of Coptic apocrypha as Aegyptiaca in 1883.

Lagarde published several volumes of miscellany such as Gesammelte Abhandlungen (1866), Symmicta (I. 1877, II. 1880), Semitica (I. 1878, II. 1879), Orientalia (1879–1880) and Mittheilungen (1884).

== Political writing ==
Lagarde was a member of the Prussian Conservative Party until 1849 when it fabricated evidence of treason against Benedikt Waldeck. He became deeply disenchanted and politically unaligned. Lagarde supported the unification of Germany in 1871, but the spirit of the new country dissatisfied him. He began to write about politics, and in 1874, Lagarde published Politische Aufsätze (Political Essays). He sent a copy to Thomas Carlyle who responded with an admiring letter.

The opening essay was first delivered as a lecture in November 1853. It proposes a German colonization of Europe to create a Mitteleuropa. Though he also writes with the casual antisemitism that was widespread at the time, Lagarde expresses admiration for the discipline of Jewish life. He specifically points to Judaism as an example of how a national religion benefits a population. The book's second essay plays out this theme of a national religion. Lagarde calls for a radical morality where actions are solely "duty or sin".

Lagarde's views of religion were incoherent. He prized the rituals of religion and ongoing revelation. He viewed the Bible as a bricolage of dubious texts. He admired the early iteration of Christianity but despised what Catholicism had become, and he ridiculed Protestantism as an elaborate fantasy.

Lagarde had a similarly vague sense of national identity. In 1875, he wrote, "Germany is the totality of all German-feeling, German-thinking, German-willing Germans: In this sense, every one of us is a traitor if he does not consider himself personally accountable in every moment of his life for the existence, fortune and future of the fatherland, and each is a hero and liberator if he does."

As Lagarde aged, the bitterness he felt about so much of life also hardened his antisemitism. His rhetoric advanced well beyond the prevailing prejudice into a conspiratorial fever. He corresponded with Adolf Stoecker, the founder of the antisemitic 1880s Berlin movement. He also showed interest in Völkisch antisemitic societies, including Bernhard Förster and Max Liebermann von Sonnenberg's Deutscher Volksverein, and Theodor Fritsch's Deutschsoziale Partei.

Lagarde considered Jews to be the greatest barrier to German greatness, and he suggested they be moved to Madagascar. In 1887, he wrote, "One would have to have a heart of steel to not feel sympathy for the poor Germans and, by the same token, to not hate the Jews, to not hate and despise those who – out of humanity! – advocate for the Jews or are too cowardly to crush these vermin. Trichinella and bacilli would not be negotiated with, trichinella and bacilli would also not be nurtured, they would be destroyed as quickly and as thoroughly as possible." He also despised Slavs and wrote, "the sooner they perish the better it will be for us and them".

In 1878, Lagarde first collected his political essays in Deutsche Schriften (German Writings). He published a second volume in 1881 and a combined edition in 1886. Fritz Stern zeroed in on the aimless nature of these writings:

"He wrote as a prophet; he neither reasoned nor exposited, but poured out his excoriations and laments, his intuitive truths and promises. There was nothing limpid or systematic in his work; within each essay he skipped from subject to subject, alternating abstract generalities and concrete proposals. The pervasive mood of the book was despair and the dominant tone a kind of whiny heroism."

== Legacy ==
Lagarde was the most renowned Septuagint scholar of the nineteenth century. A 1920 handbook of Septuagint studies concluded that Lagarde's work set the modern standard for the field. Shortly after his death, The New York Times described Lagarde as "the most remarkable writer on Semitic studies that the world has ever known". Lagarde bequeathed his library to the Royal Society of Sciences in Göttingen. When John Dyneley Prince was alerted that it was for sale and would immediately bestow the owner with the best Oriental library in America, he arranged for New York University to purchase it for $7,000 in 1893.

In 1894, Lagarde's wife Anna published many of his letters in a memoir of her husband.

Deutsche Schriften was widely read by figures like Thomas Mann and Theodor Heuss. Tomáš Masaryk regarded Lagarde as one of the leading philosophical and theological spokesmen of the German Drang nach Osten project that threatened the Slavic countries. Masaryk grouped Lagarde with Heinrich von Treitschke as the movement's historian, Wilhelm II as its politician, and Friedrich Ratzel as its geographer.

Lagarde's writings foreshadowed much of the Nazi Party platform when it emerged in 1920. His imperialism prefigured Ratzel's concept of Lebensraum, which was taken up by the Nazis. Nazi theorist Alfred Rosenberg was heavily influenced by Lagarde's writings. Rosenberg's notion of positive Christianity directly descended from Lagarde. The Nazi Madagascar Plan for the forcible relocation of Jews originates from what is essentially a wisecrack in Lagarde's 1885 book Die nächsten Pflichten deutscher Politik.

The University of Göttingen maintains Lagarde's former residence as a facility for its Septuagint collections. The University's Student Union has requested the house be renamed.

== Selected works ==
As Paul Boetticher

- Horae aramaicae. Berlin: prostat apud C. Grobe, 1847.
- Rudimenta Mythologiae Semiticae Supplementa Lexici Aramaici. Berlin: G. Thome, 1848.
- Initia Chromatologiae Arabicae. Berlin: Excudebant Trowitzschius et filius, 1849.
- Arica. Halle: J.F. Lippert. 1851.
- Hymns of the Old Catholic Church of England. Halle: J.F. Lippert. 1851.
- Acta Apostolorum. Halle: J.F. Lippert. 1852.
- Epistulae Novi Testamenti, Coptice. Halle: E. Anton. 1852.
- Wurzelforschungen. Halle: J.F. Lippert. 1852.

As Paul Lagarde

- Zur Urgeschichte der Armenier: Ein philologischer Versuch. Austria, W. Hertz, 1854.
- Didascalia Apostolorum Syriace. Leipzig: B. G. Teubner, 1854.
- Libris Veteris Testamenti Apocryphi Syriace. Lipsiae: F.A. Brockhausen, 1861.
- Die Vier Evangelien Arabisch. Leipzig : F. A. Brockhaus, 1864.
- Gesammelte Abhandlungen. Leipzig: F.A. Brockhause, 1866.
- Der Pentateuch Koptische. Leipzig: B.G. Teubner, 1867.
- Onomastica Sacra, Vol. I & II. Gottingae, 1870.

2nd edition, 1887.

- Armenische Studien. Göttingen: Dieterich’sche Verlagsbuchhandlung, 1877.
- Semitica I & II. Göttingen: Dieterich’sche Verlagsbuchhandlung, 1878/9.
- Symmicta I & II. Göttingen: Dieterich’sche Verlagsbuchhandlung, 1877/80.
- Orientalia I & II. Göttingen: Dieterich’sche Verlagsbuchhandlung, 1879/80.
- Veteris Testamenti. Gottingae: W.F. Kaestneri, 1880.
- Aegyptiaca. Gottingae: A. Hoyer, 1883.
- Mittheilungen I & II, & III. Göttingen: Dieterich’sche Verlagsbuchhandlung, 1884/7/9.
- Deutsche Schriften. Göttingen: Dieterich’sche Verlagsbuchhandlung, 1892.

As editor:

- Alcalá, Pedro de. Petri Hispani de Lingua Arabica libri duo. Göttingen: Arnoldi Hoyer, 1883.
