= Collections of ancient canons =

Overview of ancient Christian laws

Collections of ancient canons contain collected bodies of canon law that originated in various documents, such as papal and synodal decisions, and that can be designated by the generic term of canons.

Canon law was not a finished product from the beginning, but rather a gradual growth. This is especially true of the earlier Christian centuries. Such written laws as existed were not originally universal laws, but local or provincial statutes. Hence arose the necessity of collecting or codifying them. Earlier collections are brief and contain few laws that are chronologically certain. Only with the increase of legislation did a methodical classification become necessary.

These collections may be genuine (e. g. the Versio Hispanica), or apocryphal, i.e. made with the help of documents forged, interpolated, wrongly attributed or otherwise defective (e. g. the Pseudo-Isidore collection). They may be official and authentic (i.e. promulgated by competent authority) or private, the work of individuals. The forged collections of the middle of the ninth century are treated in the article on False Decretals. (Note: Much of our knowledge of these matters is owing to the historical researches begun at the end of the sixteenth century, whence issued the critical editions of the Church Fathers, the councils, and the papal decretals. See: the dissertation (Patrologia Latina, LVI) of the Ballerini brothers of Verona (eighteenth century) "Concerning the ancient collection and collectors of Canons as far as Gratian"; and the history of the sources and literature of canon law by Maassen (1870); he stops at Pseudo-Isidore.)

== From the earliest to the apocryphal collections ==
=== Apostolic period ===
In the primitive Christian ages there were apocryphal collections attributed to the Apostles, which belong to the genre of the Church Orders. The most important of these are the Doctrine of the Twelve Apostles, the Apostolic Constitutions, and the Apostolic Canons.

The Apostolic Constitutions, though originally accepted throughout the Orient, were declared apocryphal in the Trullan Council of 692; they were never accepted as ecclesiastical law in the West. The Apostolic Canons (eighty-five) were, on the other hand, approved by the Trullan Council.

Dionysius Exiguus, a Western canonist of the first half of the sixth century, noted that "many accept with difficulty the so-called canons of the Apostles". Nevertheless, he admitted into his collection the first fifty of these canons. The so-called Decretum Gelasianum, de libris non recipiendis (about the sixth century), puts them among the apocrypha.

From the collection of Dionysius Exiguus they passed into many Western collections, though their authority was never on one level. They were admitted at Rome in the ninth century in ecclesiastical decisions but in the eleventh century Cardinal Humbert accepts only the first fifty. Only two of them (20, 29) found their way into the Decretals of Gregory IX.

=== Papal decretals ===
In primitive Christian centuries, the popes carried on ecclesiastical government by means of an active and extensive correspondence. A synod of the year 370, under Pope Damasus, mentions that the minutes of their letters or decretals were kept in the papal archives; these Vatican Archives have perished up to the time of pope John VIII (died 882). In the eighteenth and nineteenth centuries attempts were made to reconstruct them. (Note: The most successful is that of Jaffé (1885); cf. the important revision of Jaffé by Kehr (1906)) During the period under discussion (i. e. to the middle of the eleventh century) there was a constant use of the papal decretals by the compilers of canonical collections from the sixth century on.

=== Greek collections ===
In 451 there was quoted at the Council of Chalcedon a collection of councils no longer extant, nor has the name of the compiler ever transpired. (Note: It seems to have been based on the canons of Ancyra (314) and Neo-Cæsarea (314–25), to which were added later those of Gangra (36-70).) At the beginning of the collection were then placed the decrees of Nicæa (325); subsequently the canons of Antioch (341) were included, in which shape it was known to the Fathers of Chalcedon. In the latter part of the fifth century the canons of Laodicæa (343–81), Constantinople (381), Ephesus (431) and Chalcedon (451), were incorporated with this ecclesiastical code, and finally (after the canons of Neo-Cæsarea) the decrees of Sardica (343–44), in which form the collection was in use during the sixth century. Though unofficial in character, it represents (inclusive of sixty-eight canons taken from the "Canonical Epistles" of St. Basil, I, III) the conciliar discipline of the Greek Church between 500 and 600.

This collection was chronological in order. Towards 535 an unknown compiler classified its materials in a methodical way under sixty titles, and added to the canons twenty-one imperial constitutions relative to ecclesiastical matters taken from the Code of Justinian. This collection has been lost.

Some years later (540–550) Johannes Scholasticus, Patriarch of Constantinople, made use of this code to compile a new methodical collection, which he divided into fifty books. (Note: It is printed in the second volume of Voel & Justel (1661).) After the emperor's death (565), the patriarch extracted from ten of the former's constitutions, known as Novellæ, some eighty-seven chapters and added them to the aforesaid collection.

In this way arose the mixed collections known as Nomocanons (Greek nomoi "laws", kanones "canons"), containing not only ecclesiastical laws but also imperial laws pertaining to the same matters. The first of these was published under Emperor Maurice (582–602); under each title were given, after the canons, the corresponding civil laws. (Note: This collection (wrongly attributed to the aforementioned patriarch) is also found in the second volume of Voel & Justel (1661).)

The Quinisext Council (695) of Constantinople, called Trullan from the hall of the palace (in trullo) where it was held, issued 102 disciplinary canons; it included also the canons of the former councils and certain patristic regulations, all of which it considered constitutive elements of the ecclesiastical law of the East. This collection contains, therefore, an official enumeration of the canons which then governed the Eastern Church, but no official approbation of a given collection or particular text of these canons. The Apostolic See never fully approved this council. In 787 a similar recapitulation of the ancient canons was made by the Second Council of Nicæa.

=== Italo-Latin collections ===
==== Latin Version of the Canons of Nicæa and Sardica ====
The former council (325) was held in repute throughout the West, where its canons were in vigour together with those of Sardica, the complement of the anti-Arian legislation of Nicæa, and whose decrees had been drawn up originally in both Latin and Greek. The canons of the two councils were numbered in running order, as though they were the work of but one council (a trait met with in divers Latin collections), which explains why the Council of Sardica is sometimes called œcumenical by earlier writers, and its canons attributed to the Council of Nicæa. (Note: For the text of the version as found in the various collections see Maassen (1870), p. 8.) The oldest versions of these canons quoted in the papal decretals are no longer extant.

==== The "Hispana" or "Isidoriana" Version ====
Towards the middle of the fifth century, perhaps earlier, there appeared a Latin version of the aforesaid canons of Nicæa, Ancyra, Neo-Cæsarea and Gangra, to which were added a little later those of Antioch, Laodicea and Constantinople; the canons of Sardica were inserted about the same time after those of Gangra. Bickell considers it possible that this version was made in Northern Africa, while Walter inclines to Spain; it is now generally believed that the version was made in Italy. It was long believed, however, that it came from Spain, hence the name of "Hispana" or "Isidoriana", the latter term derived from its insertion in the collection attributed to St. Isidore of Seville (see below, Spanish Collections), in which it was edited, of course according to the text followed by the Spanish compiler.

==== The "Prisca" or "Itala" Version ====
This too seems to have grown up gradually in the course of the fifth century, and in its present shape exhibits the aforementioned canons of Ancyra, Neo-Cæsarea, Nicæa, Sardica, Gangra, Antioch, Chalcedon and Constantinople. It came to be known as "Itala" from the place of its origin, and as "Prisca" because of an overhasty conclusion that Dionysius Exiguus referred to it in the preface of his first collection when he wrote: "Laurentius offended by the confusion that reigned in the ancient version [priscœ versionis]". (Note: It was edited by Voel and Henri Justel in the first volume of their above-quoted "Bibliotheca juris canonici veteris"; a better text is that of the Ballerini brothers in the third volume of their edition of the works of St. Leo. Patrologia Latina LVI, 746.)

==== "Collectio canonum Quesnelliana" ====
At the beginning of the sixth century there arose in Italy an extensive collection, based apparently on the "Antiqua Isidoriana" and the African collections, and which, besides the earliest Eastern and the African councils, includes papal decretals (especially Leonine), letters of Gallican bishops and other documents. Older scholarship, beginning with the Ballerinis, argued that the "Quesnelliana" was a Gallic collection, though one with an admittedly "Roman colour". More recent scholarship has argued for an Italian, possibly even Roman origin. Its name is derived from the Oratorian P. Quesnel, its first editor. With its focus on Chalcedon and the letters of Leo, the "Quesnelliana" is quite obviously meant as a manifesto against the Acacian schism, in which eastern Bishops led by Acacius, patriarch of Constantinople, challenged the decisions of the council of Chalcedon and the Christology set down in Pope Leo's "Tomus". The compiler's principal of selection thus seems to have been any and all documents that support doctrinal unity in general and Leonine Christology in particular. Of the large chronological canon collections to have come out of the early Middle Ages, the "Quesnelliana" is perhaps the oldest surviving collection and, after the "Collectio Dionysiana" and "Collectio Hispana", probably the most influential. It remained a popular work well into the ninth century, particularly in Francia. Most likely this was because of the numerous papal letters it contained that dealt with disciplinary matters that retained ecclesiastical importance throughout the Middle Ages. The Quesnelliana played a particularly important role in the spread of Leo's letters in Western canonistic literature, and was notably instrumental in the compilations of pseudo-Isidore for just this reason. Manuscript evidence alone indicates that the Quesnelliana had a fairly wide dissemination in Gaul during the eighth and ninth centuries; though it had perhaps already found a welcome audience with Gallo-Frankish bishops in the sixth century, when it may have been used as a source (along with the "Sanblasiana") for the "Collectio Colbertina" and the "Collectio Sancti Mauri". By the mid-eighth century, the "Quesnelliana" had secured its place as an important lawbook within the Frankish episcopate, for whom it served as the primary source during the influential council of Verneuil in 755.

==== Collections of Dionysius Exiguus ====
Further collections were called for by the increasing canonical material of the Latin West in the course of the fifth century. They were far from satisfactory.

Towards 500 a Scythian monk, known as Dionysius Exiguus, who had come to Rome after the death of Pope Gelasius (496), and who was well skilled in both Latin and Greek, undertook to bring out a more exact translation of the canons of the Greek councils. In a second effort he collected papal decretals from Siricius (384–89) to Anastasius II (496–98), inclusive, anterior therefore, to Pope Symmachus (514–23). By order of Pope Hormisdas (514–23), Dionysius made a third collection, in which he included the original text of all the canons of the Greek councils, together with a Latin version of the same; but the preface alone has survived. Finally, he combined the first and second in one collection, which thus united the canons of the councils and the papal decretals; it is in this shape that the work of Dionysius has reached us. This collection opens with a table or list of titles, each of which is afterwards repeated before the respective canons; then come the first fifty canons of the Apostles, the canons of the Greek councils, the canons of Carthage (419), and the canons of preceding African synods under Aurelius, which had been read and inserted in the Council of Carthage. This first part of the collection is closed by a letter of Pope Boniface I, read at the same council, letters of Cyril of Alexandria and Atticus of Constantinople to the African Fathers, and a letter of Pope Celestine I. The second part of the collection opens likewise with a preface, in the shape of a letter to the priest Julian, and a table of titles; then follow one decretal of Siricius, twenty-one of Innocent I, one of Zozimus, four of Boniface I, three of Celestine I, seven of pope Leo I, one of Gelasius I and one of Anastasius II. The additions met with in Voel and Justel are taken from inferior manuscripts. (Note: It was first printed in the first volume of Voel & Justel (1661), re-edited by Lepelletier (Paris, 1687), and reprinted in Patrologia Latina LXVII. A more satisfactory edition is that of Cuthbert Hamilton Turner, in Ecclesiæ Occidentalis Monumenta Juris Antiquissima (Oxford, 1899–1939), vol. II, fasc. II.)

==== The Avellana collection ====
It is so called because its oldest known manuscript was bought for the abbey of Santa Croce Avellana by St. Peter Damian (died 1073), probably dates from the middle of the sixth century. It follows neither chronological nor logical order, and seems to have grown to its present shape according as the compiler met with the materials that he has transmitted to us. Nevertheless, Girolamo Ballerini and Pietro Ballerini pronounce it a valuable collection because of the great number of early canonical documents (nearly 200) that are found in no other collection.

All its texts are authentic, save eight letters from divers persons to Peter, Bishop of Antioch. The best edition is Otto Günther: Epistvlae imperatorvm pontificvm aliorvm inde ab a. CCCLXVII vsqve ad a. DLIII datae Avellana qvae dicitvr collectio. Corpus scriptorum ecclesiasticorum latinorum, vol. 35. Vindobonae: F. Tempsky, 1895.

==== Other collections ====
Despite the popularity of Dionysius Exiguus, which caused the previous compilations to be disused, several of them were preserved, as also were some other contemporary collections. (Note: See the above-quoted dissertation of the Ballerini, II, iv, and Maassen (1870), pp. 476, 526, 721.) Suffice it to mention the collection known as the "Chieti" or "Vaticana Reginæ", through which a very old and distinct version of the decrees of the Council of Nicæa has reached us. (Note: It has been edited by the Ballerini (Patrologia Latina LVI, 818).)

=== Collection of the African Church ===
==== Canons of the African Councils ====
From the Eastern Church Northern Africa received only the decrees of Nicæa (325), which it owed to Cæcilianus of Carthage, one of the Nicene Fathers. The African Church created its domestic code of discipline in its own councils. It was customary to read and confirm in each council the canons of preceding councils, in which way there grew up collections of conciliar decrees, but purely local in authority. Their moral authority, however, was great, and from the Latin collections they eventually made their way into the Greek collections. The best-known are: (a) the Canons of the Council of Carthage (August, 397) which confirmed the "Breviarium" of the canons of Hippo (393), one of the chief sources of African ecclesiastical discipline; (b) the Canons of the Council of Carthage (419), at which were present 217 bishops and among whose decrees were inserted 105 canons of previous councils.

==== Statuta Ecclesiæ Antiqua ====
In the second part of the Hispana (see below) and in other collections are found, together with other African councils, 104 canons which the compiler of the Hispana attributes to a Pseudo-Fourth Council of Carthage of 398. These canons are often known as Statuta Ecclesiæ Antiqua, and in some manuscripts are entitled Statuta antiqua Orientis.

Hefele maintains that in spite of their erroneous attribution, these canons are authentic, or at least summaries of authentic canons of ancient African councils, and collected in their present shape before the end of the sixth century. On the other hand, Maassen, Louis Duchesne, and Arthur Malnory believe them a compilation made at Arles in the first part of the sixth century; Malnory specifies Caesarius of Arles as their author.

==== The "Breviatio Canonum" ====
Compiled c. 546 by Fulgentius Ferrandus, it is a methodical collection and under its seven titles disposes 230 abridged canons of Greek ("Hispana" text) and African councils. Fulgentius was a deacon of Carthage and disciple of St. Fulgentius of Ruspe. (Note: The text is in Patrologia Latina LXVII.)

==== The "Concordia" of Cresconius ====
Cresconius Africanus, apparently a bishop, compiled his collection about 690. It is based on that of Dionysius Exiguus; only, in place of reproducing in full each canon, it cuts it up to suit the demands of the titles used; hence its name of "Concordia". Between the preface and the text of the collection the writer inserted a resume of his work. (Note: This took on the name of "Breviatio Canonum" which led some to imagine that the latter title implied a work other than the "Concordia", whereas it meant only a part or rather the preamble of the latter, whose text is in Patrologia Latina LXXXVIII.)

==== Egyptian Church Ordinance ====
The Egyptian Church Ordinance is an early Christian collection of canons regulating the main features of church life.

=== Collections of the Spanish Church ===
These comprise the collections that arose in the lands once under Visigothic rule — Spain, Portugal, and Southern Gaul. In this territory councils were very frequent, especially after the conversion of King Reccared (587), and they paid much attention to ecclesiastical discipline.

Such collections contain, besides the decrees of Spanish synods, the canons also of Nicæa and Sardica (accepted in the Spanish Church from the beginning), those of the Greek councils known through the "Itala", and those of the Gallican and African Councils, quite influential in the formation of Spanish ecclesiastical discipline. Three of these collections are important.

==== The "Capitula Martini" ====
It is divided into two parts, one dealing with the bishop and his clergy, the other relative to the laity; in both the author classifies methodically the canons of the councils in eighty-four chapters. He says himself in the preface that he does not pretend to reproduce the text literally, but with set purpose breaks up, abridges, or glosses the same, in order to make it more intelligible to "simple people"; possibly he has occasionally modified it to suit the Spanish discipline of his time. Though much has been borrowed from Latin, Gallican and African Councils, the Greek Councils furnish the greater part of the canons. The "Capitula" were read and approved at the Second Council of Braga in 572. Some writers, misled by the name, attributed them to Pope Martin I; they are in reality the work of Martin of Pannonia, better known as Martin of Braga, of which place he was archbishop in the sixth century. Their text was incorporated with the "Isidoriana", from which they were taken and edited apart by Merlin and by Gaspar Loaisa, and in the first volume of the oft-quoted work by Voel and Justel, after collation of the variants in the best manuscripts.

==== The Spanish "Epitome" ====
This is the name of the collection edited by the Ballerini from two manuscripts (Verona and Lucca). It has two parts: one includes the canons of Greek, African, Gallican and Spanish councils; the other divers papal decretals from Siricius to Pope Vigilius (384–555), with two apocryphal texts of St. Clement and an extract from St. Jerome. The compiler designedly abridged his texts, and mentions only three sources, a Braga collection (the "Capitula Martini", his first chapter being a resume of that work), an Alcalá (Complutum) collection, and one of Cabra (Agrabensis). Though characterized by lack of order and exactness, the "Epitome" is of interest due to the antiquity of its sources. Maassen thinks it connected with the "Codex Canonum", the nucleus of the group of collections whence eventually issued the "Hispana".

==== The "Hispana" or "Isidoriana" ====
This must not be confused with the above-described "Versio Hispanica" or "Isidoriana", among the earlier Latin collections, and which contained only canons of Greek councils.

The collection in question, like that of Dionysius Exiguus on which it is based, contains two parts: the first includes canons of Greek, African, Gallican and Spanish councils, with some letters of St. Cyril of Alexandria and Atticus of Constantinople, while the second has the papal decretals as found in Dionysius, together with some others, most of the latter addressed to Spanish bishops. This is the chronological "Hispana". Somewhat later, towards the end of the seventh century, it was recast in logical order, by some unknown writer, and divided into ten books, which were again subdivided into titles and chapters. This is the methodical "Hispana". Finally, the copyists were wont to place at the beginning of the chronological "Hispana" a table of contents of the methodical collection, but with references to the text of the chronological: in this shape it was known as the "Excerpta Canonum". The chronological "Hispana" seems to have been originally the "Codex Canonum" mentioned at the Fourth Council of Toledo (633), with later additions. In the ninth century it was attributed, with insufficient evidence, to St. Isidore of Seville.

In spite of this erroneous attribution, the "Hispana" contains very few documents of doubtful authenticity. Later on, additions were made to it, the latest being taken from the seventeenth council of Toledo (694). In this enlarged form, i. e. the "Codex Canonum", the "Hispana" was approved by Pope Alexander III as authentic.

Until the thirteenth century, its authority was great in Spain. Pseudo-Isidore made a generous use of its materials. (Note: See the text in Patrologia Latina, LXXXXIV, reprinted from the edition of Madrid, 1808–21, executed at the Royal Printing House.)

=== Gallican collections ===
==== Codex Carolinus ====
The "Codex Carolinus" is a collection of papal decretals addressed to the Frankish rulers Charles Martel, Pippin the Younger and Charlemagne, compiled by the latter's order in 791 (Patrologia Latina XCVIII), not to be confounded with the "Libri Carolini" in which were set forth for Pope Adrian I various points concerning the veneration of images.

=== English and Celtic collections ===
Michael Elliot has characterized the history of canon law collections in Anglo-Saxon England as follows:

[B]oth the dissemination of canon law collections within the Anglo-Saxon church and the study of canon law collections by Anglo-Saxon clergy were considerable indeed; even if they were not as popular as in some Continental churches, canon law collections served the Anglo-Saxon church as indispensable disciplinary, educational and administrative tools. Beginning in the seventh and eighth centuries, and fuelled by the early Anglo-Saxon church’s strong ties to Roman models, one sees in England the considerable influence of Italian canon law collections, most notably the collectiones Dionysiana, Sanblasiana and Quesnelliana. It was particularly at York and especially at Canterbury under the guidance of Archbishop Theodore that instruction in and study of these collections appears to have been carried out with the most fervour. In the eighth century, imbued with the legal teachings of these collections, reform-minded Anglo-Saxon personnel descended on the Low Countries and the lands east of the Rhine, bringing with them the institutional framework and disciplinary models they had inherited from their Roman and Celtic mentors. These included the collections already mentioned and also copies of the Collectio Hibernensis and several different types of penitential handbooks. It was also during this time that an important redaction of the Collectio vetus Gallica was disseminated on the Continent, due in part to the activities of Anglo-Saxon personnel. This acme of Anglo-Saxon canonical scholarship―exemplified from the seventh to late eighth century by such figures as Wilfrid, Ecgberht, Boniface, and Alcuin―seems to have ended sometime in the ninth century, probably as a result of the devastation of the Viking raids, which inflicted heavy losses upon England’s material and intellectual culture. In England, interest in and the manuscript resources necessary to carry out the study of Continental canonical sources would never again under the Anglo-Saxons reach the level they had attained in the first two hundred years of the English church's existence. Following the eighth century, the Anglo-Saxon church seems to have developed an increasingly strong tradition of operating juridically within the pre-existing secular legal framework. In this tradition―which lasted from at least the end of the ninth century until the Conquest and beyond―the legal and disciplinary spirit of the English church stood close to and drew support from the emerging strength of West Saxon kingship. Consequently, for the duration of the Anglo-Saxon period Continental canon law collections played a correspondingly smaller role in influencing the law and discipline of the church and its members. But they never became obsolete, and indeed an upsurge of interest in these collections can be seen taking place in the tenth and early eleventh centuries. New genres of canonical literature had been gaining in popularity on the Continent since the early ninth century. Most important among these, as far as Anglo-Saxon history is concerned, were the large penitential and canonico-penitential collections of the Carolingian period. A number of these collections crossed the Channel into England during the tenth century and were well received by the Anglo-Saxon episcopacy. By the beginning of the eleventh century, especially with the activities of Abbot Ælfric and Archbishop Wulfstan, study of canon law collections had once again attained a degree of sophistication in England. Nevertheless, despite England’s increasingly tight connections to the ecclesiastical traditions of the Continent―where the study of canon law thrived in the eleventh century―there are few signs that Ælfric’s and Wulfstan’s achievements in canonical scholarship were continued by their Anglo-Saxon successors in any significant way. Following the Conquest England saw the introduction of Norman libraries and personnel into England, a development that marks a very real terminus to the history of the Anglo-Saxon canonical tradition. The new ecclesiastical reforms and drastically different canonical preoccupations of Archbishop Lanfranc put the study of canon law in England upon entirely new foundations. With the accumulation of new texts and collections, and with the development of new scientific principles for their interpretation, ground was laid for Anglo-Norman England’s contribution to the monumental canonical reforms of the twelfth century―reforms in which the by now long outmoded Anglo-Saxon canonical tradition played (almost) no part.

The most celebrated of the Celtic canonical productions is the Collectio Hibernensis, of the early part of the eighth century, whose compiler put together previous ecclesiastical legislation in sixty-four to sixty-nine chapters, preceded by extracts from the "Etymologiæ" of St. Isidore of Seville concerning synodal regulations. The preface states that for the sake of brevity and clearness and to reconcile certain juridical antinomies, effort is made to render the sense of the canons rather than their letter. It is a methodical collection to the extent that the matters treated are placed in their respective chapters, but there is much confusion in the distribution of the latter. In spite of its defects, this collection made its way into France and Italy and until the twelfth century influenced the ecclesiastical legislation of churches in both countries (Paul Fournier, De l'influence de la collection irlandaise sur les collections canoniques).

=== Particular collections ===
Apart from the above-described general collections there are some special or particular collections that deserve brief mention:

1. Some of them deal with a particular heresy or schism, e. g. the collections of Tours, Verona, Salzburg and Monte Cassino, those of Notre Dame, of Rustiens, the Novaro-Vaticana and the "Codex Encyclius" relative to Eutyches and the Council of Chalcedon, the "Veronensis" and the "Virdunensis" in the affair of Acacius.
2. Others contain the documents and juridical texts that concern an individual church or country, e. g. the collection of Arles, in which were gathered the privileges of that Church, the collections of Lyon, Beauvais, Saint-Amand, Fécamp etc., in which were brought together the canons of the councils of France.
3. In the same category may be placed the capitula or episcopal statutes, i. e. decisions and regulations collected from Various quarters by local bishops for the use and direction of their clergy (see Capitularies), e. g. the "Capitula" of Theodulf of Orléans, end of the eighth century (Patrologia Latina CV), of Hatto of Basle (882, in Mon. Germ. Hist.: Leges, 1, 439–41) and of Boniface of Mainz (745, in D'Achéry, Spicilegium, ed. nova I, 597).
4. Still other collections deal with some special point of discipline. Such are the ancient liturgical collections called by the Greeks "Euchologia" and by the Latins "Libri mysteriorum" or "- sacramentorum", more usually "Sacramentaries", also since the eighth century the Ordines Romani. Here also belong the collections of ecclesiastical formulæ (see Books of Formularies), especially the Liber Diurnus of the Roman Chancery, compiled probably between 685 and 782 (Patrologia Latina CV, 11), edited by Garnier (Paris, 1680) and anew by M. de Rozières (Paris, 1869) and by Th. Sickel (Vienna, 1889). Special mention is due to the Penitential Books (Libri Pœnitentiales), collections of penitential canons, councils and catalogues of ecclesiastical sanctions, to which were gradually added rules for the administration of the Sacrament of Penance.

=== Collections of ecclesiastico-civil laws ===
Early canon law often adopted provisions from local secular laws. Some secular authorities also passed legislation on religious issues, either with church cooperation (as with the Carolingian kings) or without it (as with the Byzantine emperors). Moreover, priests were occasionally asked to decide on purely secular matters.

Therefore, books of civil laws relevant to ecclesiastical topics (known as nomocanones in the East) were often published. These included:

1. Collections of Roman Law. This law interested quite particularly the ecclesiastics of the barbarian kingdoms that rose on the ruins of the Western Empire, since they continued to live by it (Ecclesia vivit lege romana); moreover, apart from the laws of the Anglo-Saxons, the legislation of all the barbarian peoples of Gaul, Spain, and Italy was profoundly Influenced by the Roman law. (a) The "Lex romana canonice compta", apparently compiled in Lombardy during the ninth century, and handed down in a manuscript of the Bibliothèque Nationale at Paris. It includes portions of the "Institutiones" of the "Codex" of Justinian and of the "Epitome" of Julian.
2. Capitularies of the Frankish Kings. The laws of the latter were very favourable to religious interests; not a few of them were the result of the mutual deliberations of both the civil and the ecclesiastical power. Hence the exceptional authority of the royal capitularies before ecclesiastical tribunals. In the first half of the ninth century Ansegisus, Abbot of Fontenelles (823–33), collected in four books capitularies of Charlemagne, Louis the Pious and Lothaire I; the first two books contain provisions concerning the "ecclesiastical order", the latter two exhibit the "law of the world". Ansegisus himself added three appendixes. His work was widely used in France, Germany and Italy, and was quoted in diets and councils as an authentic collection.

=== Overview ===
This rapid sketch exhibits the vitality of the Church from the earliest centuries, and her constant activity for the preservation of ecclesiastical discipline. During this long elaboration the Greek Church unifies her legislation, but accepts little from beyond her own boundaries. On the other hand, the Western Church, with perhaps the sole exception of Africa, makes progress in the development of local discipline and exhibits an anxiety to harmonize particular legislation with the decretals of the popes, the canons of general councils, and the special legislation of the rest of the Church. Doubtless in the above-described collection of canons, the result of this long disciplinary development, some forged decrees and collections must appear. Nevertheless, the influence of these apocryphal works on other canonical collections was restricted. The latter were, almost universally, made up of authentic documents. Canonical science in the future would have been nourished exclusively from legitimate sources had not a larger number of forged documents appeared about the middle of the ninth century (Capitula of Benedict Levita, Capitula Angilramni, Canons of Isaac of Langres, above all the collection of Pseudo-Isidore. See False Decretals). But ecclesiastical vigilance did not cease; in the West especially, the Church kept up an energetic protest against the decay of her discipline; witness the many councils, diocesan synods and mixed assemblies of bishops and civil officials, also the numerous (over forty) new canonical collections from the ninth to the beginning of the twelfth century and whose methodical order foreshadows the great juridical syntheses of later centuries. Being compiled, however, for the most part not directly from the original canonical sources, but from immediately preceding collections, which in turn often depend on apocryphal productions of the ninth century, they appear tainted to the extent in which they make use of these forgeries. Such taint, however, affects the critical value of these collections rather than the legitimacy of the legislation which they exhibit. While the "False Decretals" affected certainly ecclesiastical discipline, it is now generally recognized that they did not introduce any essential or constitutional modifications. They gave a more explicit formulation to certain principles of the constitution of the Church, or brought more frequently into practice certain rules hitherto less recognized in daily use.

The German collections, while not failing to admit the rights of the papal primacy, are seemingly concerned with the adaptation of the canons to actual needs of time and place; this is particularly visible in the collection of Burchard of Worms. The Italian collections, on the other hand, insist more on the rights of the papal primacy, and in general of the spiritual power. M. Fournier indicates, as especially influential in this sense, the Collection in Seventy-four Titles. Both tendencies meet and unite in the works of Yvo of Chartres. The compilations of this epoch may, therefore, be classed in these two broad categories.

== End of the ninth century to Gratian (1139–1150) ==
In these two centuries the ecclesiastical authorities were quite active in their efforts to withstand the decay of Christian discipline; the evidence of this is seen in the frequency of councils, mixed assemblies of bishops and imperial officials and diocesan synods whose decrees (capitularies) were often published by the bishops. In this period many new collections of canons were made.

=== Collectio Anselmo Dedicata ===
Its twelve books treat hierarchy, judgments, ecclesiastical persons, spiritual things (rules of faith, precepts, sacraments, liturgies) and persons separated from the Church. Its sources are the "Dionysiana", the "Hispana", the correspondence (Registrum) of Gregory I and various collections of civil laws. Unfortunately it has also drawn on Pseudo-Isidore.

The work is dedicated to an Anselm, whom the 1913 Catholic Encyclopedia identifies with Anselm II of Milan. It is held to have been compiled in Italy towards the end of the ninth century. It is certainly anterior to Burchard of Worms (1012–1023), whose work depends on this collection. The author is unknown.

=== Collection of Regino of Prüm ===
Regino of Prüm's work is entitled "De ecclesiasticis disciplinis et religione Christianâ" (on the discipline of the Church and the Christian religion). According to the preface it was put together by order of Ratbod, metropolitan of Trier, as a manual for episcopal use in the course of diocesan visitations.

Its two books treat of the clergy and ecclesiastical property viz. of the laity. Each book begins with a list (elenchus) of questions that indicate the points of chief importance in the eyes of the bishop. After this catechism, it adds the canons and ecclesiastical authorities relative to each question.

The collection was made about 906 and seems to depend on an earlier one edited by Richter entitled "Antiqua Canonum collectio qua in libris de synodalibus causis compilandis usus est Regino Prumiensis" (Marburg, 1844). (Note: The text of Regino is found in Patrologia Latina CXXXII; a more critical edition is that of Wasserschleben, "Reginonis Abbatis Prum. libri duo de synodalibus causis" (Leipzig, 1840).)

=== The "Capitula Abbonis" ===
Abbo, Abbot of Fleury (died 1004), dedicated to Hugues Capet and his son Robert Capet a collection in fifty-six chapters.

It deals with the clergy, ecclesiastical property, monks and their relations with the bishops. Besides the canons and papal decretals, Abbo made use of the Capitularies, the Roman civil law, and the laws of the Visigoths; his collection is peculiar in that he enclosed within his own context the texts quoted by him. (Note: This collection is found in the second volume of the "Vetera Analecta" of Mabillon (Paris, 1675–85), and is reprinted in Patrologia Latina CXXXI.)

=== The "Collectarium Canonum" or "Libri decretorum" of Burchard of Worms ===
This collection in twenty books, often called Brocardus, was compiled by Burchard, an ecclesiastic of Mainz, later Bishop of Worms (1002–1025), at the suggestion of Brunicho, provost of Worms, and with the aid of Walter, Bishop of Speyer, and the monk Albert. Burchard follows quite closely the following order: hierarchy, liturgy, sacraments, delicts, sanctions and criminal procedure. The nineteenth book was familiarly known as Medicus or Corrector, because it dealt with the spiritual ailments of different classes of the faithful; it has been edited by Wasserschleben in Bussordnungen der abendländischen Kirche (Leipzig, 1851). The twentieth, which treats of Providence, predestination and the end of the world, is therefore a theological treatise.

The collection, composed between 1013 and 1023 (perhaps in 1021 or 1022), is not a mere compilation, but a revision of the ecclesiastical law from the standpoint of actual needs, and an attempt to reconcile various juridical antinomies or contradictions. Burchard is a predecessor of Gratian and, like the latter, was a very popular canonist in his time. He depends on the above-mentioned ninth-century collections and even added to their apocryphal documents and erroneous attributions. The two collections just described (Regino and Collectio Anselmo dedicata) were known and largely used by him. Pseudo-Isidore also furnished him more than 200 pieces. The entire collection is in Patrologia Latina, CXL.

=== The "Collectio Duodecim Partium" ===
Yet unedited, is by an unknown, probably German, author. It includes a great deal of Burchard, follows quite closely his order, and by most is held to have copied his material, though some believe it older than Burchard.

=== The Collection in Seventy-four Books ===
The Collection in Seventy-four Books, or "Diversorum sententia Patrum", known to the Ballerini brothers and Augustin Theiner, is the subject of a study by Paul Fournier. He considers it a compilation of the middle of the eleventh century, done about the reign of St. Leo IX (1048–54), and in the entourage of that pope and Hildebrand.

It was well known in and out of Italy and furnished to other collections not only their general order, but also much of their material. Fournier believes it the source of the collection of Anselm of Lucca, of the Tarraconensis and the Polycarpus, also of other collections specified by him.

=== Collection of Anselm of Lucca ===
This collection is divided into thirteen books. It is based on Burchard and the "Collectio Anselmo dedicata" and contains many apocryphal pieces and papal decretals not found in other collections. (Note: The Ballerini concluded that St. Anselm consulted directly the pontifical archives.)

It has no preface; from the beginning (Incipit) of a Vatican manuscript it is clear that Anselm of Lucca compiled the work during the pontificate and by order of Pope Gregory VII (died 1085). It passed almost entire into the Decretum of Gratian. (Note: A critical edition is owing to Friedrich Thaner, who published the first four books under the title "Anselmi episcopi Lucensis collectio canonum una cum collectione minore Jussu Instituti Saviniani (Savigny) recensuit F. T." (Innsbruck, 1906).)

=== Collection of Cardinal Deusdedit ===
Cardinal Deusdedit was enabled to use the correspondence (Registrum) of Pope Gregory VII, also the Roman archives.

His work is dedicated to Pope Victor III (1086–87), the successor of Gregory, and dates therefore from the reign of Victor; its four books on the papal primacy, the Roman clergy, ecclesiastical property and the Patrimony of Peter, reflect the contemporary anxieties of the papal entourage during this phase of the conflict of Investiture between the Church and the Holy Roman Empire. (Note: Pio Martinucci (Venice, 1869) produced a very imperfect edition of this collection; Wolf de Granvell, professor at Gratz, produced a critical edition (Die Kanonessammlung des Kardinals Deusdedit, Paderborn, 1906).)

=== Collection of Bonizo ===
Bonizo, Bishop of Sutri near Piacenza, published, apparently a little later than 1089, a collection in ten books preceded by a brief preface which treats successively the catechism and baptism, then the duties of divers classes of the faithful: ecclesiastical rulers and inferior clergy, temporal authorities and their subjects, finally of the cure of souls and the penitential canons. The fourth book only (De excellentiâ Ecclesiæ Romanæ) has found an editor, Cardinal Mai, in the seventh volume of his "Nova Bibliotheca Patrum" (Rome, 1854).

=== The "Polycarpus" ===
A collection in eight books so called by its author, Gregory, Cardinal of San Crisogono (q.v.), and dedicated to Diego Gelmírez, Archbishop of Compostella, of whose name only the initial "D." is given; also known as Didacus, he was archbishop of that see from 1101 to 1120, which is therefore the approximate date of the "Polycarpus" (now given as around 1113). It depends on Anselm of Lucca and on the "Collectio Anselmo dedicata", and the above-mentioned "Collection in Seventy-four Books"; the author, however, must have had access to the Roman archives.

=== Collection of Yvo of Chartres ===
Yvo of Chartres exercised a pronounced influence on the development of canon law (he died 1115 or 1117). Paul Fournier assembled a study of his juridical activity.

He has left us:

1. The "Decretum", a vast repertory in seventeen parts and three thousand seven hundred and sixty chapters; though roughly subdivided under the aforesaid seventeen rubrics, its contents are thrown together without order and seemingly represent undigested results of the author's studies and researches; hence it has been surmised that the "Decretum" is a mere preparatory outline of the "Panormia" (see below), its material in the rough. Theiner does not admit that the "Decretum" is the work of Yvo; it is, nevertheless, generally accepted that Yvo is the author, or at least that he directed the compilation. Nearly all of Burchard is found therein, and in addition a host of canonical texts, also Roman and Frankish law texts gathered from Italian sources. Fournier dates it between 1090 and 1095. It is found in Patrologia Latina CLXI.
2. The "Panormia", admittedly a work of Yvo. It is much shorter than the "Decretum" (having only eight books) and is also more compact and orderly. Its material is taken from the Decretum, but it offers some additions, particularly in the third and fourth books. It seems to have been composed about 1095, and appears at that time as a kind of methodical Summa of the canon law; with Burchard it divided popularity in the next fifty years, i. e. until the appearance of the "Decretum" of Gratian.
3. The "Tripartita", so called because of its triple division, contains in its first part papal decretals as late as Urban II (died 1099), and is therefore not of later date; its second part offers canons of the councils after the "Hispana" text; the third part contains extracts from the Fathers and from the Roman - and the Frankish law. (Note: Hitherto it was supposed to have been taken from the "Decretum" of Yvo or composed by some unknown author. Fournier, however, thinks that only the third book postdates the "Decretum", and then as an abridgment (A). The other two books he considers a trial-essay of the "Decretum", by Yvo himself or by some writer who worked under his direction while he laboured at the vast bulk of the "Decretum". These two books, according to Fournier, formed a separate collection (A) later on joined to the above-mentioned third book (B), in which manner arose the actual "Tripartita". In this hypothesis many chapters in the "Decretum" were borrowed from the aforementioned (A) collection, whose nucleus is found in its extracts from Pseudo-Isidore completed from divers other sources, especially by use of a collection of Italian origin, now kept in the British Museum. hence known as the "Britannica". The "Tripartita" is yet unedited.)

=== Diverse collections ===
All three of these above-described collections (Decretum, Panormia, Tripartita) called for and found abridgements. Moreover, new collections arose, owing to fresh additions to these major compilations and new combinations with other similar works. Among them are:

1. The "Cæsaraugustana", so called because found in a Spanish Carthusian monastery near Zaragoza. It seems to have been compiled in Aquitaine and contains no papal decretals later than Paschal II (died 1118), which suggests its composition at a previous date. Its fifteen books borrow much from the "Decretum" of Yvo of Chartres.
2. The "Collection in Ten Parts", compiled in France between 1125 and 1130, an enlarged edition of the "Panormia".
3. The "Summa-Decretorum" of Haymo, Bishop of Châlons-sur-Marne (1153), an abridgment of the preceding.
4. Antonius Augustinus, who made known in the sixteenth century the "Cæsaraugustana", revealed also the existence of the "Tarraconensis", which came to him from the Spanish Cistercian monastery of Ploblete, near Tarragona in six books. It has no documents later than the reign of Gregory VII (died 1085) and belongs therefore to the end of the eleventh century; the "Correctores Romani", which includes the official edition of the "Corpus Juris canonici", made use of the "Tarraconensis". (Note: Fournier called attention to two manuscripts of this collection, one in the Vatican, the other in the Bibliothèque Nationale at Paris (see above, the Collection in Seventy-four Books).)

== See also ==
- Collectiones canonum Dionysianae
- Collectio canonum Quesnelliana
- Collectio canonum quadripartita
- Collectio canonum Wigorniensis
- Collectio canonum Hibernensis
- Penitential
- Libellus responsionum
