= Collectio canonum Quesnelliana =

Late antique canonical collection

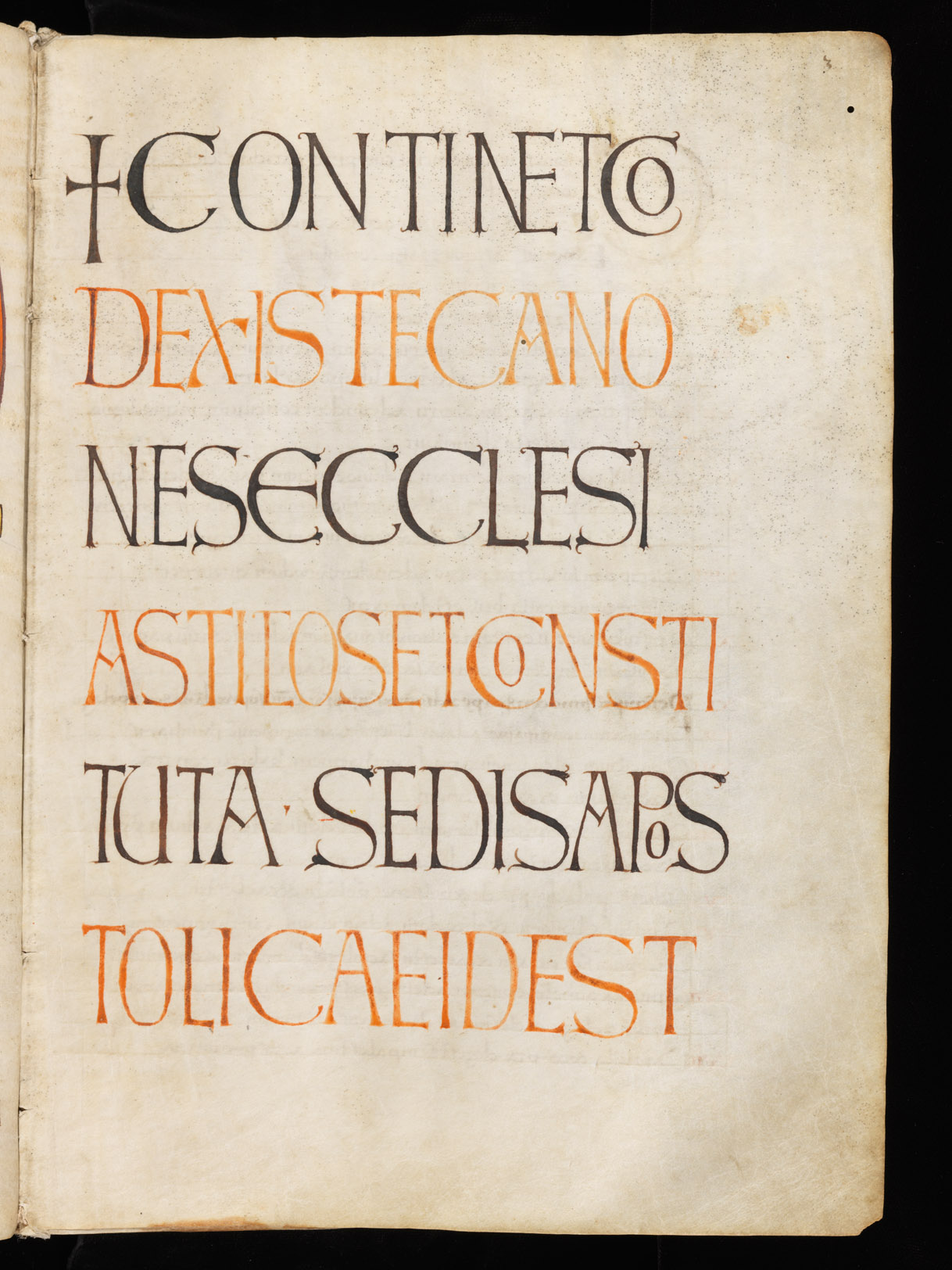
- Folio 3r from Einsiedeln, Stiftsbibliothek, Codex 191 (277), showing a decorative title page for the Quesnelliana
- Audience: Catholic clergy
- Language: early medieval Latin
- Date: ca. 500
- Genre: canon law collection
- Subject: Christology; heresy; Catholic doctrine; ecclesiastical and lay discipline

The Collectio canonum Quesnelliana is a vast collection of canonical and doctrinal documents (divided into ninety-eight chapters) prepared (probably) in Rome sometime between 494 and (probably) 610. It was first identified by Pierre Pithou and first edited by Pasquier Quesnel in 1675, whence it takes its modern name. The standard edition used today is that prepared by Girolamo and Pietro Ballerini in 1757.

== Purpose, origin and organization ==
The collection can be divided broadly into three sections according to the nature of its contents: cc. I–V, containing conciliar canons from the major fourth-century eastern and African councils; cc. VI–LVII, being a long series of documents (mostly letters) pertaining to doctrinal disputes that arose from the teachings of Pelagius and Celestius and also of Nestorius and Eutyches―at the centre of which series is a dossier (c. XXV) of material pertaining to the council of Chalcedon in 451—and cc. LVIII–XCVIII, a collection of dogmatic and disciplinary letters written by Pope Leo I, many of which (most notably Leo's Tomus) were directed to eastern figures in Leo's contests with the Eutychian and Monophysite heresies.

The entire collection, with its focus on Chalcedon and the letters of Leo, is quite obviously meant as a manifesto against the Acacian schism, in which eastern Bishops led by Acacius, patriarch of Constantinople, challenged the decisions of the council of Chalcedon and the Christology set down in Pope Leo's Tomus. The compiler's principal of selection thus seems to have been any and all documents that support doctrinal unity in general and Leonine Christology in particular. The compiler of the Quesnelliana has avoided inclusion of doubtful or spurious documents, like the so-called Symmachean forgeries and the Decretum Gelasianum de libris recipiendis. But this would seem to be the extent of discrimination exercised in the compilation of the Quesnelliana. Previous scholars have in fact spoken rather disparagingly of the overall organization of the Quesnelliana, characterizing it as something of a hotchpotch, a patchwork of several older and smaller collections that were available to the compiler. Despite its organizational flaws, however, the Quesnelliana enjoyed some popularity in the Gallic church during the eighth century, and much of the ninth as well, until it was superseded by the more comprehensive historical collections (notably the Collectio canonum Dionysio-Hadriana and pseudo-Isidorian collections) that arose in the later Carolingian period.

Of the large chronological canon collections to have come out of the early Middle Ages, the Quesnelliana is perhaps the earliest and, after the Collectio canonum Dionysiana and Collectio canonum Hispana, probably the most influential. It contains Latin translations of the eastern councils that are (with the exception of the council of Chalcedon) taken from a now lost collection of Latin canons made ca. 420. This earliest Latin collection of fourth- and fifth-century conciliar canons was previously known to scholars as either the versio Isidori or the Collectio Maasseniana, but is today referred to as the Corpus canonum Africano-Romanum. The Africano-Romanum collection/translation predates the competing fifth-century Latin translation that Dionysius Exiguus referred to as the prisca (upon which the Collectio canonum Sanblasiana is based). Both the Africano-Romanum and prisca translations were largely superseded by the arrival, shortly after 500, of the superior translations of the several collections of Dionysius Exiguus.

The exact date of the Quesnelliana’s creation is not yet established, but it could not have been earlier than the appearance of the Africano-Romanum in the first half of the fifth century; nor could it have been earlier than the date of the Quesnelliana’s most recent document, Pope Gelasius I’s Generale decretum (not to be confused with the spurious Decretum Gelasianum), which dates to 494. Most historians have accepted the Ballerini brothers’ dating of the Quesnelliana to just before the end of the fifth century, probably during the pontificate of Pope Gelasius I (492–496).

Older scholarship, beginning with the Ballerinis, argued that the Quesnelliana was a Gallic collection, though one with an admittedly "Roman colour". French historians then developed the theory that the collection originated at Arles, which was thought to have been something of a clearing house for canonical materials in the early sixth century. However, more recent scholarship, making much more of the Quesnelliana’s "Roman colour", has argued for an Italian, possibly even Roman origin. Relatively recent work (in 1985) by Joseph Van der Speeten has shown that the Quesnelliana, or at least one of its constituent parts (namely the dossier de Nicée et de Sardique), may have been used as a source for Dionysius's collections. If true, this places the Quesnelliana definitively at Rome during the first decade of the sixth century.

== Importance and dissemination ==
The Quesnelliana has been especially valued by historians for its large complement of correspondence by Pope Leo I. While the exact nature of the compiler's source material for the Leonine letters is still a subject of debate, it seems that at least some of it depended upon a very old tradition. Detlev Jasper remarks that

The compiler of the Quesnelliana seems to have been especially interested in Pope Leo’s writings. He gathered the letters that were available and put them at the end of his collection as numbers LXVII to XCVIIII, although without any recognizable order or organization. [...] The compiler’s main goal seems to have been to maximize the number of Leonine letters in the collection and consequently he placed less stress on order or on the literary shape of his material.

Leo's letters represent one of the most important historical sources for the doctrinal controversies that troubled the mid fifth-century church, especially the Eutychian controversy, which centred on a Christological debate that eventually led to the separation of the eastern and western churches. Because its collection of Leonine letters is more extensive than almost any other early medieval collection, the Quesnelliana stands as something of a textbook on this particularly important doctrinal dispute. Moreover, it also contains a significant complement of documents pertaining to the heresies of Pelagius, Celestius and Acacius (Quesnelliana cc. VI–LVII), making it an unusual canonical collection in that it focuses about as much on doctrinal issues as on disciplinary ones.

Insofar as the Quesnelliana is a textbook on the controversies that beset the early Latin church, one might expect that it would not have been of much use to bishops after the seventh century, when the last vestiges of Eutychianism and Monophysitism were suppressed in West. Nevertheless, the Quesnelliana remained a popular work well into the ninth century, particularly in Francia. Most likely this was because of the numerous papal letters it contained that dealt with disciplinary matters that retained ecclesiastical importance throughout the Middle Ages. The Quesnelliana played a particularly important role in the spread of Leo's letters in Western canonistic literature, and was notably instrumental in the compilations of pseudo-Isidore for just this reason. Manuscript evidence alone indicates that the Quesnelliana had a fairly wide dissemination in Gaul during the eighth and ninth centuries; though it had perhaps already found a welcome audience with Gallic or Frankish bishops in the sixth century, when it may have been used as a source (along with the Sanblasiana) for the Collectio canonum Colbertina and the Collectio canonum Sancti Mauri. By the mid-eighth century, the Quesnelliana had secured its place as an important lawbook within the Frankish episcopate, for whom it served as the primary source-book during the influential council of Verneuil in 755, over which Pepin the Short presided. Thus, despite its probably being generally perceived as an archaic document that had much to say about doctrinal controversies that were no longer relevant, the Quesnelliana continued to exert considerable influence on canonical activities in Francia throughout the eighth and ninth centuries.
