= Gregory of San Grisogono =

Gregory of St. Grisogono (Gregory, cardinal presbyter of San Crisogono, Gregorius de sancto Grisogono, Gregorio di San Crisogono) (died 30 November 1113 in Lucca) was a cardinal and author on canon law. He is known for his work Polycarpus, i.e.. Canonum collectio "Polycarpus".

According to R. A. Fletcher

Up-to-date the Polycarpus certainly was. Gregory drew heavily upon the compilation of Anselm of Lucca and the Collection in 74 Titles, the two most authoritative collections of the recent past, and he included pronouncements of Gregory VII, Urban II and Paschal II, and conciliar material from as late as Piacenza (1095). The scope of his book was comprehensive and its orderly arrangement made for ease of reference. While seven of the eight books into which the work was divided were generally conservative in tone — they owed much to the Decretum of Burchard of Worms — the first book, which was devoted to the primacy and special rights of the see of Rome, was strongly papalist.

The work was dedicated to Diego Gelmírez, whom Gregory had met as archdeacon of Lucca.
