= Collectio canonum Wigorniensis =

Medieval canon law collection

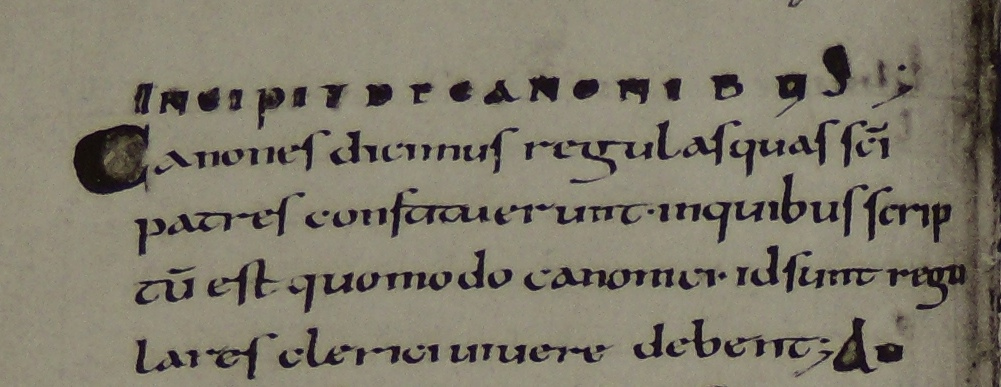
- Folio 127v from the London manuscript, showing the beginning of the B recension of the Wigorniensis
- Also known as: Wigorniensis, Excerptiones Ecgberhti, "Wulfstan's canon law collection"
- Language: medieval Latin
- Date: ca. 1005
- Manuscript(s): five
- First printed edition: "Excerptiones d. Egberti Eboracensis Archiepiscopi e dictis et canonibus sanctorum patrum concinnatæ, et ad ecclesiastciæ politiæ institutionem conducentes", in Concilia, decreta, leges, constitvtiones in re ecclesiarum orbis Britannici ... ab initio christianæ ibidem religionis, ad nostram usque ætatem ... Tom. I: ... a primis Christi seculis usque ad introitum Normannorum .., ed. H. Spelman, with J. Stephens and J. Spelman (London, 1639). Spelman's edition comprises four works, the first of which is the Wigorniensis
- Genre: canon and penitential law collection
- Subject: church law, administration and discipline; ecclesiastical and lay penance
- Sources: Collectio canonum quadripartita, Collectio canonum vetus Gallica, Collectio canonum Hibernensis, the letters of Ælfric of Eynsham, the Collectio capitularium of Ansegisus, the Iudicia Theodori, the Paenitentiale pseudo-Theodori, the Paenitentiale Ecgberhti, various other Frankish penitentials, the Scarapsus of Pirmin, several Carolingian capitula episcoporum, the De pressuris ecclesiasticis of Atto of Vercelli, the Aachen Rule, the enlarged Rule of Chrodegang, the Excerpta de libris Romanorum et Francorum, the Libellus responsionum of Gregory the Great, the Sententiae and Etymologiae of Isidore of Seville, the sermons of Abbo of Saint-Germain-des-Prés, etc.

The Collectio canonum Wigorniensis (also known as the Excerptiones Ecgberhti or as "Wulfstan's canon law collection") is a medieval canon law collection originating in southern England around the year 1005.

It exists in multiple recensions, the earliest of which — "Recension A" — consists of just over 100 canons drawn from a variety of sources, most predominantly the ninth-century Frankish collection of penitential and canon law known as the Collectio canonum quadripartita. The author of Recension A is currently unknown. Other recensions also exist, slightly later in date than the first. These later recensions are extensions and augmentations of Recension A, and are known collectively as "Recension B".

These later recensions all bear the unmistakable mark of having been created by Wulfstan, bishop of Worcester and archbishop of York, possibly sometime around the year 1008, though some of them may have been compiled as late as 1023, the year of Wulfstan's death. The collection treats a range of ecclesiastical and lay subjects, such as clerical discipline, church administration, lay and clerical penance, public and private penance, as well as a variety of spiritual, doctrinal and catechistic matters. Several "canons" in the collection verge on the character of sermons or expository texts rather than church canons in the traditional sense; but nearly every element in the collection is prescriptive in nature, and concerns the proper ordering of society in a Christian polity.

== Bibliography ==
- P. Wormald, The making of English law: King Alfred to the twelfth century. Vol. I: legislation and its limits (Oxford, 1999; repr. 2000).
- Wulfstan’s canon law collection, eds J.E. Cross and A. Hamer, Anglo-Saxon texts 1 (Cambridge, 1999).
- A Wulfstan manuscript, containing institutes, laws and homilies (British Museum Cotton Nero A.I), ed. H.R. Loyn, Early English manuscripts in facsimile 17 (Copenhagen, 1971).
