= Collectiones canonum Dionysianae =

Collections of canon law compiled by Dionysius Exiguus in the 6th century

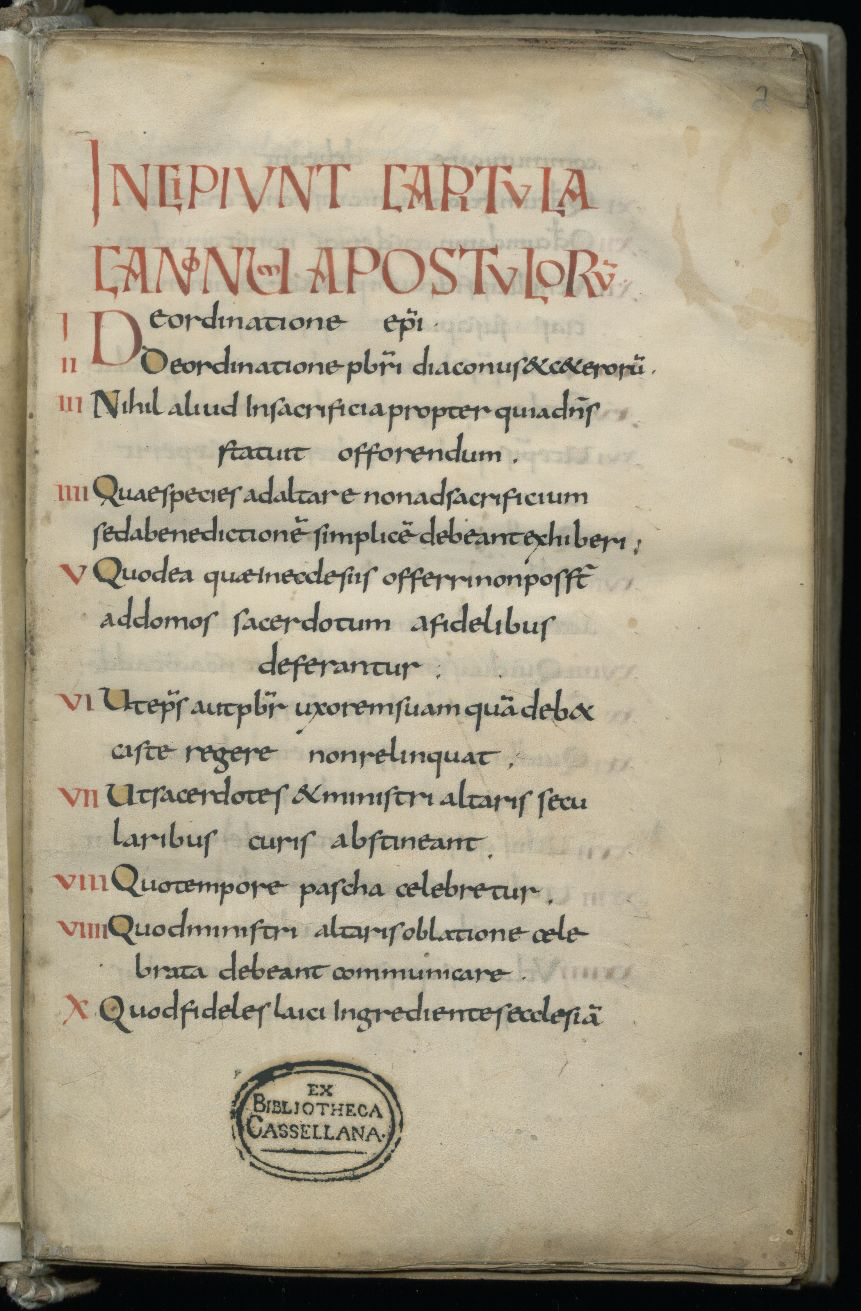
- Folio 2r from Kassel, Landesbibliothek und Murhardsche Bibliothek, MS 4° theol. 1, showing the beginning of the Collectio conciliorum Dionysiana I
- Date: ca. 500
- Genre: canon law collection

The Collectiones canonum Dionysianae (Latin for Dionysian collections of canons), also known as Collectio Dionysiana or Dionysiana Collectio ("Dionysian Collection"), are the several collections of ancient canons prepared by a Scythian monk, Dionysius 'the humble' (exiguus). They include the Collectio conciliorum Dionysiana I, the Collectio conciliorum Dionysiana II, and the Collectio decretalium Dionysiana. They are of the utmost importance for the development of the canon law tradition in the West.

Towards 500 a Scythian monk, known as Dionysius Exiguus, who had come to Rome after the death of Pope Gelasius (496), and who was well skilled in both Latin and Greek, undertook to bring out a more exact translation of the canons of the Greek church councils. In a second effort, he collected papal decretals from Siricius (384-89) to Anastasius II (496-98) included (, anterior therefore, to Pope Symmachus (498-514)). By order of Pope Hormisdas (514-23), Dionysius made a third collection, in which he included the original text of all the canons of the Greek councils, together with a Latin version of the same; but the preface alone has survived. Finally, he combined the first and second in one collection, which thus united the canons of the councils and the papal decretals; it is in this shape that the work of Dionysius has reached us.

This collection opens with a table or list of titles, each of which is afterwards repeated before the respective canons; then come the first fifty Canons of the Apostles, the canons of the Greek councils, the canons of Carthage (419), and the canons of preceding African synods under Aurelius, which had been read and inserted in the Council of Carthage. This first part of the collection is closed by a letter of Pope Boniface I, read at the same council, letters of Cyril of Alexandria and Atticus of Constantinople to the African bishops, and a letter of Pope Celestine I. The second part of the collection opens likewise with a preface, in the shape of a letter to the priest Julian, and a table of titles; then follow one decretal of Siricius, twenty-one of Innocent I, one of Zozimus, four of Boniface I, three of Celestine I, seven of pope Leo I, one of Gelasius I and one of Anastasius II. The additions met with in Voel and Justel are taken from inferior manuscripts. (Note: It was first printed in the first volume of Voel & Justel (1661), re-edited by Lepelletier (Paris, 1687), and reprinted in Patrologia Latina, LXVII. A more recent edition is that of Cuthbert Hamilton Turner, in Ecclesiæ Occidentalis Monumenta Juris Antiquissima (Oxford, 1899-1939), vol. II, fasc. II.)

== Conciliar collections ==
=== Collectio conciliorum Dionysiana I ===
Dionysius did his translation at the request of Stephen, bishop of Salona, and a certain 'dearest brother Laurence' (carissimus frater Laurentius) who (as we learn from Dionysius's preface to his collection) had been 'offended by the awkwardness of the older [priscae] translation'. It is not certain, but it may have been within the context of the Symmachan-Laurentian dispute that these requests were made of Dionysius. Eckhard Wirbelauer, reviving several older arguments, has recently argued that Dionysius's collection was meant to stand in direct opposition to the views of Pope Symmachus, and thus it was likely to have won neither the favour nor acceptance of that pope, nor possibly (at least at first) his immediate successor and strong supporter, Pope Hormisdas.

=== Collectio conciliorum Dionysiana II ===
Shortly after preparing his first collection of conciliar canons, Dionysius prepared a second recension of the same name, to which he made important changes. He updated his translations, altered rubrics, and, perhaps most importantly, introduced a system of numbering the canons in sequence (whereas the Dionysiana I had numbered the canons of each council separately). In the Dionysiana II the Canones apostolorum were still numbered separately from 1 to 50, but now the canons of Nicaea to Constantinople were numbered in sequence from I to CLXV, 'just' (Dionysius says) 'as is found in the Greek authority [auctoritate]', that is in Dionysius’s Greek exemplar. Dionysius also altered the position of Chalcedon, moving it from after the Codex Apiarii to before Sardica, and removed the versio Attici of the canons of Nicaea from Codex Apiarii (found there in the Dionysiana I appended to the rescript of Atticus of Constantinople). Finally, he added an important collection of African canons to his second recension. Known today as the Registri ecclesiae Carthaginensis excerpta, this is a 'large body of conciliar legislation from the earlier Aurelian councils'.

=== Collectio conciliorum Dionysiana III ===
The existence of a third bilingual (Greek-Latin) collection of conciliar canons, in which Dionysius removed the spurious Canones apostolorum along with the 'African' canons and the problematic canons of Sardica, can be deduced from a preface now extant in Novara, Biblioteca Capitolare, XXX (66) (written end of ninth century in northern Italy). Unfortunately, no copies of the text of this recension have survived. The fact that Pope Hormisdas, noted supporter of the previous pope Symmachus, commissioned this collection from Dionysius is significant for several of reasons. First, it indicates that Hormisdas was interested in commissioning something like an authoritative collection of Greek canons for use in the West. Second, it also poses a problem for the theory that Dionysius was a staunch supporter of Laurence's camp in the Symmachan-Laurentian conflict several years previous. Wirbelauer has attempted to explain, however, how an initially sour relationship between Dionysius and Hormisdas could have improved over time through Dionysius's eventual capitulation to the views of the victorious Symmachan faction.

== Decretal collection ==
Sometime after preparing his collections of conciliar canons (but still during the pontificate of Symmachus), Dionysius compiled a collection of papal decretals (Collectio decretalium Dionysiana) that he dedicated to one 'Priest Julian' (Iulianus presbyter). Whether Dionysius composed this collection at Julianus's request or on his own initiative is not known, as his preface is ambiguous on this point. The collection includes 38 decretals written by popes Siricius, Innocent I, Zosimus, Boniface I, Celestine I, Leo I, Gelasius, and Anastasius II. By far the greater number of decretals were from Innocent I; the reason for this is not certain, but it is possibly explained on the theory that Dionysius had access to a collection of Innocent’s letters that was not found in the papal archives and that had not been available to previous compilers of decretal collections.

== Collectiones combined ==
So far as can be known, Dionysius did not package his conciliar and decretal collections together, nor is there any evidence that he intended them to combined. In fact, given the many differences between the collections in terms of genre, themes, tone, style, chronological and geographical coverage, and possibly even jurisdiction — his decretal collection was, after all, 'less oecumenical in its conception than the collection of conciliar decrees'.

== Manuscripts ==
=== Collectio conciliorum Dionysiana I ===
Siglum	Manuscript	Contents
K	Kassel, Landesbibliothek und Murhardsche Bibliothek, MS 4° theol. 1 (written first third of ninth century in the Main River region, perhaps Fulda)	Collectio conciliorum Dionysiana I (without preface).
M	Vatican, Biblioteca Apostolica Vaticana, Pal. Lat. 577 (written end of the eighth century in the Main River region, perhaps Hersfeld, Fulda or Mainz)	Collectio conciliorum Dionysiana I (with shorter preface).

== See also ==
- Collections of ancient canons
- Collectio Dionysio-Hadriana
