= Victorius of Aquitaine =

5th century French cleric and author

Victorius of Aquitaine (fl. 457), a countryman of Prosper of Aquitaine and also working in Rome, produced in AD 457 an Easter Cycle, which was based on the consular list provided by Prosper's Chronicle. This dependency caused scholars to think that Prosper had been working on his own Easter Annals for quite some time. In fact, Victorius published his work only two years after the final publication of Prosper's Chronicle.

Victorius finished his Cursus Paschalis in 457. From that date onward, he left blank the column giving the names of the consuls, but his table continued until the year AD 559 or Anno Passionis 532 (in the year of the Passion [of Jesus] 532 — Victorius placed the Passion in AD 28), hence the name Cursus Paschalis annorum DXXXII (Easter Table up to the year 532). This first version was later continued by other authors, who filled in the names of the consuls as the years passed.

The Victorian system of the Cursus Paschalis was made official by a synod in Gaul in 541 and was still in use for historical work in England by 743, when an East Anglian king-list was created, which was double-dated with Victorian and Dionysian (A.D.) eras. Also, it was used for a letter to Charlemagne in 773, and probably, in its continued form, a source for both Bede (who found here that Aetius was consul for the third time in 446) and the Historia Brittonum.

Victorius also wrote a 98-column multiplication table which gave (in Roman numerals) the product of every number from 2 to 50 times and the rows were "a list of numbers starting with one thousand, descending by hundreds to one hundred, then descending by tens to ten, then by ones to one, and then the fractions down to 1/144".

== See also ==
- Egyptian calendar
- Augustalis, whose 84-year cycle Victorius replaced
- Dionysius Exiguus, whose cycle replaced Victorius's
- Easter controversy & computus
