= Dionysius Exiguus' Easter table =

Ecclesiastical table constructed in 525

Dionysius Exiguus's Easter table is a 95-year cyclic table for calculating the date of Easter, constructed in the year 525 by Dionysius Exiguus. The table was created for the years 532–626. This table introduced the first use of the modern system of numbering years, where the last year of the old table, Diocletian Anno Martyrium 247, was immediately followed by the first year of Dionysius' table, Anno Domini 532.

Dionysius obtained the table from an Easter table attributed to Patriarch Cyril of Alexandria for the years 437–531. The latter was constructed around the year 440 by means of extrapolation from an Alexandrian Easter table constructed around the year 390 by Patriarch Theophilus of Alexandria. The great historical importance of Dionysius' Easter table is twofold:

1. From this Easter table Bede's Easter cycle was ultimately developed by means of which all future Julian calendar dates of Easter Sunday are determined (as in column G of Dionysius' table);
2. With his Easter table Dionysius introduced the Christian era (see column A of Dionysius' table) which was developed later into a full system for dating historical events by Bede two centuries later.
