= Collectio canonum quadripartita =

Medieval canon law collection

- Folio 3v from the Stuttgart manuscript, showing the beginning of Book 1 of the Quadripartita
- Also known as: Quadripartitus
- Language: medieval Latin
- Date: ca. 850
- Manuscript(s): nine
- First printed edition: no complete edition
- Genre: canon law collection
- Subject: penance, church discipline
- Sources: Collectiones Dacheriana and Remensis; Halitgar's penitential

The Collectio canonum quadripartita (also known as the Collectio Vaticana or, more commonly, the Quadripartita) is an early medieval canon law collection, written around the year 850 in the ecclesiastical province of Reims. It consists of four books (hence its modern name 'quadripartita', or 'four-parted'). The Quadripartita is an episcopal manual of canon and penitential law. It was a popular source for knowledge of penitential and canon law in France, England and Italy in the ninth and tenth centuries, notably influencing Regino's enormously important Libri duo de synodalibus causis ('Two books concerning diocesan affairs'). Even well into the thirteenth century the Quadripartita was being copied by scribes and quoted by canonists who were compiling their own collections of canon law.

This work should not be confused with the early twelfth-century Latin translation of Old English law known as the Quadripartitus.

== Background ==
The complementary acts of confession and penance, originally highly ritualized acts undertaken only once in a lifetime and in public fora, developed in the early Middle Ages into a disciplinary system known as private (or 'secret') penance, in which the faithful were encouraged to confess their sins regularly and in secret to a priest or confessor, who then enjoined an appropriate period of punishment. Through the Middle Ages the private penitential system became an increasingly elaborate and ritualized institution. In its earliest form, however―that is, as it was practiced from around the sixth to eighth centuries―this system was dependent upon the transmission of basic lists of sins (often sexual in nature, though also dietary, criminal and profane) and their corresponding punishments. These short lists of sins made up a genre of texts known as the 'penitential handbook' (or just 'penitential'). Penitentials were first employed as disciplinary tools by Irish and British monks living in cloistered, highly ascetical religious communities, but soon spread to England and France, where they developed into varied and grander forms. By the eighth century, penitentials had adopted a focus on lay sins; they were now commonly used by secular priests in their task of hearing confession from lay parishioners, and by bishops as tools for moral instruction. Their popularity was rivalled only by their variety; as the number of manuals in circulation grew, so did the discrepancies between them. This gave rise during the early ninth century to a backlash against the diversity of penitentials and the diversity of disciplinary and theological 'errors' which they propagated. A number of Frankish councils demanded that the laws of the older penitentials be brought into line with the accepted canonical norms of the church, as reflected in the more conservative collectiones canonum (canon law collections) being compiled at the time. Partly as a result of such efforts towards standardization, the older penitentials eventually fell out of use and were replaced by the large collections of penitential and canon law which dominated in France and Italy in the tenth and eleventh centuries.

During the Carolingian period there evolved two different yet overlapping contexts in which the penitentials were used. The first of these was the pastoral context of confession between priest and parishioner. The second was an administrative and/or academic context, in which books of penitential law typically served bishops in their roles as administrators of local dioceses, adjudicators at judicial synods and students of moral philosophy and canon law. Naturally, the penitential required by a bishop was very different from that required by the confessor-priest, and it is largely within this episcopal context that the penitentials evolved from mere manuals into vast collections of penitential, disciplinary and administrative law. By the ninth century, chapters from penitential manuals had entered many of the influential canon law collections then being copied and compiled on the Continent. Since at least the fifth and sixth centuries, canon law collections could boast of being repositories of the ancient and authoritative conciliar and papal judgements of the Christian church. As such, these collections had at first stood in stark contrast to the early penitentials, whose lists of sins and corresponding penances was neither ancient nor authoritative. In time, however, the genres of collectio and penitential blended together. As canon law collections succumbed to revision and abandoned (or at least complicated) their claims to antique authority by including newer and less authoritative laws, it became more common for them to include penitential canons. The collections began to look more like penitentials, even as penitentials everywhere were beginning to take on characteristics (size, systematization, papal and conciliar laws) of the more 'formal' collectiones. Problems of textual stability and genre were further exacerbated by the fact that no one code or collection of canon law claimed status as the recognized standard. It was in this context of fluctuating generic and textual boundaries in France that the Quadripartita developed.

== Composition ==
The first book treats the life, preaching, judgement and duty of priests; the second and third books discuss at length the purpose and use of private confession and penance, as well as the nature of sin; the fourth book contains nearly 400 short chapters drawn from conciliar, papal, patristic, penitential, and monastic sources, concerning all manner of disciplinary issues. Books 3 and 4 are significantly longer than books 1 and 2. Scholars have divided the Quadripartita into a number of component parts, including a dedicatory letter ('DL'), a brief list of authorities used ('Auctoritätenkataog', or 'AK'), a list or register of titles for each book ('R1, 'R2', 'R3', 'R4'), a general preface ('GP'), prefaces for books 2–4 ('P2–4'), the text or canons of the four books ('T1–4') and an Epilogue ('Ep').

== Manuscripts and transmission ==
There are nine extant manuscripts which contain the Quadripartita, dating from as early as the ninth century to as late as the twelfth, ranging geographically from Italy to England. The sigla given below (Z, M, etc.) are those introduced by Michael Elliot.

Siglum	Manuscript	Contents
Z	Antwerp, Museum Plantin-Moretus, M 82 (66), folios 52–100 (written first half of twelfth century in northeast France)	Quadripartita (P4, T4 – Ep); decretals; Capitula Antwerpiensia; canonical excerpts
M	Monte Cassino, Archivio dell'Abbazia, Cod. 541 (previously 552) (written beginning of eleventh century in southern Italy)	Cresconius, Concordia; theological material (creeds, etc.); epistles/decretals; Collectio Dionysiana (an abbreviation); Collectio Dacheriana (B); Quadripartita (P4, R4, T4 – Ep); chapters on baptism
U	Oxford, Bodleian Library, Bodley 718 (written second half of tenth century, in either Sherborne, Canterbury or Exeter)	Paenitentiale Ecgberhti (with Ghaerbald's Capitula episcoporum I interpolated); confessional ordines; Quadripartita (R2, T2 – P3, R3, T3 – P4, R4, T4 – Ep); three conciliar canons; Collectio Hibernensis (excerpts)
S	Stuttgart, Württembergische Landesbibliothek, MS HB VII 62 (written near end of ninth century in Lake Constance region)	Quadripartita (DL, AK – GP, R1, T1 – P2, R2, T2 – P3, R3, T3 – P4, R4, T4 – Ep); several patristic excerpts
T	Trier, Stadtbibliothek, MS 1084/115, folios 103r–128v (written eleventh century probably in the province of Trier)	Quadripartita (DL, AK – GP, R1, T1 – P2, R2, T2 – P3, R3, T3 [chapters 1–10 only])
X	Vatican City, Biblioteca Apostolica Vaticana, Vat. lat. 1347 (written between ca 850 and 875 at/near Reims)	Cresconius, Concordia (fragmentary); theological material (Nicene Creed, etc.); epistles/decretals; Collectio Dacheriana (B); Quadripartita (P4, R4, T4 – Ep)
Y	Vatican city, Biblioteca Apostolica Vaticana, Vat. lat. 1352 (written second half of eleventh century in Italy)	Quadripartita (DL – GP, R1, T1 – P2, R2, T2 – P3, R3, T3 – P4, R4, Burchard, Decretum (excerpts), T4 – Ep); Burchard, Decretum (excerpts)
V	Vendôme, Bibliothèque Municipale, 55 (s. xi, Vendôme)	Quadripartita (DL, AK – GP, R1, T1 – P2, R2, T2 – R4, T4 – Ep); Ghaerbald, Capitula episcoporum I; Collectio canonum 53 titulorum
W	Vienna, Österreichische Nationalbibliothek, lat. 1286 (written first half of twelfth century in Austria)	Quadripartita (DL, AK – GP, R1, T1 – P2, R2, T2 – P3, R3, T3 – P4, R4, T4 – Ep)

The table above shows how the Quadripartita often circulated in incomplete form, no doubt as a result of the kinds of textual trauma and experimentation which anonymous collections typically experienced at the hands of medieval canonists. Of the nine manuscripts extant today which contain the Quadripartita six contain the collection without its full complement of four books. One can see from the manuscript evidence that some copies circulated without Book 1 (O), some without Book 3 (Vd), and some without Book 4 (Tr). More often than not, however, the entire four-book collection seems to have been transmitted intact (St, V_{11}, W). Some copies transmitted only Book 4 (An), which could sometimes be found tacked onto the end of the Collectio Dacheriana (Mc, V_{10}). This complex textual transmission, as well as the collection's wide distribution throughout France, Germany, Italy and England between the ninth and twelfth centuries, are indicative of the versatility of the Quadripartita and its popularity as a manual of penitential and canon law in the early Middle Ages.

== Authorship ==
The Quadripartita is now understood to be an anonymous work. However, since the seventh century the Quadripartita has been attributed variously to Hrabanus Maurus, Ecgberht of York and Halitgar of Cambrai (only in O is the Quadripartita directly associated with the works of a named author, Ecgberht).

== Reception ==
The variety of forms in which the Quadripartita circulated, and the variety of texts and contexts with which it is associated in the extant manuscripts, speak to a lively, if uneven and unauthorized reception. Beyond what can be gleaned directly from the surviving manuscript evidence, however, it is now known that the Quadripartita influenced significantly at least nine, and perhaps as many as ten, canon law collections composed between the ninth and the thirteenth centuries, particularly in northeast France and the region around Trier. These are:

- the Collectio Mediolanensis II, written second half of ninth century near Rheims
- Regino of Prüm's Libri duo de synodalibus causis, written ca. 906 at Trier
- the Collectio Wigorniensis (a.k.a. Excerptiones pseudo-Ecgberhti), written ca. 1005 in England
- the Collectio Sinemuriensis, written shortly after 1067 at Reims
- the Collection Brugensis, written end of eleventh century, of uncertain origin
- the Collectio tripartita commonly attributed to Ivo of Chartes, written ca 1100 at Chartres
- the collection that is Cambridge, Corpus Christi College 442, written after 1100 in northern France
- the collection that is Trier, Stadtbibliothek, MS 1098/14, written twelfth century at Trier
- the collection that is Paris, Bibliothèque Nationale, nouv. acq. lat. 352, written end of thirteenth century in northern France
- and (possibly) the Collection 5 librorum, written about 1020 in central or southern Italy

== Editions ==
The Quadripartita has never been edited critically, nor has it been printed in full. However, since the seventeenth century, a number of partial editions have appeared. To date, only books 3 and 4 have been printed in full:

- Book 2, chapter 1.
  - Earl R. P. of Selborne, Ancient facts and fictions concerning churches and tithes, second edition, with supplement (London, 1892), 329–30.
- Book 2, chapters 17–52.
  - H. Spelman, ed., Concilia, decreta, leges, constitutiones in re ecclesiarum orbis Britannici ... ab initio christianæ ibidem religionis, ad nostram usque ætatem ... Tom. I: ... a primis Christi seculis usque ad introitum Normannorum ... (London, 1639), 276–78 (printing from O).
  - Conciliorum omnium generalium et provincialium collectio regia, 37 vols (Paris, 1644), XVII, 512–16 (reprinting Spelman).
  - P. Labbè and G. Cossart, eds, Sacrosancta concilia, ad regiam editionem exacta quæ nunc quarta parte prodit auctior, 17 vols (Paris, 1671–1672), VI, cols 1601–04 (reprinting the Collectio regia).
  - J. Hardouin, ed., Acta conciliorum et epistolae decretales, ac constitutiones summorum pontificum, 11 vols (Paris, 1726, for 1714–1715), III, 1976–79 (reprinting Labbè-Cossart).
  - G. D. Mansi, ed., Sacrorum conciliorum nova et amplissima collectio, 31 vols (Florence, 1759–1798); repr. in 53 volumes with supplementary material by J. B. Martin (Paris, 1901–1927; repr. Graz, 1960–1961), XII, 459–482 (reprinting Labbè-Cossart).
  - J.-P. Migne, ed., Patrologiæ cursus completus sive bibliotheca universalis ... omnium SS. patrum, doctorum scriptorumque ecclesiasticorum qui ab ævo apostoloca ad usque Innocentii III tempora floruerunt ... series prima (latina) (Paris, 1844–1855), LXXXIX, cols 431B–436A (reprinting Mansi).
- Book 3 (from a now lost manuscript)
  - G. Colvener, ed., Magnentii Hrabani Mauri ex abbate Fuldensi opera, quæ reperiri potuerunt omnia in sex tomos distincta, collecta primum industria Iacobi Pamelii ... nunc vero in lucem emissa cura ... Antonii de Henin, 6 vols in 3 (Cologne 1626–1627), VI, 130–55.
  - Migne, ed., Patrologiae latina, CXII, cols 1333–1398C (reprinting Colvener).
- Book 4 (from V_{10} and V_{11})
  - Richter, ed., Antiqua canonum collectio.
- incipits and explicits of entire collection as found in St have been published by
  - L. Fowler-Magerl's Clavis canonum, analyzed as collection 'QU'.

In addition, the dedicatory letter, prefaces of all four books and the epilogue have been printed various times:

- Colvener, ed., Hrabani Mauri opera,
  - printed P3 from a now lost manuscript.
- E. Martène and U. Durand, eds, Veterum scriptorum et monumentorum historicorum, dogmaticorum, moralium, amplissima collectio, 9 vols (Paris 1724–1733; repr. New York, 1968), I, cols 70E–76D,
  - printed DL, AK, GP, P2, R3, P3, R3 from Tr.
- Theiner, Disquisitiones criticae, 334 n. 3,
  - printed P4 and Ep from Mc.
- Wasserschleben, Beitraege zur Geschichte der vorgratianischen Kirchenrechtsquellen, 4–5,
  - printed P4 from V_{10} and V_{11}.
- Richter, ed., Antiqua canonum collectio,
  - printed DL, P2, P3 and Ep from Tr.
- Maassen, Geschichte der Quellen und der Literatur des canonischen Rechts im Abendlande, 853 n 2 and 853–55,
  - printed DL (partial), AK and GP (partial) from W
- Selborne, Ancient facts, 327–31,
  - printed DL, GP, R1, P2, P3, P4 and Ep from O and V_{11}

== Bibliography ==
- J. Baron, ed., A collection of all the ecclesiastical laws, canons, answers, or rescripts, with other memorials concerning the government, discipline and worship of the church of England ... translated into English with explanatory notes ... by John Johnson. A new edition. Volume 1, (Oxford, 1850; originally published London, 1720), note to p. 223.
- J. Baron, Report on the Anglo-Saxon documents in Wilkins's Concilia (private printing, 1859), 8.
- M. Bateson, 'The supposed Latin penitential of Egbert and the missing work of Halitgar of Cambrai', The English historical review 9 (1894), 320–26.
- G. and P. Ballerini, Sancti Leonis Magni romani pontificis opera, post Paschasii Quesnelli recensionem ad complures et praestantissimos MSS. codices ab illo non consultos exacta, emendata, et ineditis aucta ..., 3 vols, ed. G. and P. Ballerini (Venice, 1753–1757), III, cols 272–73; repr. Patrologiae latina, LVI, cols 300D–302A.
- J. E. Cross and A. Hamer, eds, Wulfstan's canon law collection, Anglo-Saxon texts 1 (Cambridge, 1999), 32–3.
- P. Fournier and G. Le Bras, Histoire des collections canoniques occident depuis les Fausses décrétales jusqu'au Décret de Gratien. Vol. I: de la réforme Carolingienne a la réforme Grégorienne, Bibliothèque de l'histoire du droit 4 (Paris, 1931; repr. Aalen, 1972), 110.
- Linda Fowler-Magerl, Clavis canonum: selected canon law collections before 1140. Access with data processing, MGH Hilfsmittel 21 (Hanover, 2005), 59–60.
- A. W. Haddan and W. Stubbs, eds, Councils and ecclesiastical documents relating to Great Britain and Ireland, 3 vols (vol. II in 2 parts), (Oxford, 1869–73; repr. 1964), I, xv–xvi, III, 413–16.
- F. Kerff, Der Quadripartitus: ein Handbuch der karolingischen Kirchenreform. Überlieferung, Quellen und Rezeption, Quellen und Forschung zum Recht im Mittelalter 1 (Sigmaringen, 1982).
- L. Kéry, Canonical collections of the early Middle Ages (ca. 400–1140): a bibliographical guide to manuscripts and literature, History of medieval canon law 1 (Washington, D.C., 1999), 167–69.
- R. Kottje, Die Bußbücher Halitgars von Cambrai und des Hrabanus Maurus. Ihre Überlieferung und ihre Quellen, Beiträge zur Geschichte und Quellenkunde des Mittelalters 8 (Berlin, 1980), 183–84.
- Kottje, 'Eine Antwerpener Handschrift des Quadripartitus 1.IV', Bulletin of medieval canon law 6 (1976), 65–7.
- G. Le Bras, 'Un manuscrit vendômois du Quadripartitus', Revue des sciences religieuses 11 (1931), 266–69.
- F. Maassen, Geschichte der Quellen und der Literatur des canonischen Rechts im Abendlande. Band I: die Rechtsammlungen bis zur Mitte des 9. Jahrhunderts (Graz, 1870; repr. Graz, 1956), 852–63.
- E. L. Richter, ed., Antiqua canonum collectio qua in libris de synodalibus causis compilandis usus est Regino Prumiensis. Ex apographo cod. MS. Vat. 1347 brevi adnotatione critica instructam (Marburg, 1844).
- H J. Schmitz, ed., Die Bussbücher und die Bussdisciplin der Kirche, nach handschriftlichen Quellen dargestellt (Mainz, 1883; repr. Graz, 1958), 716–19.
- Earl R. P. of Selborne, Ancient facts and fictions concerning churches and tithes, second edition, with supplement (London, 1892), 235–41 and 327–31 (the first edition, which lacks some relevant material, is available through Google Books).
- A. Theiner, Disquisitiones criticae in praecipuas canonum et decretalium collectiones seu, sylloges Gallandianae dissertationum de vetustis canonum collectionibus continuatio (Rome, 1836), 334–37.
- C.Vogel, Les 'libri paenitentiales', Typologie des sources du moyen âge occidental 27 (Turnhout, 1978), 80–3.
- F. W. A. Wasserschleben, Beitraege zur Geschichte der vorgratianischen Kirchenrechtsquellen (Leipzig, 1839), 3–10.
- F. W. A. Wasserschleben, ed., Reginonis abbatis Prumiensis Libri duo de synodalibus causis et disciplinis ecclesiasticis (Leipzig, 1840), x–xi].
