= Egyptian Church Ordinance =

The Egyptian Church Ordinance is an early Christian collection of canons regulating the main features of church life.

It contains thirty-one canons regulating ordination, liturgy and other features of church life. It is called Egyptian because it first became known in the West in languages connected with Egypt.

In 1883, Lagarde published the same canons in Sahidic (Upper Egyptian) from an excellent manuscript of 1006 CE. This text was translated into German by G. Steindorff and this translation was published by H. Achelis (Harnack, "Texte und Untersuchungen", VI, 4). In 1900, E. Hauler discovered a very ancient Latin translation in a manuscript of the fifth or sixth century. This translation is of great value because it apparently is slavishly literal, and it contains the liturgical prayers, which are omitted in the Bohairic and Sahidic. The original text, though not yet found, was doubtlessly Greek.
