= Halitgar =

Halitgar (Halitgarius, Halitcharius, Halitgaire, Aligerio) was a ninth-century bishop of Cambrai (in office 817–831). He is known also as an apostle to the Danes, and the writer of a widely known penitential.

== Life ==
In 822 he travelled to Denmark as a missionary with Ebbo of Rheims and Willeric of Bremen, though not to great immediate effect. In 823 he dedicated the church and relics of St Ursmer at Lobbes. In 825, with Amalarius of Metz, he carried the conclusions of a Paris synod on iconoclasm to Louis the Pious. He went as ambassador to Byzantium in 828.

== De Paenitentia ==
His De Paenitentia laid down qualities Christians should aspire to in their lives. He discussed a distinction between killing in warfare (a sin), and in self-defense in battle. Heavy penances for homosexual acts were imposed on older men. The work is also a source for information about surviving pagan practices.

It was written in five volumes, at Ebbo's request. Ebbo's intention was to have a normative penitential; Halitgar set aside tariffs of penances for exhortations. This work and the two attributed to Hrabanus Maurus were considered to supersede those written before, and were very influential, particularly in pre-Norman England. At this point, "the books used by confessors began to consist more and more of instructions in the style of the later moral theology".

His sources have been much debated:

- material from Gregory the Great, Prosper of Aquitaine, the Collectio Acheriana
- the Canons of Elvira and other old collections
- Julianus Pomerius
- a source common to Halitgar, the Collectio quadripartita, and the penitential writings of Hrabanus Maurus.
