= Laurentius Suslyga =

Polish Jesuit historian, chronologist, and author of Baroque visual poetry

- Born: 1570; Poland
- Died: 1640 (aged 69–70); Poland
- Known for: the first to suggest that Christ was born in or before 4 BC, not in AD 1 or in 1 BC
- Scientific career
- Fields: History, chronology
- Workplaces: University of Graz, Austria

Laurentius Suslyga or Laurence Suslyga (Polish: Wawrzyniec Susliga or Susłyga) (1570–1640), was a Polish Jesuit historian, chronologist, and an author of Baroque visual poetry. He was the first person to claim that Jesus Christ was born in or before 4 BC, not in AD 1 or in 1 BC, as the Christian era would imply. Suslyga was thus questioning the Anno Domini chronology introduced by Dionysius Exiguus in AD 525. Suslyga presented this theory in his 1605 doctoral thesis entitled Theoremata de anno ortus et mortis Domini, deque universa Jesu Christi in carne oeconomia at the University of Graz. Among other arguments, Suslyga's treatise included the following: Herod's son, Philip the Tetrarch, renamed a city (Bethsaida) after Augustus's biological daughter, Julia. Since she had been exiled from Rome by Augustus in 2 BC, Suslyga assumed that Philip must have renamed the city prior to that date, and Herod must have died prior to Philip's becoming a ruler, which pushes the Massacre of the Innocents at least 3, if not more, years before AD 1. Dionysius Exiguus' chronology did need to be questioned; his chronology did not even match the point of view of the early Christians. The Church Fathers generally believed that Jesus was born either in the 41st or 42nd year of the reign of Augustus (consulship, principate, etc.), that is in 3 or 2 BC.

Suslyga's work was used by Kepler to bolster the astronomer's theory that the Star of Bethlehem was perhaps a new star which may have appeared during or following the great conjunction of Jupiter and Saturn in 7 BC (later joined by Mars in 6 BC). In AD 1604, Kepler had witnessed the appearance of a nova in the region between the two planets during a similar Jupiter / Saturn great conjunction. He suggested that perhaps a new star, a miraculous "stella nova," had possibly been associated with the conjunctions in 7/6 BC, as had happened in AD 1604. According to the biblical account, the wise men indicated that Christ's birth happened within a year or two of the appearance of the star. Kepler's scenario seemed to offer a logical explanation concerning the star of Bethlehem, while lending astronomical support to Suslyga's chronological ideas.

Suslyga's ideas about the renaming of Bethsaida have also been challenged. Frederick M. Strickert and others have pointed out that the identity of Augustus’ daughter in Flavius Josephus' texts about the renaming of Bethsaida (Antiquities of the Jews 18.2.1, The Wars of the Jews 2.9.1) is not beyond dispute. It was assumed by Suslyga and many other scholars in recent centuries that Josephus was referring to Julia the Elder, the biological daughter of the emperor Augustus, concerning the renaming of Bethsaida as Julias. However, through his will, Augustus also officially adopted his wife Livia into the Julian family as his daughter, and gave her a new name, Julia. It is by her name Julia that Josephus always made reference to Livia, the emperor’s wife, even in his descriptions of events before Augustus’ death and deification in AD 14. The Roman historian Velleius Paterculus (c. 19 BC - c. AD 31) confirms that Livia was known as Augustus’ daughter: “Take for example Livia. She, the daughter of the brave and noble Drusus Claudianus, most eminent of Roman women in birth, in sincerity, and in beauty, she, whom we later saw as the wife of Augustus, and as his priestess and daughter after his deification.” Many scholars now believe that Philip renamed Bethsaida as Julias in honor of Livia (Julia) following her death in AD 29. This would also explain why the name Julias persisted for generations. Otherwise the name would have probably disappeared not long after the disgrace of Julia the Elder. Pliny the Elder uses the name Julias for Bethsaida in about AD 77 and Claudius Ptolemy, the geographer, uses it in the second century AD. Identifying Julias with Livia, instead of Julia the Elder, essentially renders invalid one of Suslyga’s main arguments for a 4 BC date of the death of Herod the Great.
