= Bede's Easter cycle =

In the year 616 an anonymous scholar extended Dionysius Exiguus' Easter table to an Easter table covering the years 532 up to and including 721. Dionysius's table was published in 525 and only a century later accepted by the church of Rome, which from the third century up till then had given preference to go on using its own, relatively inadequate, Easter tables. From about the middle of the seventh century all controversy between Alexandria and Rome as to the correct date of Easter ceased, as both churches were now using identical tables.

In the year 725 Bede (Latin name Beda Venerabilis) published a new extension of Dionysius's Easter table to a great Easter cycle, which is periodic in its entirety and in which consequently not only the sequence of (Julian calendar) dates of Alexandrian Paschal full moons but also the sequence of (Julian calendar) dates of Alexandrian Easter Sundays is periodic. Bede's Easter cycle contains lunar cycles (of 19 years) as well as solar cycles (of 28 years), and therefore it has a period of 532 years.

In the Byzantine Empire thanks to the Paschal cycle of Annianus of Alexandria at all times the churches were acquainted with the correct date of the next Easter Sunday. It is Bede's Easter cycle by means of which also the churches in the part of Europe outside the Byzantine empire got that possibility.

== See also ==
- Date of Easter
