= Girolamo and Pietro Ballerini =

Italian 18th-century Catholic theologians

Girolamo and Pietro Ballerini were Italian Catholic theologians and canonists of the 18th century, brothers, who published joint works.

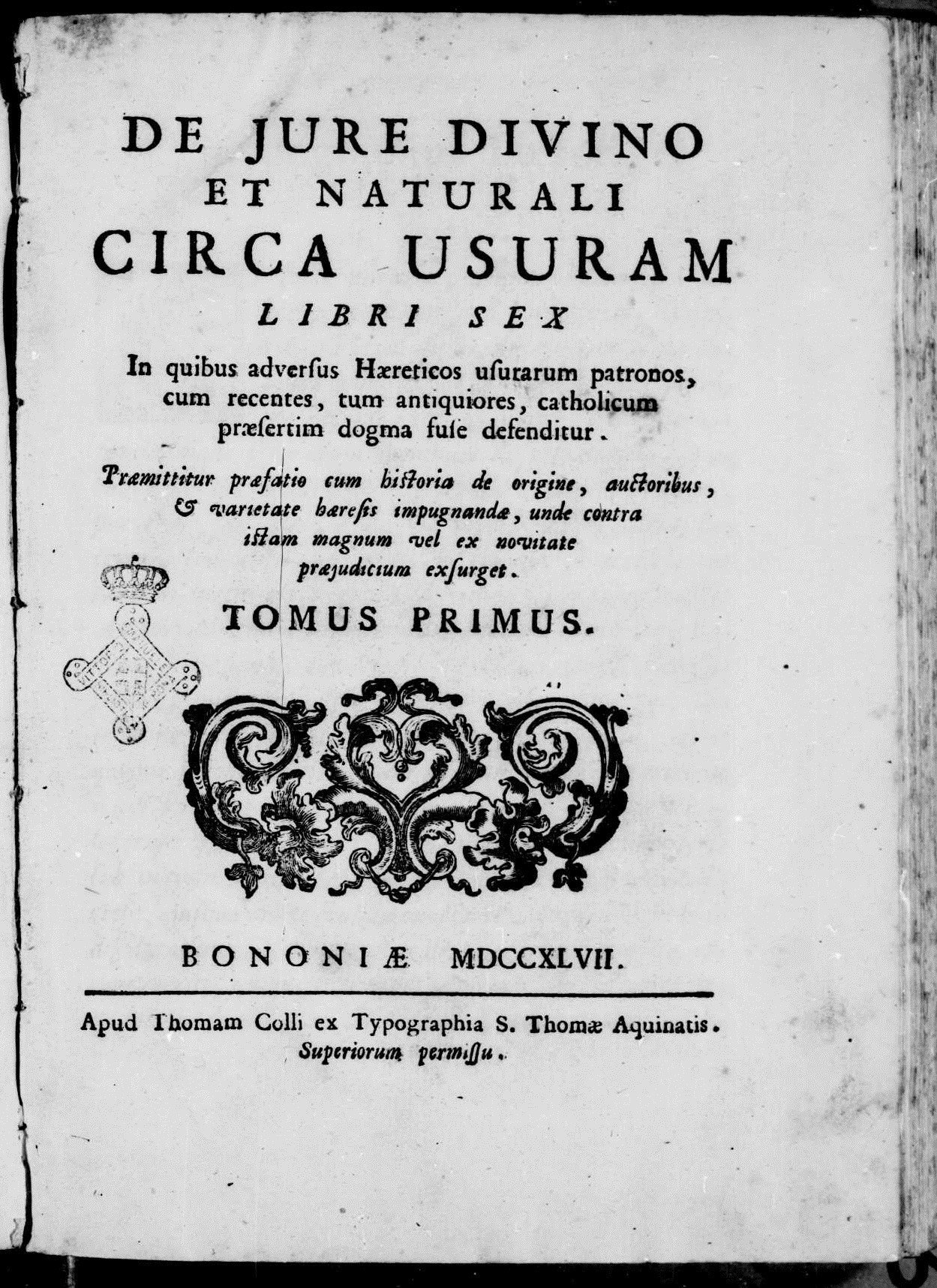
De iure divino et naturali circa usuram, 1747

They were the sons of a surgeon of Verona.

== Girolamo Ballerini ==
Girolamo was born at Verona 29 January 1701, and died 23 April 1781. After finishing his course in the Jesuit college of his native city, he entered the seminary and was ordained a secular priest.

In the pursuit of historical studies, he soon came to appreciate Cardinal Noris, also of Verona, and brought out (1729–33) a complete edition of his works.

== Pietro Ballerini ==
Born 7 September 1698; died 28 March 1769, after completing his studies both at college and the seminary was chosen principal of a classical school in Verona. Here, he began his literary career in 1724, when he prepared for his pupils a treatise on the method of study taught and followed by Augustine of Hippo. Some passages in this work gave serious offence to the school of absolute Probabilists, and for some years Pietro was engaged in a dispute with them, defending his principles of Probabiliorism in three volumes.

Shortly afterwards, he turned his attention to the question of usury, and threw his influence against the claims of the Laxists. To sustain his argument in this controversy he prepared (1740) an edition of the Summa of St. Antoninus which he sent to Pope Benedict XIV, and also (1774) one of the Summa of Raymond of Penyafort.

In the same year, he published La Dottrina della Chiesa Cattolica circa l'usura, in which he condemned all forms of usury.

The scholarship of the two editors is best seen in the fourth volume of the works of Noris, especially in their dissertations against Garerius, and in their study of the early days of the Patriarchate of Aquileia. They also published (1733) an edition of the writings of Matteo Giberti, Bishop of Verona, and in 1739 a critical edition of the sermons of St. Zeno of Verona.

The Ballerini brothers became famous throughout Italy, and in 1748 Peter was chosen by the senate of Venice to serve as its canonist in Rome in a dispute over the Patriarchate of Aquileia. He attracted the attention of Pope Benedict XIV, who commissioned him to prepare an edition of St. Leo's works in refutation of the one published by Quesnel, who was condemned on account of his Jansenism.

After almost nine years of labour in which he enjoyed free access to all the libraries of Rome, Pietro brought out his work in three volumes (Rome, 1753–57) reproducing the entire edition of Quesnel together with elaborate refutations and additions (Migne, Patrologia Latina, LIV-LVI). The third volume is a profound study of the sources of canon law. The comments contain several attacks on Jansenism and Gallicanism.

Quesnel had published a collection of canons from a codex which he believed to have been in use under Pope Innocent I, Pope Zozimus, and Leo the Great. Besides disproving this, Pietro brought out in an improved form earlier Latin editions of the canons, together with some very old unknown versions of Greek canons. He also published two works against Febronius on papal power, De vi ac ratione Primatus Romanorum Pontificum (Verona, 1766), and De potestate ecclesiastica Summorum Pontificum et Concilorum generalium (Verona, 1765).

== Works ==
- De iure divino et naturali circa usuram (in Latin). Vol. 1. Bologna: Tommaso Colli. 1747.
- De iure divino et naturali circa usuram (in Latin). Vol. 2. Bologna: Tommaso Colli. 1747.
