= Dionysius Exiguus =

Byzantine monk, inventor of AD dating

Saint Dionysius Exiguus
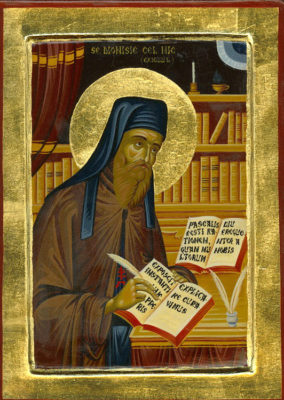
- Born: c. 470; Scythia Minor, Eastern Roman Empire
- Died: c. 544 (aged 73 or 74); Rome, Eastern Roman Empire
- Venerated in: Eastern Orthodox Church
- Canonized: 8 July 2008, Bucharest by the Synod of the Romanian Orthodox Church
- Feast: 1 September (first day of the Byzantine liturgical year)

Dionysius Exiguus (Latin for "Dionysius the Humble"; (Note: Sometimes rendered in English as Dennis the Small, the Dwarf, the Little, or the Short, referring to his humility.) Greek: Διονύσιος; c. 470 – c. 544) was a 6th-century Eastern Roman monk born in Scythia Minor and active in Rome. He was a member of a community of Scythian monks concentrated in Tomis (modern Constanța, Romania), the major city of Scythia Minor. Dionysius is best known as the inventor of Anno Domini (AD) dating, which is used to number the years of both the Gregorian calendar and the (Christianised) Julian calendar. Almost all churches adopted his computus for the dates of Easter.

From around the year 500 until his death, Dionysius lived in Rome. He translated 401 Church canons from Greek into Latin, including the Apostolic Canons and the decrees of the First Council of Nicaea, First Council of Constantinople, Council of Chalcedon, and Council of Sardica, and a collection of the decretals of the popes from Siricius to Anastasius II. These Collectiones canonum Dionysianae had great authority in the West, and they continue to guide church administrations. Dionysius also wrote a treatise on elementary mathematics.

The author of a continuation of Dionysius's Computus, writing in 616, described Dionysius as a "most learned abbot of the city of Rome", and the Venerable Bede gave him the honorific abbas. An abbas was not necessarily an abbot, but any monk, especially a senior and respected monk, and indeed Cassiodorus says in Institutiones that he was still an ordinary monk late in life.

== Origins ==
According to his friend and fellow-student, Cassiodorus, Dionysius, although by birth a "Scythian", was in character a true Roman, most learned in Greek and Latin. He was also a thorough catholic Christian and an accomplished Scripturist. The use of such an ambiguous, dated term as "Scythian" raises the suspicion that his contemporaries had difficulties classifying him, either from lack of knowledge about him personally or about his native land, Scythia Minor. By the 6th century, the term "Scythian" could mean an inhabitant of Scythia Minor, or simply someone from the north-east of the Greco-Roman world, centred on the Mediterranean. The term had a widely encompassing meaning, devoid of clear ethnic attributes. Even for the "Scythian monk" Joannes Maxentius, friend and companion of Dionysius, the two monks are "Scythian" by virtue of their geographical origin relative to Rome, just as Faustus of Riez is a "Gaul".

The dubious assertion, based on a single Syriac source, that the Eastern-Roman rebel general Vitalian, to whom Dionysius seems to have been related, was of Gothic extraction was the basis for labelling, without any further evidence, all of the Scythian monks, Dionysius included, as "Goths". In Greek and Latin sources, Vitalian is sometimes labelled with the same ambiguous term "Scytha"; he is presented as commanding "Hunnic", "Gothic", "Scythian", "Bessian" soldiers, but this information says more about the general's military endeavours, and bears little relevance to clarifying his origins. Furthermore, since none of the Scythian monks expressed any kinship, by blood or spiritual, with the Arian Goths who at that time ruled Italy, a Gothic origin for Dionysius is questionable. Vitalian seems to have been of local Latinised Thracian stock, born in Scythia Minor or in Moesia; his father bore a Latin name, Patriciolus, while two of his sons had Thracian names and one a Gothic name. By the time of the flourishing of the Scythian monks, the provinces from the Lower Danube, long since Latinised, were already a centre for the production of Latin-speaking theologians. Most likely Dionysius was also of local Thraco-Roman origin (romanized Geto–Dacian), like Vitalian's family to whom he was related, and the rest of the Scythian monks and other Thraco-Roman personalities of the era (Justin I, Justinian, Flavius Aetius, etc.).

== Works and translations ==
Dionysius translated standard works from Greek into Latin, principally the "Life of St. Pachomius", the "Instruction of St. Proclus of Constantinople" for the Armenians, the "De opificio hominis" of St. Gregory of Nyssa, and the history of the discovery of the head of St. John the Baptist (written by Archimandrite Markellos). The translation of St. Cyril of Alexandria's synodical letter against Nestorius, and some other works long attributed to Dionysius are now acknowledged to be earlier and are assigned to Marius Mercator.

Of great importance were the contributions of Dionysius to the tradition of canon law. His several collections embrace:

1. A collection of synodal decrees, of which he left two editions:
  1. Codex canonum Ecclesiæ Universæ. This contains canons of Oriental synods and councils only in Greek and Latin, including those of the four œcumenical councils from Nicæa (325) to Chalcedon (451).
  2. Codex canonum ecclesiasticarum. This is in Latin only; its contents agree generally with the other, but the Council of Ephesus (431) is omitted, while the so-called "Canons of the Apostles" and those of Sardica are included, as well as 138 canons of the African Council of Carthage (419).
  3. Another bilingual version of Greek canons, undertaken at the instance of Pope Hormisdas; only the preface has been preserved.
2. A collection of papal Constitutions (Collectio decretorum Pontificum Romanorum) from Siricius to Anastasius II (384–498).

== Anno Domini ==
Dionysius is best known as the inventor of Anno Domini dating, which is used to number the years of both the Gregorian calendar and the Julian calendar. He used it to identify the several Easters in his Easter table, but did not use it to date any historical event. When he devised his table, Julian calendar years were identified by naming the consuls who held office that year; he himself stated that the "present year" was "the consulship of Probus Junior", which he also stated was 525 years "since the incarnation of our Lord Jesus Christ". How he arrived at that number is unknown, but there is evidence of the system he applied. He invented a new system of numbering years to replace the Diocletian years that had been used in an old Easter table because he did not wish to continue the memory of a tyrant who persecuted Christians. It has been suggested that he arranged the numbers so that leap years would be exactly divisible by four, and that his new table would begin one "Victorian cycle" (see below), i.e. 532 years, after his new epoch.

Evidence exists that Dionysius' desire to replace Diocletian years with a calendar based on the incarnation of Christ was to prevent people from believing in the imminent end of the world. At the time, some believed that the Second Coming and end of the world would occur 500 years after the birth of Jesus. The current Anno Mundi calendar commenced with the creation of the world based on information in the Greek Septuagint. It was believed that, based on the Anno Mundi calendar, Jesus was born in the year 5500 (or 5500 years after the world was created) with the year 6000 of the Anno Mundi calendar marking the end of the world. Anno Mundi 6000 (c. 500) was thus equated with the second coming of Christ and the end of the world.

== Easter tables ==
In 525, Dionysius prepared a table of 95 future dates of Easter (532–626) and a set of rules ("argumenta") explaining their calculation (computus). This followed a request by Pope John I, possibly influenced by the fact that the then current Victorian table gave an Easter date for 526 (19 April) which was the 22nd day of the moon. In a previous embarrassment, this table had given Saturday, 24 April as the date of the Greek Easter in 482. Note well that only the first nine arguments are by Dionysius – arguments 10 to 16 as well as the second paragraphs of 3 and 4 and the third paragraph of 9 are later interpolations. Arguments 11 and 12 imply that these were interpolated in the year 675, shortly before Bede. Dionysius also introduced his table and arguments via a letter to a bishop Petronius (also written in 525) and added another explanatory letter (written in 526). These works in volume 67 of the 217-volume Patrologia Latina also include a letter from Bishop Proterius of Alexandria to Pope Leo (written before 457). Though not named by Dionysius, this collection was recently called his Liber de Paschate (Book on Easter) by Audette.

Dionysius ignored the existing table used by the Patriarchate of Rome, which was prepared in 457 by Victorius of Aquitaine, complaining that it did not obey Alexandrian principles, without actually acknowledging their existence. To be sure that his own table was correct, he simply extended a table prepared in Alexandria that had circulated in the west in Latin, but was never used in the west to determine the date of Easter (however, a variant of it was used in the Byzantine Empire, in Greek). The Latin table was prepared by a subordinate of Bishop Cyril of Alexandria shortly before Cyril's death in 444. It covered a period of 95 years or five decennovenal (19-year) cycles with years dated in the Diocletian Era, whose first year was 285 (the modern historical year in progress at Easter). Diocletian years were advantageous because their division by 19 yielded a remainder equal to the year of the decennovenal cycle (1–19).

Ultimately, Dionysius Exiguus' Easter table, meanwhile extended from the years 532–626 to the years 532–721, must have been adopted at Rome and also have arrived in Britain and Ireland, where, however in both cases certainly not before the second quarter of the seventh century, Victorius of Aquitaine's lunar limits 16–22 were gradually replaced with Dionysius’ lunar limits 15–21; only then the discord between the churches of Rome and Alexandria regarding the correct date for the celebration of Easter came to an end, and only from then both these authoritative churches used identical tables and hence observed Easter on the same day.

The Greek tables had begun with the new moon which fell (on 29 August) the day before the starting date of their chronology, which was 30 August 284. The epact thus calculated was carried over unchanged by Dionysius into his tables together with a number from one to seven, calculated annually, called by the Greeks the "day of the [planetary] gods" and in the west the "concurrent". This number the Greeks used for calculating the day of the week for any date in the Alexandrian civil calendar (a late form of the Egyptian solar calendar which included a final leap day every four years), which involved no more than simple arithmetic because the twelve months ran consecutively and all had thirty days. These two variables were understood neither by Dionysius nor by the other western computists, who were used to working with the age of the moon on 1 January and the Sunday letters to determine the Sundays. This is why the tables took so long to gain acceptance, but the values were eventually assimilated into the theory, the concurrent as the weekday of 24 March and the epact as the age of the moon on 22 March.

Dionysius Exiguus’ Paschal table owes its strong structure to his distant predecessor Anatolius, who invented the Metonic 19-year lunar cycle, which is an application of the Metonic cycle in the Julian calendar. Its lunar cycle is the nearby variant of Theophilus' 19-year lunar cycle proposed by Annianus and adopted by bishop Cyril of Alexandria in the first half of the fifth century. The Metonic structure of this so-called classical Alexandrian 19-year lunar cycle contained in Dionysius Exiguus’ Paschal table is reflected by the structure of its 19-year periodic sequence of epacts.

The epact, since it originally marked the new moon, was zero in all first decennovenal years. The Latin word nulla meaning no/none was used because no Roman numeral for zero existed. To determine the decennovenal year, the Dionysian year plus one was divided by 19. If the result was zero (to be replaced by 19), it was represented by the Latin word nvlla, also meaning nothing. Both "zeros" continued to be used by (among others) Bede, by whose extension of Dionysius Exiguus’ Easter table to a great Easter cycle all future Julian calendar dates of Easter Sunday were fixed unambiguously at last. However, in medieval Europe one had to wait as late as the second millennium to see the number zero itself come into use, although it had come into being around the year 600 in India.

Dionysius copied the last decennovenal cycle of the Cyrillian table ending with Diocletian 247, and then added a new 95-year table with numbered Anni Domini Nostri Jesu Christi (Years of our Lord Jesus Christ) because, as he explained to Petronius, he did not wish to continue the memory of a tyrant who persecuted Christians. The only reason he gave for beginning his new 95-year table with the year 532 was that six years were still left in the Cyrillian table after the year during which he wrote. For the current year he only stated that it was 525 years after the Incarnation of Christ, without stating when this event occurred in any other calendar. He did not realise that the dates of the Alexandrian Easter repeated after 532 years, despite his apparent knowledge of the Victorian 532-year 'cycle', indicating only that Easter did not repeat after 95 years. He knew that Victorian Easters did not agree with Alexandrian Easters, thus he no doubt assumed that they had no bearing on any Alexandrian cycle. Furthermore, he obviously did not realise that simply multiplying 19 by 4 by 7 (decennovenal cycle × cycle of leap years × days in a week) fixed the Alexandrian cycle at 532 years.

Most of the British Church accepted the Dionysian tables after the Synod of Whitby in 664, which agreed that the old British method (the insular latercus) should be dropped in favour of the Roman one. Quite a few individual churches and monasteries refused to accept them, the last holdout finally accepting them during the early 10th century. After the first Frankish adaptation of Bede's The Reckoning of Time was published (by 771), the Church of the Franks (France) accepted them during the late 8th century under the tutelage of Alcuin, after he arrived from Britain.

Ever since the 2nd century, some bishoprics in the eastern Roman Empire had counted years from the birth of Christ, but there was no agreement on the correct epoch – Clement of Alexandria (c. 190) and Eusebius of Caesarea (c. 320) wrote about these attempts. Because Dionysius did not place the Incarnation in an explicit year, competent scholars have deduced both AD 1 and 1 BC. The reason for his omission may be simply that the starting date was computationally convenient, or that he did not believe that the date of the Nativity could be pinpointed exactly. Ambiguities arise from the fact that eras may be either elapsed or current years, there are discrepancies in the lists of consuls, and there is disagreement as to whether the Incarnation should be reckoned from the Annunciation or the Nativity. Most scholars have selected 1 BC (historians do not use a year zero), arguing that because the anniversary of the Incarnation was 25 March, which was near Easter, a year that was 525 years "since the Incarnation" implied that 525 whole years were completed near that Easter. Consequently, one year since the Incarnation would have meant 25 March AD 1, meaning that Dionysius placed the Incarnation on 25 March 1 BC. Because the birth of Jesus was nine calendar months later, Dionysius implied, but never stated, that Jesus was born 25 December 1 BC. Only one scholar, Georges Declerq (Declerq, 2002), thinks that Dionysius placed the Incarnation and Nativity in AD 1, basing his conclusion on the structure of Dionysius's Easter tables. In either case, Dionysius ignored his predecessors, who usually placed the Nativity in the year we now label 2 BC. In his 1605 thesis, the Polish historian Laurentius Suslyga was the first to suggest that Christ was actually born around 4 BC, deriving this from the chronology of Herod the Great, his son Philip the Tetrarch, and the daughter of Augustus, Julia. Having read Suslyga's work, Kepler noted that Christ was born during the reign of King Herod the Great (2:1–18), whose death he placed in 4 BC. Kepler chose this year because Josephus stated that a lunar eclipse occurred shortly before Herod's death. John Pratt of the International Planetarium Society proposed the 29 December 1 BC eclipse as another eclipse. According to Josephus, Herod died in the year 4 or 3 BC.

Although Dionysius stated that the First Council of Nicaea in 325 sanctioned his method of dating Easter, that is only generally true. There was no formal canon – the Council echoed Canon 1 of the first Council of Arles (314) which had decreed that the Christian Passover be celebrated uno die et uno tempore per omnem orbem (on one day and at one time through all the world) – but added that all "celebrate Pascha at the same time as" the churches of Alexandria and Rome.

A synodal letter to the church of Alexandria states:

All our eastern brothers who up until now have not been in agreement with the Romans or you or with all those who from the beginning have done as you do, will henceforth celebrate Pascha at the same time as you.

And the letter of the Emperor Constantine to bishops who had not attended the council states:

It was judged good and proper, all questions and contradictions being left aside, that the eastern brothers follow the example of the Romans and Alexandrians and all the others so that everyone should let their prayers rise to heaven on one single day of holy Pascha.

Dionysius' method had actually been used by the Church of Alexandria (but not by the Church of Rome) at least as early as 311, and probably began during the first decade of the 4th century, its dates naturally being given in the Alexandrian calendar. Thus Dionysius did not develop a new method of dating Easter. The most that he may have done was convert its arguments from the Alexandrian calendar into the Julian calendar. The resulting Julian date for Easter was the Sunday following the first Luna XIV (the 14th day of the moon) that occurred on or after the XII Kalendas Aprilis (21 March) (12 days before the first of April, inclusive). The 14th day of the moon, Nisan 14, was the date that paschal lambs were slain (in late afternoon) until the destruction of the Second Temple in 70 prevented their continuing sacrifice, as well as the day when all leavened bread crumbs had to be collected and burned, hence Nisan 14 was the day of preparation for Passover (Lev 23:5). Alexandria may have chosen it because it was the day that Christ was crucified according to the Gospel of John (18:28, 19:14), in direct contradiction to the Synoptic Gospels (Matthew 26:17, Mark 14:12, and Luke 22:7), who state that he was crucified after he ate the Seder, his Last Supper. Then and now, the Seder was eaten after sundown at the beginning of Nisan 15. Because Dionysius's method of computing Easter used dates in the Julian calendar, it is also called the Julian Easter. This Easter is still used by all Orthodox churches, even those which have regularized the rest of their calendars with the West. The Gregorian Easter still uses the same definition, but relative to its own solar and lunar dates.

== See also ==
- Ab urbe condita
- Denis Petau
- Lunisolar calendar
