= Cuthbert Turner =

English historian (1860–1930)

Cuthbert Hamilton Turner FBA (1860–1930) was an English ecclesiastical historian and Biblical scholar. He became Dean Ireland's Professor of the Exegesis of Holy Scripture in the University of Oxford in 1920.

His major work was Ecclesiae Occidentalis Monumenta Iuris Antiquissima, often known as EOMIA, published in fascicles in the period 1899 to 1939. It is a collection of sources for canon law.

He was educated at Winchester School and New College, Oxford. He became a Fellow of New College, Oxford in 1889.

== Works ==
- The oldest manuscript of the Vulgate Gospels (Oxford 1931)
- The Gospel according to St. Mark : introduction and commentary
- Studies in Early Church History; Collected Papers
- The Study of the New Testament; an inaugural lecture delivered before the University of Oxford on October 22 and 29, 1920
- Ecclesiae Occidentalis monumenta iuris antiquissima cahonum et conciliorum graecorum interpretationes latinae
- The History and Use of Creeds and Anathemas in the Early Centuries of the Church
