= Anselm of Lucca =

Medieval bishop of Lucca, Italy

Saint Anselm of Lucca
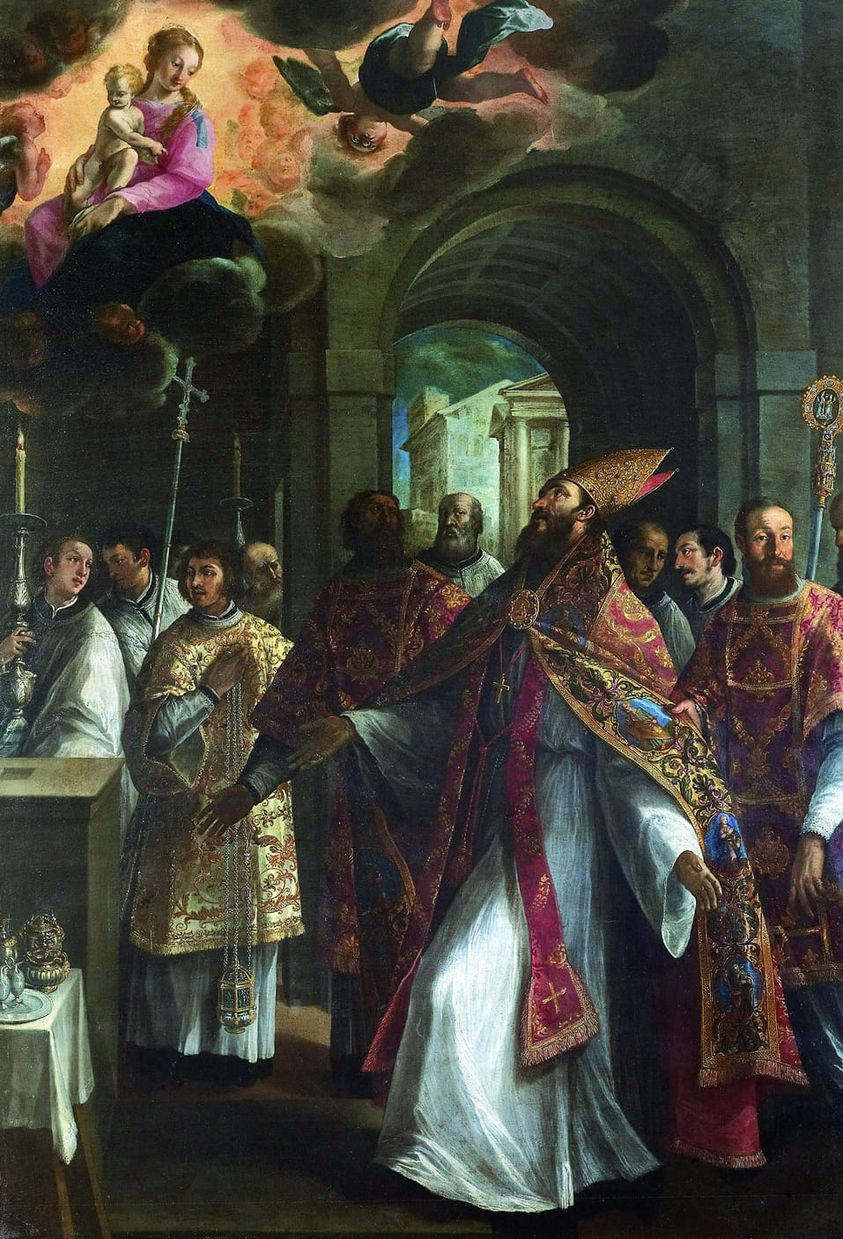

Bishop, Confessor, Saint
- Born: 1036; Milan
- Died: 18 March 1086
- Venerated in: Catholic Church
- Canonized: 1087 by Victor III
- Feast: 18 March
- Patronage: Mantua

Anselm of Lucca (Latin: Anselmus; Italian: Anselmo; 1036 – 18 March 1086), born Anselm of Baggio (Anselmo da Baggio), was a medieval bishop of Lucca in Italy and a prominent figure in the Investiture Controversy amid the fighting in central Italy between Matilda, countess of Tuscany, and Emperor Henry IV. His uncle Anselm preceded him as bishop of Lucca before being elected to the papacy as Pope Alexander II and so he is sometimes distinguished as Anselm the Younger or Anselm II.

== Life ==
Born in Mantua, and was educated there in grammar and dialectic. Anselm was a nephew of Anselm of Lucca the Elder, who became Pope Alexander II in 1061 and designated Anselm to succeed him in his former position as Bishop of Lucca. Alexander sent him to Germany advising him to take investiture from Emperor Henry IV. Alexander II, may have elevated him to the cardinalate ca. 1062.

Anselm went to Germany, but was loath to receive the insignia of spiritual power from a temporal ruler and returned without investiture. In 1073, Pope Gregory VII, again appointed Anselm Bishop of Lucca, but advised him not to accept investiture from Henry IV. For some reason, Anselm did so this time, but soon felt such remorse that he resigned his bishopric, and entered the Benedictine Order at Padilirone, a Cluniac monastery near Mantua. The Pope gave him his own mitre, to which Gaetano Moroni attributed various miracles.

Gregory VII ordered him to return to Lucca, and he reluctantly obeyed, but continued to lead the life of a monk. In the years 1077–79, he accepted the transfer of several castles from Countess Matilda, in preparation for Henry's expected campaign, which was carried out in 1081–84. Meanwhile, he attempted to impose the Rule of Saint Augustine upon the canons of Lucca Cathedral. Most of the canons refused to submit to the new regulations though they were interdicted by the pope. Anselm was expelled from Lucca around 1080, with the help of Emperor Henry and Guibert, Antipope Clement III, after the defeat of the papal defender, the Countess Matilda of Tuscany at the Battle of Volta Mantovana (October 1080).

Anselm fled first to the shelter of Moriana, an episcopal stronghold only a few miles up the Arno from Lucca and was accompanied by Bardo, a priest who later wrote his vita, and then retired to Canossa as spiritual guide to Countess Matilda. Bishop Benzo of Alba, Henry IV's fiercely partisan supporter, tells how Matilda and Anselm stripped the monasteries to send gold and silver to Gregory in Rome. Because through his prayers was obtained the rout of the enemies of Gregory VII, he is represented before an army in confusion.

Sometime later, Gregory VII made him papal legate in Lombardy, with authorization to rule over all the dioceses which had been left without bishops due to the conflict between pope and emperor.

Anselm was well versed in scripture and wrote some important works attacking lay investiture and defending Pope Gregory against Antipope Clement III and Emperor Henry IV. He spent his last years assembling a collection of ecclesiastical law canons in 13 books, which formed the earliest of the collections of canons (Collectio canonum) supporting the Gregorian reforms, which afterwards were incorporated into the well-known Decretum of the jurist Gratian. The Collectio canonum most notably revived the Justinian’s Novellae, which set the basis for Roman law in the Middle Ages.

Anselm died in Mantua on 18 March 1086 and is regarded as the patron saint of that city. Two biographies were written about the bishop-saint shortly after his death: Pseudo-Bardone’s Vita Anselmi episcopi Lucensis and Bishop Rangerius of Lucca’s, Vita metrica of S. Anselmi lucensis episcopi. Anselm was canonized by Pope Victor III in 1087.
