= The Lord's Army =

The Lord's Army may refer to many religion-oriented groups, most notably:

- Lord's Resistance Army, an armed force in central Africa
- Army of the Lord, a Romanian religious movement
