= Andrei Hoarște =

Romanian Eastern Orthodox bishop (born 1982)

Andrei (Hoarște)
- Bishop of Cleveland, Auxiliary Bishop of the Romanian Orthodox Episcopate of America
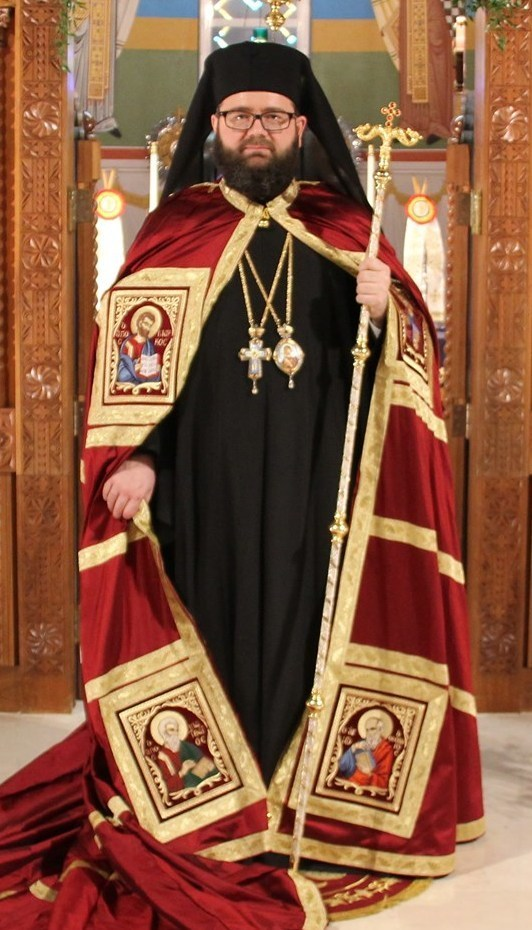
- Church: Romanian Orthodox Episcopate of America
- Appointed: November 13, 2019
- Previous post: Vicar Bishop of the Romanian Orthodox Episcopate of America

Orders
- Consecration: January 1, 2020 by Nathaniel Popp

Personal details
- Born: Andrei Hoarște; October 16, 1982 (age 43) Făgăraș, Romania
- Denomination: Eastern Orthodox Church

Bishop Andrei (secular name Dan Hoarște; born October 16, 1982) is a Romanian-American Eastern Orthodox bishop serving as the Bishop of Cleveland, auxiliary bishop of the Romanian Orthodox Episcopate of America within the Orthodox Church in America (OCA).

== Early life and education ==
Hoarște was born in Făgăraș, Romania, on October 16, 1982. His family emigrated to the United States when he was a child, settling in Michigan. Raised in a devout Orthodox household, he was actively involved in church life from an early age.

Hoarște pursued theological studies at Holy Cross Greek Orthodox School of Theology in Brookline, Massachusetts, earning a Master of Divinity.

== Ordination and monastic life ==
Hoarște was tonsured a monk and later ordained a deacon in the Romanian Orthodox Episcopate of America. He was then ordained to the priesthood and served in various capacities before being elevated to the rank of archimandrite.

== Episcopacy ==
On November 13, 2019, Hoarște was elected as auxiliary bishop of the Romanian Orthodox Episcopate of America with the title Bishop of Cleveland. His consecration took place on January 1, 2020, officiated by Nathaniel Popp, Archbishop of Detroit and the Romanian Orthodox Episcopate of America.

Since his consecration, Hoarște has assisted in overseeing the pastoral and administrative affairs of the Romanian Orthodox Episcopate of America.
