= Valerian Trifa =

Archbishop and Iron Guard Member (1914–1987)

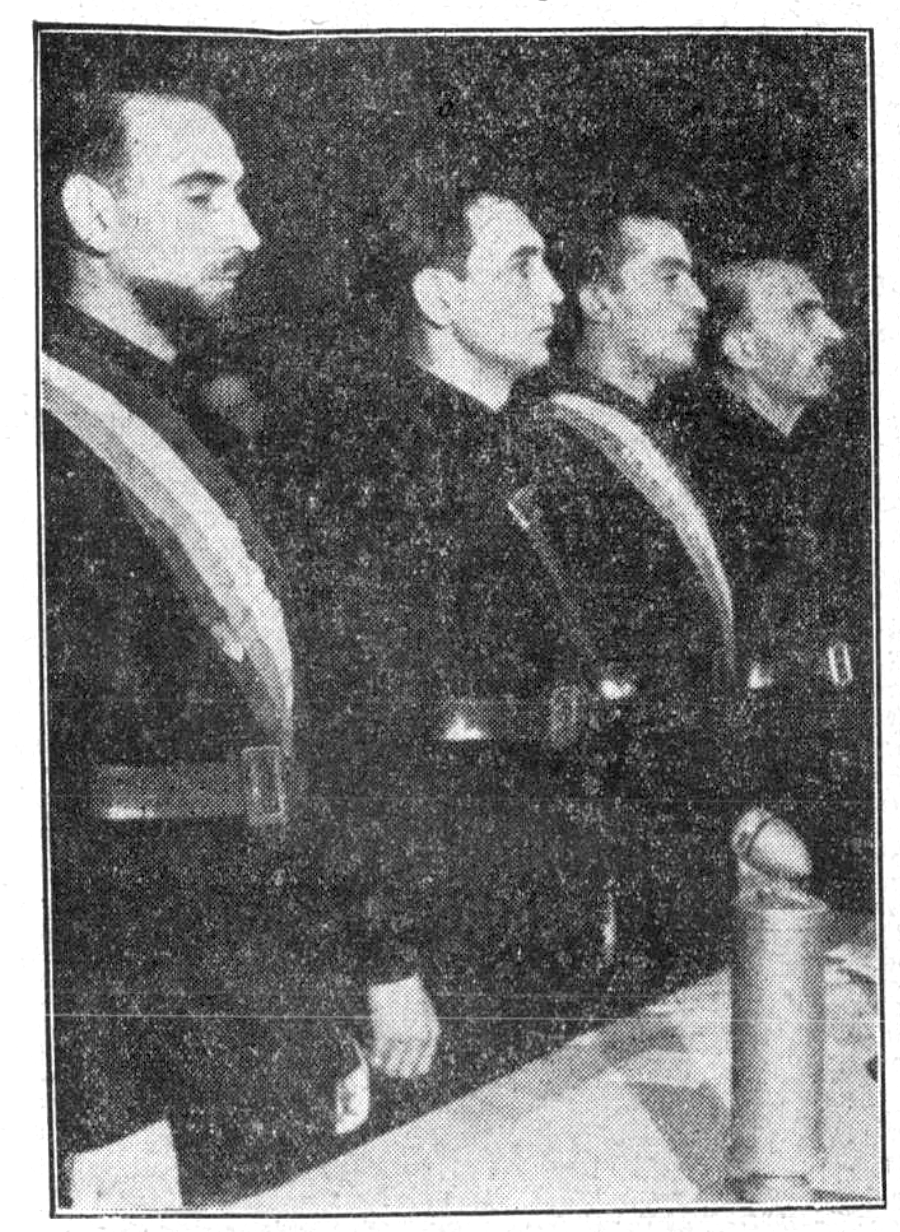
- Trifa (third from left), with Horia Sima, Traian Brăileanu, and Valeriu Neagoe at a student celebration during the National Legionary State, Bucharest, 10 December 1940
- Born: Viorel Trifa; June 28, 1914; Câmpeni, Transylvania belongs to Kingdom of Hungary (Transleithania), Austria-Hungary (now in Romania)
- Died: January 28, 1987 (aged 72); Cascais, Portugal
- Citizenship: Kingdom of Romania / Romanian People's Republic (until 1947?); United States (1957–1983)

Valerian Trifa (Romanian pronunciation: [valeriˈan ˈtrifa]; secular name Viorel Donise Trifa Romanian pronunciation: [vi.oˈrel ˈtrifa]; June 28, 1914 – January 28, 1987) was a Romanian Orthodox cleric who served as an archbishop of the Romanian Orthodox Episcopate of America. He was accused of being a fascist political activist and sympathizer, which led to his voluntary exile.

An early member of the Iron Guard, Trifa played a part in provoking the Legionnaires' Rebellion of 1941. His antisemitic discourse was alleged to have helped instigate the pogrom against the Jewish community in Bucharest. After being accused as a rebel by Ion Antonescu, he spent the final years of World War II detained in Nazi Germany. Trifa eventually made his way to the United States in 1950, where he was ordained as a bishop of the Romanian-American Orthodox community into opposition with the main Orthodox Church in Communist Romania.

In 1975, his wartime activities came to the attention of the United States Department of Justice. Trifa, to avoid drawing negative attention to the episcopate, renounced his American citizenship sometime between 1980 and 1984. (Note: Several sources disagree on the exact date of the annulment of his citizenship and of the nature of his departure.) He moved to Portugal in 1982 on a temporary visa; he was denied residency in 1984, but remained there until his death in 1987.

== Biography ==
=== Early life and activism ===
Born in Câmpeni, Transylvania (at the time in Austria-Hungary, now in Alba County, Romania), he was the son of schoolteacher Dionisie Trifa, and the nephew of Iosif Trifa, an Orthodox priest who founded Oastea Domnului ("The Lord's Army"). He studied at the school of his native village, then at the Horia Gymnasium of Câmpeni and the Gheorghe Lazăr High School of Sibiu, from which he graduated in 1931. Between 1931 and 1935, he studied theology at the University of Chișinău, graduating magna cum laude. He then studied philosophy at the University of Bucharest and, in 1939, history and journalism at the University of Berlin. Trifa's first employment was as a publisher with Oastea Domnului. There, he issued the movement's eponymous magazine, its other journal Lumina Satelor, and the books by uncle Iosif.

While a student, Trifa joined the Iron Guard and was a contributor to its Orăștie-based Libertatea newspaper; in 1940, during the National Legionary State (the period when the Iron Guard was in power), he was elected president of the National Union of Romanian Christian Students, a Legionnaire organization.

=== Legionnaires' Rebellion and the Bucharest pogrom ===
Although hostile to the Guard's new leader, Horia Sima, he became involved in the January 1941 confrontation between Sima's Legionnaires and Ion Antonescu. In early 1941, the conflict for power turned into an Iron Guard-led failed rebellion and a pogrom against the Jewish population in Bucharest where over one hundred Jews and Romanians were massacred.

The event was partly motivated by the killing of a German Reich resident and local Abwehr chief, Major Döring — which was probably accomplished with assistance from the British Intelligence Service. Trifa issued several antisemitic statements which played a part in instigating the riots. These statements included arguments such as "A group of Jews and Jew-lovers are ruling everything". In one of his manifestos, Trifa blamed the Jews for Döring's assassination, while nominating two politicians associated with Antonescu (Eugen Cristescu and the former Undersecretary of the Interior Alexandru Riosanu), whom he accused of protecting Jews. His text, he accused that Döring had been assassinated and accused Armand Călinescu, among others, as protecting and defending the assassin, while also calling for the replacement of all "Jew-turned [jidovite] persons inside the government". Trifa later claimed that he didn't write his own statements.

== Internment and early self-exile ==
Following Antonescu's repression of the rebels, Viorel Trifa fled to the Reich, where he was interned in the concentration camps of Sachsenhausen, Buchenwald and Dachau. Romanian authorities tried him in absentia and sentenced him to life imprisonment and labor. In early 1943, while in Buchenwald, Trifa was among the prominent Legionnaires who agreed to disavow Sima's policies (the group also included Vasile Iașinschi, Ilie Gârneață, Constantin Popovici, Dumitru Grozea, and Corneliu Georgescu). Allegedly this move was mediated by German officials, in hopes of reconciliating with Antonescu and the Iron Guard. While imprisoned, Trifa was visited by high-ranking Nazi officials who warned them not to engage in any political activity. In a June 2007 article, the Italian weekly L'Espresso defined Trifa as "a guest in Germany, protected by the Nazis".

After Trifa was freed, he was briefly secretary to Metropolitan bishop Visarion Puiu in Vienna and then Paris, and, following the end of World War II, he was a professor of ancient history in Italy, at a Roman Catholic college. He moved to the United States on July 17, 1950, under the Displaced Persons Act, and claimed to have been a forced laborer in the camps of Buchenwald and Dachau. His escape was possibly aided by the intervention of a high-ranking prelate. He became a naturalized citizen in 1957.

He was subsequently a writer at the Solia Romanian language newspaper in Cleveland, Ohio. At the Congress of the dissident Romanian Orthodox Church in America held in Chicago on July 2, 1951, Trifa was consecrated as a bishop and was moved to Grass Lake, Michigan, where the headquarters of the Romanian Orthodox Episcopate is located. This came after he led his congregation in occupying the residence, thus chasing away representatives of the Orthodox Church in Romania — as the latter was by then subordinated to the Romanian Communist Party. In 1955, he gave the opening prayer before the United States Senate and he became a member of the governing board of the National Council of Churches.

In 1960, as Trifa wanted to be officially attached to a recognized Orthodox authority, he sought to be attached to the Greek Orthodox Patriarchate of Antioch in America, as well as the Greek Orthodox Archdiocese in New York. However, Patriarch Justinian of Romania intervened and threatened telling them that if they accepted Trifa, the official Romanian Church would cut off all relations with them. Ten years later, he became an archbishop.

=== Department of Justice investigation ===
Investigation into his past had started as early as 1957, but it wasn't until 1975 that the United States Department of Justice began investigating Trifa under the pretenses that he entered the United States by hiding his involvement with the Iron Guard. American authorities also reported that Trifa had mentioned his internment in Nazi camps, but had not made it clear that he had benefited from preferential treatment. In October 1976, a group of members of the Concerned Jewish Youth organization took over the headquarters of the National Council of Churches building, as a protest against the refusal of the organization to oust Trifa. The archbishop was ousted from the body in November, after the Council stated that, in what concerns Nazi atrocities, "we cannot allow any doubt about a complete repudiation".

When focus shifted to his role in the 1941 Rebellion, Trifa denied his involvement, despite being confronted with evidence (sent by the Romanian government). He nevertheless admitted having lied to American authorities upon entering the United States. Further evidence against Trifa was a postcard addressed to Nazi leader Heinrich Himmler and signed by "Viorel Trifa". Trifa denied ever writing it, but, using imaging techniques, American forensic scientists managed to recover a latent fingerprint identified as belonging to him.

The Office of Special Investigations (OSI) of the U.S. Justice Department was established in 1979 for the purpose of expelling Nazi war criminals that had entered the U.S. OSI prosecuted Trifa with the intention of stripping him of his U.S citizenship and deporting him. The trial began in October 1982. Trifa wanted to avoid being returned to Romania, where he had been convicted in absentia in 1941 and sentenced to life imprisonment. He agreed to settle the case, acknowledging that he had been a member of the Iron Guard and had concealed this information when he entered the U.S. He agreed to leave the U.S. within 60 days after receiving permission to enter another country.

Israeli prosecutor Gideon Hausner pressured for the extradition of Trifa so that Israel could try him for crimes against humanity, but the Israeli government never made any official extradition claim or issued any warrants. An offer for extradition was made in April 1983 by the OSI, but was rejected by the Israeli government. When news of this refusal leaked to the Israeli press, a polemic was sparked between Hausner and Menachem Begin's executive, but the latter chose not to reconsider its earlier decision possibly due to the Israeli courts not having a strong enough case to charge Trifa with war crimes.

At the time, Trifa's early convictions caused another scandal. In May 1979, upon instructions from Noël Bernard, Radio Free Europe's Romanian contributor Liviu Floda interviewed Trifa on his Church's activities. Bernard's initiative was allegedly questioned by Floda and his employers alike. The interview's broadcast caused virulent reactions in the United States, and resulted in a hearing by a subcommittee of the United States House Committee on International Relations.

=== Renunciation of citizenship and Portuguese refuge ===
Sometime between 1980 and 1984, Trifa gave up or was stripped of his American citizenship. In 1982, he left the United States to avoid deportation due to the ongoing investigation. He had earlier agreed to deportation before an immigration judge in Detroit, explaining that the trial was placing a financial strain on his congregation. Nevertheless, his adversaries considered Trifa's action an admission of guilt, in respect to both the technical charge and the accusations of war crimes. Trifa's defense team rejected the claims, stating he had no intention of causing a pogrom, but did not deny Trifa's fascist and antisemitic convictions and speeches, including the 1941 statements, although Trifa himself claimed he didn't write his own speeches. They also argued that Trifa had acted after being forced to choose between the pro-Soviet and the pro-Nazi camps, contending that antisemitism was "rampant at the time."

After spending two years searching for a country to give him refuge, he settled in Estoril, Portugal. In an interview he gave shortly before leaving, Trifa claimed that he had "happened to get put in a moment of history when some people wanted to make a point. The point was to revive the Holocaust. But all this talk by the Jews about the Holocaust is going to backfire." In autumn 1984, the Portuguese authorities declared Trifa an undesirable, and indicated that he had failed to reveal his fascist sympathies when requesting and obtaining a temporary visa. Initially, they allowed the prelate three months to leave the country's territory. Trifa contested the decision with the Supreme Administrative Court. It was then reported that, if he was ousted from Portugal, he would go to Greece, where he might have been accepted. Trifa however died before the appeal could come to a decision during emergency treatment for a heart attack.

== Assessment ==
Beginning in the late 1980s, Ion Mihai Pacepa, a former general in the communist secret police (the Securitate) who defected to the United States, claimed that Trifa had been the victim of a frameup engineered by his former colleagues. Pacepa linked this to a trip by Romanian bishop Bartolomeu Anania to the United States, of which he claimed was a common attempt of the regime and the main Orthodox Church to quell the dissidence of Romanian-American Orthodox believers. In 2003, Noël Bernard's wife, Ioana Măgură Bernard, noted that her husband was being targeted by the Securitate, and argued that the communist institution attempted to stir up animosity inside Radio Free Europe in order to have Bernard stripped of his position. She also described Bernard's mysterious 1981 death as an assassination, arguing that it formed the culmination of various failed attempts to silence him.

Trifa's involvement in the Iron Guard affected several institutions, including the National Council of Churches, Radio Free Europe, West German law enforcement, and the Israeli and Portuguese governments, while allegations surfaced that Romania's secret police, the Securitate, was using the controversy to advance its own goals. Trifa was cited among the suspected war criminals who may have been actively aided by the Roman Catholic Church in avoiding investigation, suggesting that the frequency of such cases could help explain why Italy had been resisting the ratification needed for opening the International Tracing Service archives managed by the International Committee of the Red Cross in Bad Arolsen.

== Bibliography ==
- Pyle, Christopher (2001). Extradition, Politics, and Human Rights. Philadelphia: Temple University Press. ISBN 978-1566398237.
- Feigin, Judy; Richard, Mark M. (2006). The Office of Special Investigations: Striving for Accountability in the Aftermath of the Holocaust. US Department of Justice, Criminal Division. p. 6. ISBN 978-1632730015.
- Ornea, Z. (1995). Anii treizeci. Extrema dreaptă românească. Bucharest: Editura Fundației Culturale Române.
- Puddington, Arch (2003). Broadcasting Freedom: The Cold War Triumph of Radio Free Europe and Radio Liberty. Lexington: University Press of Kentucky. ISBN 978-0813190457.
- Stokoe, Mark; Kishkovsky, Leonid (1995). Orthodox Christians in North America (1794 - 1994). Orthodox Christian Publications Center (OCPC). ISBN 0866420533.
- Turcescu, Lucian (2010). "Fascists, Communists, Bishops, and Spies: Romanian Orthodox Churches during the Cold War". In Mojzes, Paul (ed.). North American Churches and the Cold War. Eerdmans. ISBN 978-0802875266.
