= Trifolius presbyter =

Trifolius was a Christian theologian of the sixth century. He is known for his Epistula ad beatum Faustum senatorem contra Ioannem Scytham monachum of 519/20, written to the Roman senator Faustus. It is a report on the beliefs of the Scythian monks, putting those in the context of other views condemned as heretical by the Catholic Church. It played a part in the rejection of the Theopaschite doctrine.

The "Scythian formula", according to Trifolius, was not to be found in the four Councils, and had already been condemned by the Council of Chalcedon. The "formula" refers to Unus ex Trinitate passus est. He refers to what the Council of Chalcedon had held against Carosus and Dorotheus (who were Eutychians). The Trinitarian views attributed to the Scythians he takes to be comparable with those of the Arians and Apollinarians.
