= Nathaniel Popp =

Romanian Orthodox clergyman

His Eminence, The Most Reverend Nathaniel
- Archbishop of the Romanian Episcopate
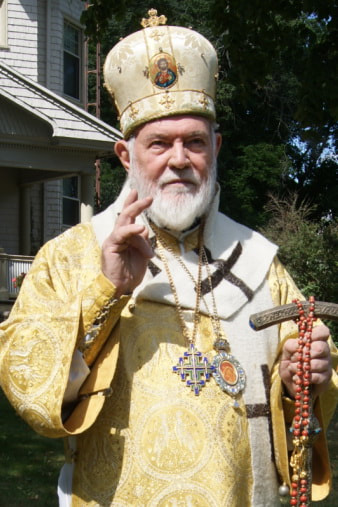
- Archdiocese: The Romanian Episcopate
- Installed: November 17th, 1984
- Term ended: Incumbent
- Predecessor: Valerian (Trifa)
- Other post: Bishop of Dearborn Heights

Orders
- Ordination: July 17, 1966 (diaconate); October 23, 1966 (priesthood)
- Consecration: November 18, 1980

Personal details
- Born: June 12, 1940 (age 86) Aurora, Illinois
- Denomination: Eastern Orthodox
- Education: Saint Procopius College; Pontifical Gregorian University

Nathaniel of Detroit (born William George Popp; June 12, 1940) is a Romanian-American Orthodox prelate who has served as Archbishop of the Orthodox Church in America's Romanian Orthodox Episcopate of America since 1984.

== Biography ==
Born to a Romanian-American family in Aurora, Illinois, Popp was ordained to the priesthood in 1966 in the Romanian Greek-Catholic Church. He soon left the Catholic Eastern Rite and, under the guidance of Archbishop Valerian Trifa of the Romanian Orthodox Episcopate of America, converted to Orthodoxy on February 15, 1968. After residing in a monastic community for several years, Popp became the rector of Holy Cross Romanian Orthodox Church in Hermitage, Pennsylvania.

On November 15, 1980, Popp was consecrated Bishop of Dearborn Heights, as an auxiliary bishop to Archbishop Trifa. He served in that role until 1984, when Trifa retired. On November 17, 1984, Popp became the ruling hierarch of the Romanian Orthodox Episcopate of America, part of the Orthodox Church in America; on October 20, 1999, the Holy Synod of the OCA elevated him to the rank of Archbishop.

Popp traveled to Romania in May 2003, where he was awarded an Honorary Doctorate from the University of Oradea. Following the resignation of Metropolitan Jonah (Paffhausen) in July 2012, Popp was appointed as the locum tenens of the OCA.

Eastern Orthodox Church titles
Preceded by None	Bishop of Dearborn Heights; 1980–1984	Succeeded by Irineu (Duvlea)
Preceded by Valerian Trifa	Archbishop of Detroit and the Romanian Episcopate; 1984–present	Succeeded by Incumbent
