= Romanian Orthodox Episcopate of America =

Diocese of OCA (Romanian Orthodox church refers to the Romanian language not ethnicity)

Coordinates: 42°13′31″N 84°13′47″W

orthodox

Location
- Country: United States
- Metropolitan: Tikhon (Mollard)

Information
- Denomination: Eastern Orthodox
- Language: English, Romanian

Current leadership
- Parent church: Orthodox Church in America
- Archbishop: Nathaniel (Popp)

Map
- States with parishes of the Romanian Episcopate

Website
- www.roea.org

The Romanian Orthodox Episcopate of America (Romanian: Episcopia Ortodoxă Română din America) is one of three ethnic dioceses (alongside the Albanian archdiocese and Bulgarian diocese) of the Orthodox Church in America (OCA), and a former diocese of the Romanian Orthodox Church.

== Description ==
The diocesan center; Vatra Românească (The Hearth of the Romanian People) is located in Grass Lake, Michigan.

Its territory includes parishes, monasteries, and missions located in 26 states of the United States, as well as six provinces in Canada – Alberta, Arizona, British Columbia, California, Colorado, Connecticut, Florida, Georgia, Illinois, Indiana, Louisiana, Manitoba, Maryland, Massachusetts, Michigan, Minnesota, Missouri, New Hampshire, New Mexico, Nevada, New York, Ohio, Ontario, Oregon, Pennsylvania, Quebec, Rhode Island, Saskatchewan, Tennessee, Texas, Virginia, and Washington. The three monasteries are:

- Transfiguration of The Lord Monastery; Ellwood Pennsylvania (1968)
- Dormition of the Holy Mother of God Monastery; Rives Junction, Michigan (1987)
- Holy Resurrection of The Lord Monastery; Temecula, California (2014)

The current Archbishop of Detroit and the Romanian Episcopate is Nathaniel Popp. He was consecrated as Bishop of Dearborn Heights and Auxiliary Bishop of the Romanian Episcopate on November 15, 1980. Bishop Nathaniel was enthroned as the ruling hierarch of the diocese on November 17, 1984, following the retirement of Archbishop Valerian (Trifa). He was elevated to the rank of Archbishop on October 20, 1999. On February 1, 2020 Archimandrite Andrei (Secular Name: Dan) Hoarște was consecrated Auxiliary/ Vicar Bishop of the Romanian Orthodox Episcopate of America; at the Diocesan Cathedral of Saint George in (Southfield) Detroit, Michigan. With attendance of All Clergy of the Episcopate and OCA Bishops.

== Deaneries ==
The diocese is grouped geographically into seven deaneries, each consisting of a number of parishes. The current deaneries of the Romanian Episcopate are:

- Atlantic Deanery
- Deanery of Canada
- Great Lakes Deanery
- Central United States Deanery
- Pacific Northwest Deanery
- Pacific Southwest Deanery
- Southern Deanery

Each deanery is headed by a parish priest, known as a dean. The deans coordinate activities in their area's parishes, and report to the Diocesan Bishop(s). The Deans of each Deanery are:

- Atlantic Deanery; Very Reverend Protosinghel Doctor Chesarie Bertea, Ph.D
- Deanery of Canada; Very Reverend Father Liviu Alexandrescu
- Great Lakes Deanery; Very Reverend Protopresbyter Doctor Remus Grama
- Central United States Deanery; Very Reverend Father George Ursache
- Pacific Northwest Deanery; Reverend Father Gabriel Agoston
- Pacific Southwest Deanery; Very Reverend Father Adrian Grigoras
- Southern Deanery; Reverend Father Stefan Stoleru

== See also ==
- Romanian Orthodox Metropolia of the Americas
- Assembly of Canonical Orthodox Bishops of the United States of America
- Assembly of Canonical Orthodox Bishops of Canada
