= Cornel Chiriac =

Romanian musician, journalist and radio producer (1941–1975)

Cornel Chiriac in the studio

Cornel Chiriac (May 8, 1941, Romania – March 4, 1975, West Germany) was a Romanian journalist, radio producer, record producer and jazz drummer.

== Early life ==
Chiriac was born on May 8, 1941, in Uspenca, a Bessarabian village (previously in Cetatea Albă County, Kingdom of Romania, now in Odesa Oblast, Ukraine).

He went to high school in Pitești and graduated from the University of Bucharest's Faculty of English Language. Chiriac made his radio debut in 1963, with the show Jazz of Yesterday and Today, later Jazz magazin. Beginning on July 10, 1967, he produced for Radio România the most popular music show of its day, Metronom. Together with Geo Limbășanu, he presented listeners with the latest information from the pop, rock and jazz scenes. Shortly after the August 21, 1968, Invasion of Czechoslovakia (in which Romania did not participate) he played a ballad by Mircea Florian which relates how five small wolves and a bigger one attacked a sheepfold, and later put on The Beatles' "Back in the U.S.S.R.". According to his nephew, "everything came to an end one evening" when he played the song, "which had escaped the censor, who didn't know English. But the song was heard on the show by the wrong people and was banned in 1969", also leading to Metronom's cancellation that year.

From adolescence he developed a passion for jazz, gathering all the information he could about jazz musicians and listening to jazz songs wherever he could. In his notebooks he copied books, chronicles, interviews and news from specialty magazines. His aunt later recalled, "In high school music was his only preoccupation. He wasted nights writing. In the morning he would wake up with great difficulty to go to school." Some of the notebooks ended up in the possessions of important Romanian musicians, such as Radu Maltopol, Cristian Colan, and Johnny Răducanu, being the only possible source for ready information about jazz at the time.

Founding members of the European Jazz Federation (October 15–16, 1967). Chiriac is second from left.

Chiriac wrote press articles as well as liner notes for the Jazz collection. In 1965, he published a study of jazz in the magazine Secolul XX; a year later, he wrote the preface for the Romanian edition of Louis Armstrong's My Life in New Orleans. He was a founding member of the European Jazz Federation in 1967. According to the minutes, he described the difficult conditions of Romanian jazz musicians at the time and accepted the idea of a federation under UNESCO protection. He said the federation should focus on creating a jazz academy, a bureau for international concerts and a centre where audio and TV recordings could be exchanged.

A great jazz aficionado, Chiriac would copy entire discs onto tapes and arrange them in the station archive. Aurel Gherghel later said, "The station's whole archive was written and arranged by Cornel Chiriac." In 1969, Chiriac organised and advertised the first national jazz festival in Romania, held in Ploiești. He also arranged for the songs played during the festival to be recorded.

As a producer, he especially backed the Timișoara band Phoenix and the Bucharest band Sideral. He completed important recordings with the former in Radio România's studio (1968–69) and promoted them on different occasions. In 1969, he took steps to bring them to the Golden Stag Festival, managing to include them in the lineup. Coincidentally, Cliff Richard, who eight years earlier had played in The Young Ones, a film that inspired many Romanian rock bands, was scheduled to sing there. Meanwhile, the Phoenix members were staying at Bucharest's Hotel Nord so the censors could watch them. During the festival, Chiriac returned from Brașov with the bad news that Phoenix' concert had been cancelled, but returned hoping to resolve the problem in extremis. Unable to convince the organisers, in protest, he locked himself in his hotel room and set fire to the curtains. The hotel employees and firemen broke down the door to stop the blaze, while Chiriac disappeared during the commotion, taking with him just the tapes with Phoenix.

== At Radio Free Europe ==
Cornel Chiriac in the RFE studio

A few days later, he managed to leave Romania and arrived in Austria with the help of a falsified invitation (received during the Brașov festival and having as its initial destination Poland). He spent some time at the Traiskirchen refugee camp, where he was discovered by Radio Free Europe director Noël Bernard. After getting his official documents in order, he continued his activity in Munich, in RFE's Romanian-language section. He re-launched Metronom and Jazz magazin, and started a third show, Jazz à la carte. At first, Chiriac used his microphone to express the anger he felt against those who had hindered his work at Radio România. Ioana Măgură Bernard later recalled: "Often, after doing something without thinking, Cornel had such problems with the German authorities and with the American heads of RFE that he was almost kicked out of Germany and off radio". Later, according to Noël Bernard, "he realised that not politics but music was his calling". Until his death, his musical activity was rich, and included a Romanian translation of the rock opera Jesus Christ Superstar.

On March 4, 1975, near midnight, Chiriac was stabbed near his car, in a Munich parking lot. An hour later, a female student returning home found him. The first suspect to be arrested was 17-year-old Mario Gropp, the last person seen with Chiriac that evening. In Romania, there was talk of a political assassination committed by the Securitate. Chiriac's body was cremated in Munich and his ashes brought back to Romania by his mother. He is buried in Bucharest's Reînvierea Cemetery.

== Legacy ==
Journalists later recalled that his murder was greeted with sadness in Bucharest. Alexandru Sipa organised a soirée at the Brașov jazz club, in memoriam. In Bucharest, Phoenix was in the Electrecord studio, recording the album Cantofabule. Octavian Ursulescu said in an interview, "The news that a good friend to all of us, Cornel Chiriac, had been assassinated, came to us in the Tomis studio; we all cried like children..."

On February 24, 1995, the Cornel Chiriac Jazz Club opened in Ploiești. A street in Pitești bears his name.
