= Scythian monks =

4th–6th-century European community of Christian monks

The Scythian monks were a community of monks from the region around the mouths of the Danube, who played an influential role in Christian theological disputes between the 4th and 6th centuries. The name Scythian comes from Scythia Minor, the classical name of the modern Dobruja region in Romania and Bulgaria, at the time a Roman province. The monks were raised not only from local Christian elements, but also from immigrant Christians who came to live ascetic lives.

== History ==
Scythia Minor was part of the Roman Empire since the 1st century, incorporating the local Christian elements into the religious life of the Roman, and later East Roman Empire. According to a tradition first recorded in the 3rd century AD, Saint Andrew, brother of Saint Peter, passed through the region in the 1st century with his disciples. However Christianity became widespread only in the 3rd and 4th centuries. Several remains of early Christian churches are found throughout the region, and ecclesiastic histories record martyrs in all the major urban centres.

Bishop Ephrem, killed on 7 March 304 in Tomis (modern Constanţa), was the first known Christian martyr of this region, persecution continuing under the emperors Diocletian, Galerius, Licinius and Julian the Apostate. A large number of dioceses and martyrs are first attested during the times of Ante-Nicene Fathers.

A major archaeological attestation of Christian martyrs came during the 1971 digs under the paleo-Christian basilica in Niculitel (near ancient Noviodunum), when a martyrium was discovered. Besides Zoticos, Attalos, Kamasis and Filippos, who suffered martyrdom under Diocletian (304–305), the relics of two previous martyrs, who witnessed and died during the repression of Emperor Decius (249–251), were unearthed under the crypt.

By the late 5th century, Tomis had become a metropolitan bishopric, with as many as 14 bishoprics attested in the 6th century.

== Influence ==
=== Theopaschite doctrine ===
The Scythian monks made a contribution to christology by advocating what has come to be known as the Theopaschite formula as a solution to controversies about the nature of Christ arising after the Council of Chalcedon. First formulated in 513, it was rejected by both the Eastern and Western branches of the Imperial church.

The problems between the adepts of different christologies arose with Pope Leo I's Tome (Latin text, a letter). This was a treatise written in 449 against the Monophysite leader Eutyches. The Council of Chalcedon supported Pope Leo I in 451, and the heresiarch Eutyches was condemned. In the Tome the two natures and one person of Christ were defined. One nature is brilliant with miracles, the other succumbs to injuries. This could be interpreted to mean that Christ had two independently acting aspects: a divine nature which performs miracles and a human nature which suffers. Pope Leo I proposed his Tome as a way of distinguishing Christ's natures, but it is believed that he did not intend to suggest that the natures were really separate parts. The Council of Chalcedon had attempted to settle the Nestorian and the Monophysite controversies by approving Pope Leo's Tome, confessing that Christ had two natures in one person. However, by endorsing Leo's Tome, the council appeared to endorse the Nestorian heresy, which held Jesus to be two distinct persons: closely and inseparably united, but still, distinct. This is what the Monophysites accused Chalcedon of doing.

One chapter of this debate, the "Theopaschite Controversy" of the 6th century, arose in the town of Tomis, on the western coast of the Black Sea. A strong community of monks living in the province of Scythia Minor became embroiled in this christological argument with the Archbishop from Tomis. The monks were fervent advocates of a christology which was both Chalcedonian (i.e. followed the christological teachings of the Council of Chalcedon), and Cyrillian. It also adopted the Augustinian doctrine of grace. This combination, they hoped, would unite the Western and Eastern Churches. They drew their own connection between christology and grace. They put forward a christology which drew heavily on Cyril of Alexandria (the formula of the oneness of Christ’s nature as the incarnation of God the Word), emphasizing the unity of Christ, while advocating the Augustinian doctrine of grace, emphasizing the role of grace and eliminating independent human effort from the performance of good works and salvation. The Scythian monks saw themselves as defenders of the Council of Chalcedon, asserting that the Tome should not be interpreted as it had been done by them. In support of their contention, the Scythian monks cited passages from Pope Leo's epistles which more clearly expressed the unity of Christ. However, because the Tome could be interpreted to divide Christ, the Scythian monks felt it necessary to find a way to exclude such a Nestorian misinterpretation. They did this in 513, by advocating what has come to be known as the Theopaschite formula: Unus ex Trinitate passus est (meaning "One of the Trinity suffered"). They did this wanting to exclude both Nestorianistic and Monophysitistic tendencies, and at the same time seeking to have the works of Faustus of Riez condemned as being tainted with Pelagianism. Their views caused controversy to erupt in Constantinople. The monks felt that if one confesses their statement along with the deliberation of the Council of Chalcedon, then the Orthodox interpretation of the council is preserved, as the Theopaschite formula makes it clear that Logos (the unifying principle linking God and man) is the acting subject not only for the miracles of Christ, but also for his suffering.

The monks initially won the support of Vitalian, an East Roman general who was the magister militum of Thrace and the leader of a powerful pro-Chalcedonian rebellion against Emperor Anastasius I, who was a convinced Monophysite. Vitalian was a native of Scythia Minor and one of the Scythian monks was a relative of his. The rebellion started in 512, when a nearly identical formula to that of the Scythian monks, added to the Trisagion in the liturgy of Hagia Sophia, was removed by Emperor Anastasius I. The rebellion continued until 515, when Vitalian was defeated and forced to go into hiding. By the reign of Anastasius' successor, Justin I, orthodoxy extended even to the army: soldiers were ordered to subscribe to the creed of Chalcedon or be deprived of their rations. At the beginning of the year 519, a delegation of Scythian monks traveled to Constantinople under the leadership of John Maxentius to bring their case before Emperor Justin I, proposing a new solution by arguing in favor of their formula. They were fiercely opposed by legates from Rome under Germanus of Capua and by the Sleepless Monks (so-called for their around-the-clock prayer in eight-hour shifts) ironically, in trying to combat the Eutychian tendencies of the Scythian monks, the Sleepless Monks themselves shifted into Nestorianism, and were excommunicated by Pope John II for this). Faced with this opposition, the Scythian monks' view was that although the Chalcedonian definition (strongly supported by Rome) was indeed an orthodox expression of the faith, it was susceptible to a Nestorian misinterpretation which would in effect split Christ into two persons despite the verbal acknowledgment that Christ has only one person. The Scythian monks' proposal was not well received, mainly because of the timing: the monks arrived in Constantinople just as the emperor Justin I was negotiating an end to the Acacian schism. This split between Rome and Constantinople originated in 484 when Pope Felix III excommunicated Acacius, the Patriarch of Constantinople, for attempting to evade the council of Chalcedon in his attempt to bring the Monophysites back under control. Acacius had advised Emperor Zeno to issue a statement, the Henotikon (the "act of union"; 482), which was an attempt to reconcile the differences between the supporters of Orthodoxy and of Monophysitism. But the Henotikon failed to insist upon Chalcedon as the standard of orthodoxy, and the Council of Chalcedon, because of its endorsement of the Tome of Pope Leo I, had become a mark of the prestige of the Roman See. Acacius's apparent attempt to ignore Chalcedon was seen as an insult against Rome's claim to be the gold standard of orthodoxy. By the time the monks arrived in Constantinople, the political landscape changed and Emperor Justin's policies were directed more to the west than to the east where the Monophysites were dominant. This policy led him, in 519, to accede to Rome's demand that Chalcedon be the official christological confession of the empire. He received the emissaries from Rome in triumphal procession, and Patriarch John of Constantinople signed documents ending the thirty-five-year-old schism. Thus, when the Scythian monks arrived on the scene urging that the resolutions of Chalcedon needed to be supplemented with their Theopaschite formula, no one was willing to listen. The Scythian monks' views were interpreted as an attack on the Council of Chalcedon and thus a threat to the newly established reunion between Rome and Constantinople. A bishop from North Africa named Possessor, who was in Constantinople at the same time as the Scythian monks, also opposed their christological position by citing Faustus of Riez, whom the Scythian monks accused of the Pelagian heresy.

Failing to gain acceptance in Constantinople, some of the monks, led by John Maxentius, proceeded to Rome in 519, in hopes of winning Pope Hormisdas' support. Despite an initial warm reception and supportive letters from Justinian, who had by then started to change his mind about the monks' formula, they were unable to win over the pope, as he was reluctant to offer his support to a group of monks who had openly opposed his legates in Constantinople. By 520, the pope failed to give his judgment on their position. The monks were indignant due to this lack of response. Despite their loud protests, they did not receive a new audience with the pope. Finally, after fourteen months, the monks left Rome. Shortly after 13 August 520, their behavior in Rome prompted Pope Hormisdas to write a letter to the same Possessor in Constantinople, criticizing their theology and severely condemning their vociferous objections. When presented with this letter from the Pope, Maxentius responded that the pope could not possibly have written it because whoever wrote it was clearly a heretic. One historian has suggested that after this episode, Maxentius retreated to the religious community living at Tintagel in Sub-Roman Britain, and that his name is mentioned in the Latin inscription on the Artognou stone. In the end, the Scythian monks found support first from one quarter: they wrote a letter to the bishops of North Africa who at that time were exiled by the Vandals to the island of Sardinia. The leader of the north-African bishops, Fulgentius of Ruspe composed a reply by which they accepted the christological formula as well as the monks' Augustinian doctrine of grace. Meanwhile, at Constantinople, Emperor Justin I had died, and his nephew Justinian, a theologian in his own right, became the new emperor in 527. He also began to support the monks' position, being convinced that the monks' statement was orthodox and perceiving that it could make Chalcedon more acceptable to Monophysites in the East. In 531, the monks took part in public debates arranged by Emperor Justinian (527-565) between Chalcedonians and the Miaphysite followers of Severus of Antioch.

=== Other legacies ===
The Roman philosopher and mathematician Boethius wrote five opuscula sacra to analyse points of Christian doctrine. The fifth treatise, against Eutyches and Nestorius, was initially occasioned by the Eastern letter of 512 (some years before the arrival of Scythian monks in Rome in 519/520), but has some similarities with the ideas of John Maxentius and the Scythian monks. Boethius, like John Maxentius, identifies the problem of the Eutychians and Nestorians as being their failure to distinguish nature and person (ch. 1–2). Boethius also refers to God's suffering in the crucifixion (in ch. 7.54–55), which parallels the Scythian formula "One of the Holy Trinity suffered for us." However, Boethius' terminology and arguments appear to be generally unrelated to those of the Scythian monks. Boethius's writing has an interest far beyond their contributions to the doctrinal debate, being one of the most influential theological books in European culture.

John Cassian was an earlier monk from Scythia who died in 435. He studied with the monks in Egypt (the "Desert Fathers"). He left Egypt and established a monastery in Marseille in Southern Gaul. He wrote the Institutes and Conferences describing the monastic life in Egypt and was an important figure in the spread of monasticism in the West. Cassian, together with Athanasius of Alexandria and John Chrysostom, emphasized the idea of an ascent to God through periods of purgation and illumination that led to unity with the Divine. This ideology of the so-called "Desert Fathers" deeply affected the spirituality of the Western Church. For this reason, the writings and spirituality of the desert fathers are still of interest to many people today.

=== Anno Domini ===
At Rome, Pope Gelasius had appointed Dionysius Exiguus, a member of the Roman monks community whom he knew from Constantinople, to translate documents in the papal archive. Later, Dionysius worked under the new Pope John I, translating from Greek into Latin the Easter tables drawn up by Saint Theophilus, of the Church of Alexandria, and his successor Saint Cyril. Although the tables originally counted its years in the Anno Diocletiani era, from the beginning of the reign of the pagan Roman Emperor Diocletian, Dionysius replaced it with his anno Domini era because he did not wish to continue the memory of a tyrant who persecuted Christians. Thus, he introduced the method of reckoning the Christian era from the birth of Christ. Cassiodorus praises in his Institutiones, the talents and the work of Dionysius Exiguus, and this indicates that he was personally acquainted with the rest of the "Scythian monks".

== Notable members ==
- John Maxentius
- Dionysius Exiguus
- John Cassian
- Leontius Byzantinus

== See also ==
- Chalcedonianism
- Eastern Christian monasticism
- Eastern Orthodox theology
- History of Christianity in Romania
- Hypostatic Union
- Neo-Chalcedonism
- Trifolius presbyter

== Sources ==
- Otto Bardenhewer: "Patrology"; St. Louis, 1908.
- Patrick T. R. Gray: "The Defense of Chalcedon in the East". Studies in the History of Christian Thought, ed. Heiko A. Oberman, v. 20 (Leiden, 1979).
- Grillmeier, Aloys (1987). Christ in Christian Tradition: Reception and Contradiction: The Development of the Discussion about Chalcedon from 451 to the Beginning of the reign of Justinian. Vol. 2/1. Atlanta: John Knox Press. ISBN 9780664221607.
- Grillmeier, Aloys; Hainthaler, Theresia (1995). Christ in Christian Tradition: The Church of Constantinople in the Sixth Century. Vol. 2/2. Louisville: Westminster John Knox Press. ISBN 9780664219970.
- Karl Krumbacher: "Geschichte der byzantinischen Litteratur"; (Munich, 1897).
- John Maxentius: "Libellus Fidei"; Ed. François Glorie. Corpus Christianorum Series Latina 85A (Turnholt, 1978).
- Edward Schwartz: "Acta Conciliorum Oecumenicorum"; Tome 4, vol. 2, Concilium Univerale Constantinopolitanum Sub Iustiniano Habitum. Trübner, 1934, i–xxxii.
