= Joannes Maxentius =

John Maxentius (Latin: Ioannes Maxentius; Greek: Ἰωάννης Μαξέντιος) was the Byzantine leader of the so-called Scythian monks, a christological minority.

== Biography ==
He appears in history at Constantinople in 519 and 520. The Scythian monks adapted the formula: "One of the Trinity suffered in the flesh" to exclude Nestorianism and Monophysitism, and they sought to have the works of Faustus of Riez condemned as being tainted with Pelagianism. On both these points they met with opposition. John Maxentius presented an appeal to the papal legates then at Constantinople.

When it failed to bring forth a favourable decision, some of the monks (not Maxentius, however) proceeded to Rome to lay the case before Pope Hormisdas. As the latter delayed his decision, they addressed themselves to some African bishops banished to Sardinia, and St. Fulgentius, answering in the name of these prelates, warmly endorsed their cause. Early in August, 520, the monks left Rome.

On 13 August, 520, Hormisdas addressed a letter to an African bishop, Possessor, then at Constantinople, in which he severely condemned the conduct of the Scythian monks, also declaring that the writings of Faustus were not received among the authoritative works of the Church Fathers and that the sound doctrine on grace was contained in the works of St. Augustine (Hormisdae ep., cxxiv in Thiel, p. 926). Maxentius assailed this letter in the strongest language as a document written by heretics and circulated under the pope's name. This is the last trace of the Scythian monks and their leader in history.

The identification of John Maxentius with the priest John to whom Fulgentius addressed his "De veritate praedestinationis etc" and with the priest and archimandrite John, to whom the African bishops sent their "Epistula synodica", rests on a baseless assumption.

== Works ==
Maxentius is also the author of

- two dialogues against the Nestorians
- twelve anathematisms against the Nestorians
- a treatise against the Acephali (Monophysites).

The "Professio de Christo", printed as a separate work, is but a part of the "Epistola ad legatos sedis apostolicae".

His works, originally written in Latin, were preserved in a rather unsatisfactory condition. They were first published by Cochlaeus in 1520.

== Notes ==
Attribution
