= Iosif Trifa =

Romanian Orthodox priest (1888–1938)

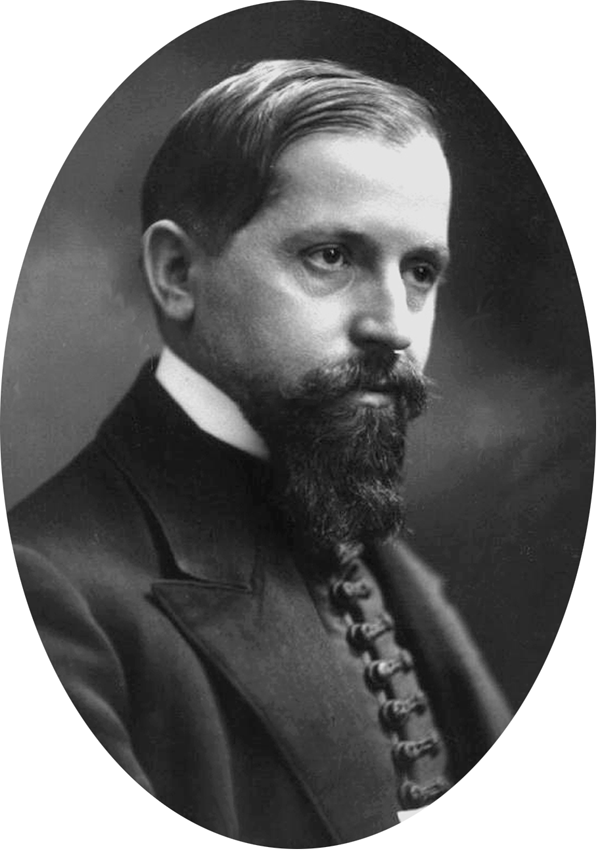
Iosif Trifa

Iosif Trifa (3 March 1888 – 12 February 1938) was a Romanian Orthodox priest and evangelist. He founded "Oastea Domnului" ("The Lord's Army"). He was also the uncle of Valerian Trifa. Trifa placed on the 100 greatest Romanians list.

== Life ==
Iosif Trifa was born in the family of Dimitrie and Ana Trifa, from the village Certege, Torda-Aranyos County (now Câmpeni, Alba County, Romania). He was the 4th son of a total of 6. He was baptised on 6 March 1888.

When he was 7 years old, in 1895, he started elementary school in his village, and in 1900 started gymnasium in Beiuș. Later on, he studied theology in Sibiu. In 1910 he was named a confessional teacher in the town of Vidra de Sus, which is now the town of Avram Iancu, Alba, named after the Transylvanian Romanian national hero.

In 1911 he married Iuliana Iancu, niece to the hero Avram Iancu. In the same year he was made priest in Vidra. In 1912 his first child, a girl, Olimpia, was born, but she died the following year. In 1914 his second child, a boy this time, Titus Gheorghe, was born, but he also died the following year. In 1916 Romania entered World War I on the side of the Allies, in an effort to wrangle Transylvania from Austro-Hungarian rule. In 1916, Trifa's third child was born: a boy, whom he named the same as his second, Titus-Gheorghe; this child is the only one who survived. In 1918, his fourth child, a girl, Augustina, was born. World War I ended, but the Spanish flu endemic killed both his wife Iuliana, and his daughter Augustina. He was left only with his son, Tit, who at the time was three years old.

He was excommunicated by the Romanian Orthodox Church in 1936. This decision would be lifted on 28 September 1990.

He died in 1938 in Sibiu after heart surgery, and was buried in the city's cemetery.
