= Noël Bernard (journalist) =

Romanian Journalist

Noël Bernard (born Noel Bercovici; 25 February 1925 – 23 December 1981) was a Romanian journalist, known for being the head of the Romanian-language department of Radio Free Europe (RFE). His mysterious death is believed by some to have been caused by Communist Romania's secret police, the Securitate, which is known to have previously sought to "neutralise" him.

== Biography ==
Born in Bucharest, to a Jewish father, Filip Bercovici, and a German Catholic mother, Elisabeth née Jahn, Noël Bernard left Romania together with his parents and moved to Mandatory Palestine in 1940. There he studied mathematics at the Hebrew University of Jerusalem where he met his first wife, fellow student Yvette Bourla. He then moved to London, where he changed his surname to Bernard and became a journalist at the BBC, working in the organisation's Romanian service.

Bernard started working as the chief of the Romanian language department of the West German-based Radio Free Europe in 1953, but he left in 1958 and moved to Rome with his wife and two children. After reporting from Rome, he and his family returned to England, where Bernard ran the London office of Radio Press International (RPI), a radio news service that was ultimately bought out by UPI. Eight years after leaving Munich, Bernard returned to serve as director of RFE's Romanian-language department until his death in 1981. In 1972, he married Ioana Măgură. A former newsreader for the Romanian Radio and Television (1964–1969), she had defected from Communist Romania in 1969, and had started working for RFE in Munich.

Under his leadership, the Romanian-language department of Radio Free Europe became the most popular of all the language-specific departments of RFE. After the 1977 Bucharest earthquake, Bernard obtained permission from the radio board to transmit around-the-clock information in Romanian. According to Arch Puddington in Broadcasting Freedom. The Cold War Triumph of Radio Free Europe and Radio Liberty, under Bernard's leadership "the Romanian section carried out a relentless polemical offensive against Ceaușescu [...] The tone was biting, personal and sarcastic. During Bernard's editorship, the Romanian section was not infrequently cited for violation of the station's strictures against vituperation and rhetorical excess."

The Securitate tried to start disputes within the Romanian-language department of RFE and to create a hostile environment against Bernard, to remove him from the head of the radio station.

Ion Mihai Pacepa, the Romanian intelligence general who defected to the United States, claimed that he decided to defect after Communist President Nicolae Ceaușescu ordered him to assassinate Bernard. In his book, Red Horizons, Pacepa claimed that Bernard was Ceaușescu's bête noire because of his strong criticism of Ceaușescu's personality cult.

Bernard died of cancer. His wife, Ioana Măgură-Bernard, moved to California, to join her daughter and grandchildren. In various statements for the Romanian press, she suggests that her late husband was irradiated by the Securitate, which had previously infiltrated the RFE's structure. She also linked Bernard's death to those of RFE journalists such as Cornel Chiriac (who was stabbed to death in mysterious circumstances), Emil Georgescu and Vlad Georgescu (both of whom, like Bernard and others in quick succession, died of cancer). This hypothesis appears to be supported by his Securitate file, which has attached an article from a magazine which talks about him undergoing surgery and has a note which argues that the article confirms "the measures undertaken by us are starting to have an effect". (See also: Radu (weapon).)
