= Army of the Lord =

Evangelical church movement

- Oastea Domnului
- Type: Eastern Christian
- Classification: Eastern Orthodox
- Orientation: Evangelical, Church renewal
- Scripture: Septuagint, New Testament
- Theology: Eastern Orthodox theology with influences of Neo-Protestant Pietism and New Evangelicals
- Polity: Episcopal
- Primate: Daniel, Patriarch of All Romania
- Region: Romania
- Language: Romanian
- Liturgy: Byzantine Rite
- Founder: Iosif Trifa
- Origin: 1926; Sibiu
- Recognition: 28 September 1990
- Branched from: Romanian Orthodox Church
- Other name: The Lord's Army
- Official website: oasteadomnului.ro

The Army of the Lord (Romanian: Oastea Domnului), also known as The Lord's Army, is an evangelical "renewal movement within the Romanian Orthodox Church". The founder of the Army of the Lord, Father Iosif Trifa, as well as consequent leaders, Ioan Marini and Traian Dorz, felt that "people needed to come to the Gospel and that the Eastern Orthodox Church in Romania needed to return to her true mission: to serve God and to represent God in the midst of our nation". Tom Keppeler writes that "what Wesley was to the Anglican Church, Trifa was to the Romanian Orthodox Church. As Wesley's preaching and ministry drew crowds from the working classes, so Trifa's as well was a ministry that grew among the villagers and workers of the fields". In the 1930s and 1940s, "millions of Romanian Orthodox, including priests and religious, took part in its activities of evangelization, printing and open air meetings". Members of the Army of the Lord greet one another with the phrase: "Praise the Lord!", followed by the reply: "Forever, amen!"

== Basic Pietism and key Evangelism ==
In his foundational book <<What is Lord's Army>>, he outlined the purpose and strategy of the movement.

=== 4 Basic Pietism ===
1. Christocentrism
2. Sign of the cross
3. Receiving the Holy Body and Blood of Christ, abstinence from alcohol (The danger of alcohol consumption, which curses not only individuals, but whole nations)
4. Oblation, Church volunteer work or voluntariness

=== 5 Key Evangelism ===
1. Discipleship, which is the best sermon
2. Acts of mercy
3. Love and prayer
4. Forgiveness and justice
5. Distribution of Christian literature

== Persecution under Communism ==
After 1948, the movement was declared illegal by the Communist regime. During this period, the "Lord's Army", led by Traian Dorz in the difficult years of Stalin, who had spent 17 years in jail for this reason, was part of the "silent church", an informal ensemble of Christian believers from various denominations, which refused to obey the Communist authorities, being for this reason considered as "printing and spreading forbidden literature", "plotting against social ordering" and "enemies of the people."

== See also ==
- Anti-religious campaign of Communist Romania
- Eastern Protestantism
- The Salvation Army (Neoprotestant movement)
