= Catholic Church =

Christian church based in Rome

Catholic Church
- Ecclesia Catholica
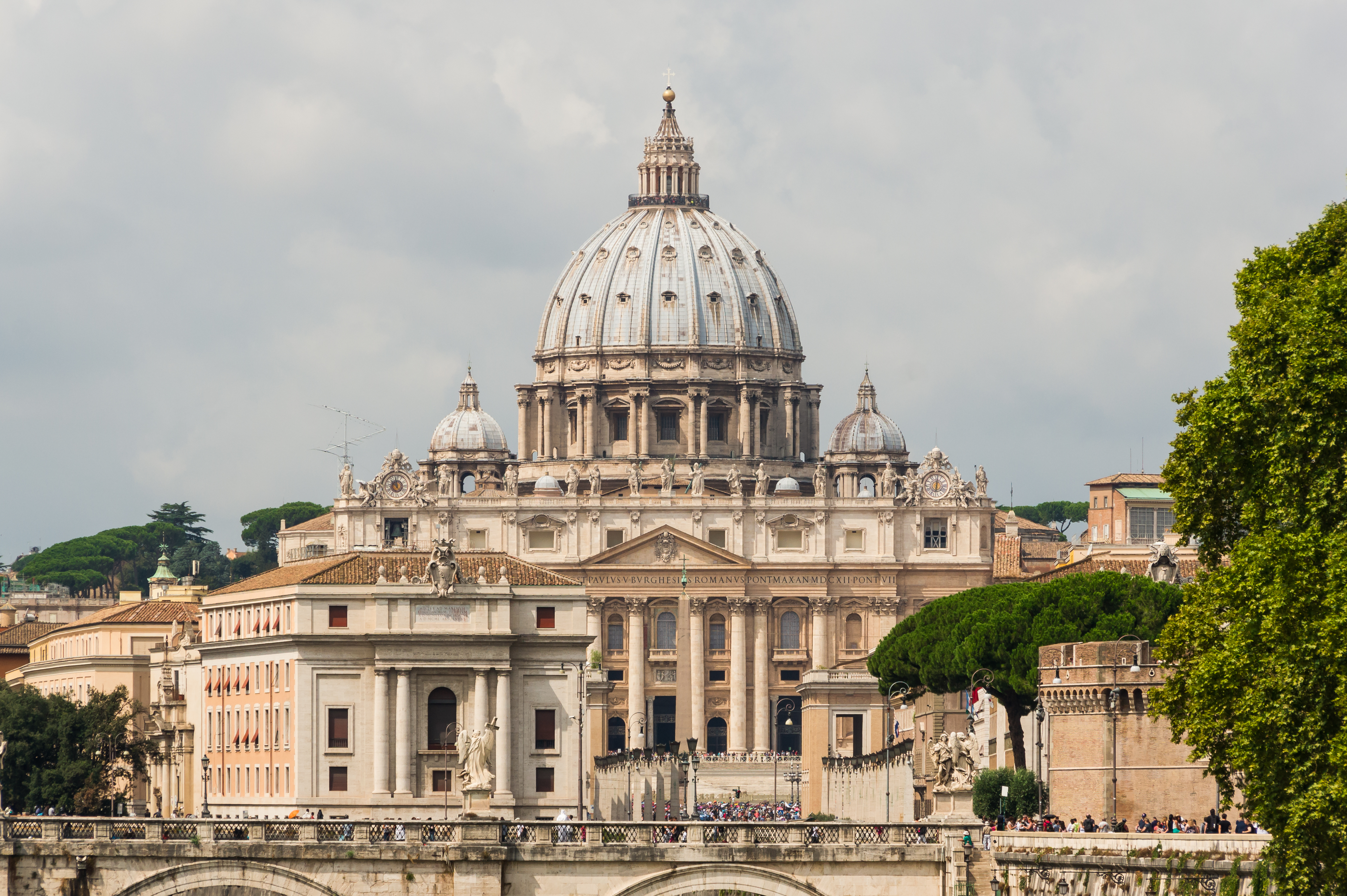
- St. Peter's Basilica in Vatican City, the largest Catholic church building in the world
- Classification: Catholic
- Scripture: Catholic Bible
- Theology: Catholic theology
- Polity: Episcopal
- Governance: Holy See and Roman Curia
- Pope: Leo XIV
- Particular churches sui iuris: 24
- Dioceses: Archdioceses: 640; Dioceses: 2,851
- Parishes: 221,700 approx.
- Region: Worldwide
- Language: Ecclesiastical Latin and native languages
- Liturgy: Latin and Eastern
- Headquarters: Vatican City
- Founder: Jesus Christ, according to; sacred tradition
- Origin: 1st century Roman Empire
- Separations: Protestantism; Old Catholicism; Independent Catholicism (List); Sedevacantism
- Members: 1.279 billion according to World Christian Database (2026); 1.406 billion according to the Annuario Pontificio (2023)
- Clergy: Bishops: 5,430; Priests: 406,996; Deacons: 51,433; (2023)
- Hospitals: 18,000 clinics; 5,500 hospitals
- Nursing homes: 16,000
- Primary schools: 95,200
- Secondary schools: 43,800
- Official website: vatican.va

The Catholic Church (Latin: Ecclesia Catholica), also called the Roman Catholic Church (Latin: Ecclesia Catholica Romana), (Note: This term may either refer to the entire church, including both the Latin Church and the Eastern Catholic Churches, or to the Latin Church specifically.) is the largest Christian denomination, with an estimated 1.28 to 1.41 billion baptized members worldwide as of 2026. It consists of 24 autonomous (sui iuris) churches. The largest of these churches is the Latin Church. In addition to it, there are 23 smaller Eastern Catholic Churches. Together, the Latin Church and the Eastern Catholic churches are organized into nearly 3,500 dioceses and eparchies governed by bishops. Throughout history, the church has had a large role in the development of Western civilization. Catholic communities are present worldwide through missions, immigration, and conversions. The majority of Catholics live in the Global South, reflecting rapid demographic growth in Africa, Asia, and Latin America, as well as secularization in parts of Europe and North America.

Catholic doctrine is rooted in the Nicene Creed and holds that the church is the "one, holy, catholic and apostolic Church" founded by Jesus Christ. (Note: While the Catholic Church considers itself to be the authentic continuation of the Christian community founded by Jesus Christ, it teaches that other Christian churches and communities can be in an imperfect communion with the Catholic Church.) It teaches that bishops are the successors of the apostles and that the pope—the bishop of Rome—is the successor of Saint Peter the Apostle, entrusted with a unique and primary pastoral role. Leo XIV is the current pope, serving as the head of the church; the Diocese of Rome forms his local jurisdiction, while the Holy See serves as the church's central governing authority through the Roman Curia. Apostolic teaching is understood to be transmitted through Scripture and sacred tradition, interpreted by the magisterium, the church's teaching authority. Catholic liturgical life includes the Roman Rite, other rites of the Latin Church, and the liturgical traditions of the Eastern Catholic Churches. Religious orders, monastic communities, and lay movements contribute to a wide range of theological and devotional expressions within Catholicism globally.

Among the church's seven sacraments, the Eucharist is seen as the source and summit of the Christian life and is celebrated in the Mass. Catholics believe that through consecration by a priest, the bread and wine become the body and blood of Christ. The Virgin Mary is venerated as the Mother of God and honored through dogmas such as the Immaculate Conception, perpetual virginity, and the Assumption, as well as devotional practices. Catholic social teaching emphasizes care for the poor, the sick, and the marginalized. The church operates tens of thousands of educational, medical, and charitable institutions worldwide, making it the largest non-governmental provider of education and health care.

Its relations with other Christian traditions have been shaped by divisions. The separation between the church and Eastern Orthodox churches within the state Roman church developed gradually and was solidified by the Fourth Crusade, amid theological and political disputes, especially over papal authority. Earlier schisms occurred with the Church of the East after the Council of Ephesus (431) and with the Oriental Orthodox Churches following the Council of Chalcedon (451). The 16th-century Protestant Reformation led to new Christian traditions and prompted the Catholic Counter‑Reformation. Since the late 20th century, the church has faced criticism of its teachings on sexuality, clerical celibacy, the ordination of women, and its handling of clerical sexual abuse.

== Name ==
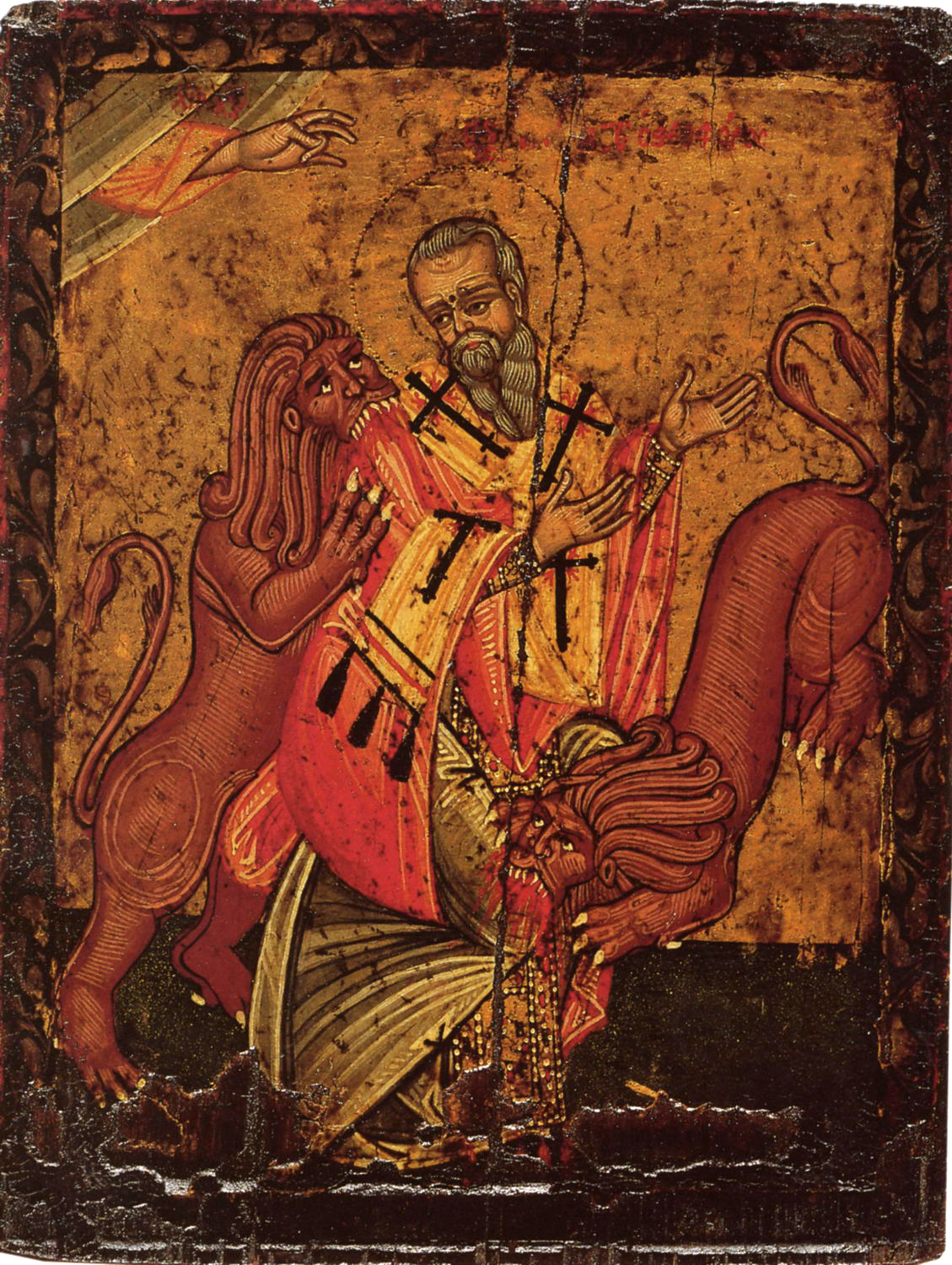
The first use of the term "Catholic Church", meaning "universal church", was by the Church Father Saint Ignatius of Antioch in his Letter to the Smyrnaeans in c. 110 AD. Ignatius of Antioch also is credited with the first recorded use of the term Christianity ten years earlier, in c. 100 AD. He died in Rome, with his relics located in San Clemente al Laterano.

Catholic (from Greek: καθολικός, romanized: katholikos, lit. 'universal') is first attested as an adjective used to describe the church in the early second century. (Note: MacCulloch, Diarmaid (2010). Christianity: The First Three Thousand Years. Viking Press (imprint of Penguin Books). Originally published 2009 by Allen Lane, as A History of Christianity. ISBN 978-0-670-02126-0. p. 127.) The first known use of the phrase "the catholic church" (Greek: καθολικὴ ἐκκλησία, romanized: katholikḕ ekklēsía) appears in a letter written around AD 100 by Ignatius of Antioch to the Smyrnaeans, (Note: Quote of St Ignatius to the Smyrnaeans (c. 110 AD)) which reads: "Wheresoever the bishop shall appear, there let the people be, even as where Jesus may be, there is the universal [katholike] Church." In the Catechetical Lectures (c. 350) of Cyril of Jerusalem, the name "Catholic Church" was used to distinguish it from other groups that also called themselves "the church". The "Catholic" notion was further emphasized in the edict De fide catolica, issued in 380 by Theodosius I, the last emperor to rule over both the eastern and western halves of the Roman Empire, when he established the state church of the Roman Empire.

Since the East–West Schism of 1054, the Eastern Orthodox Church has taken the adjective "Orthodox" as its distinctive epithet; its official name continues to be the "Orthodox Catholic Church." The Latin Church was described as "Catholic", with that description also denoting those in communion with the Holy See after the Protestant Reformation of the 16th century, when those who ceased to be in communion became known as Protestants.

While the "Roman Church" has been used to describe the pope's Diocese of Rome since the Fall of the Western Roman Empire and into the Early Middle Ages (6th–10th century), "Roman Catholic Church" has been applied to the whole church in the English language since the Protestant Reformation in the late 16th century. Further, some refer to the Latin Church as "Roman Catholic" in distinction from the Eastern Catholic churches. "Roman Catholic" has occasionally appeared in documents produced by the Holy See, (Note: Example uses of "Roman Catholic" by the Holy See: the encyclicals Divini illius Magistri "link". Archived from the original on 23 September 2010. of Pope Pius XI and Humani generis "link". Archived from the original on 19 April 2012. of Pope Pius XII; joint declarations signed by Pope Benedict XVI with Archbishop of Canterbury Rowan Williams on 23 November 2006 and Patriarch Bartholomew I of Constantinople on 30 November 2006.) and has been used by certain national episcopal conferences and local dioceses. (Note: Example use of "Roman" Catholic by a bishop's conference: The Baltimore Catechism, an official catechism authorized by the Catholic bishops of the United States, states: "That is why we are called Roman Catholics; to show that we are united to the real successor of St Peter" (Question 118) and refers to the church as the "Roman Catholic Church" under Questions 114 and 131 (Baltimore Catechism).)

The name "Catholic Church" for the whole church is used in the Catechism of the Catholic Church (1990) and the Code of Canon Law (1983). "Catholic Church" is also used in the documents of the Second Vatican Council (1962–1965), the First Vatican Council (1869–1870), the Council of Trent (1545–1563) and numerous other official documents. The Free Dictionary by Farlex suggests that the abbreviation "RCC" has some informal use to indicate the Roman Catholic Church.

== History ==
=== Apostolic era and papacy ===
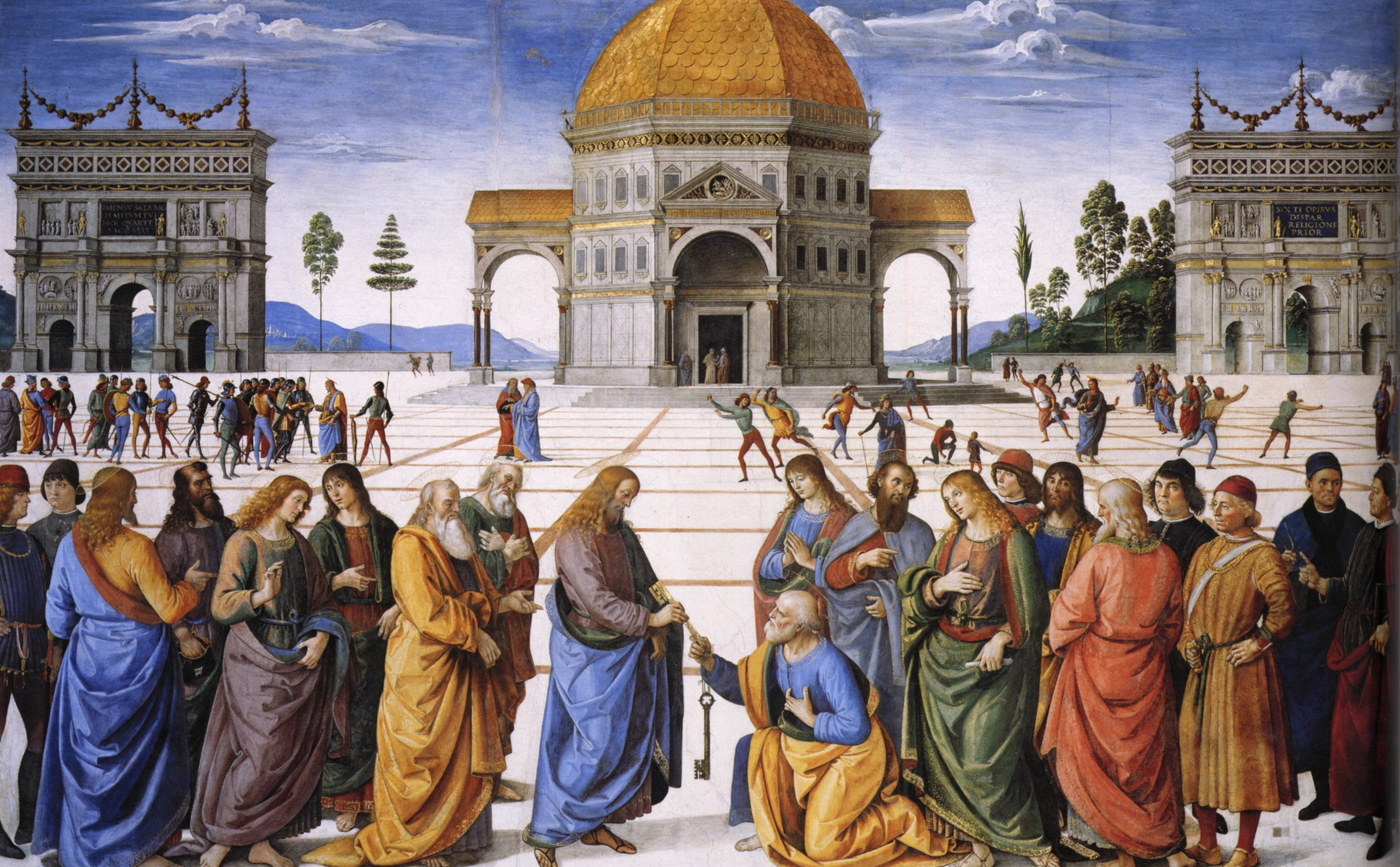
A c. 1481–1482 fresco by Pietro Perugino in the Sistine Chapel showing Jesus giving the keys of Heaven to Saint Peter

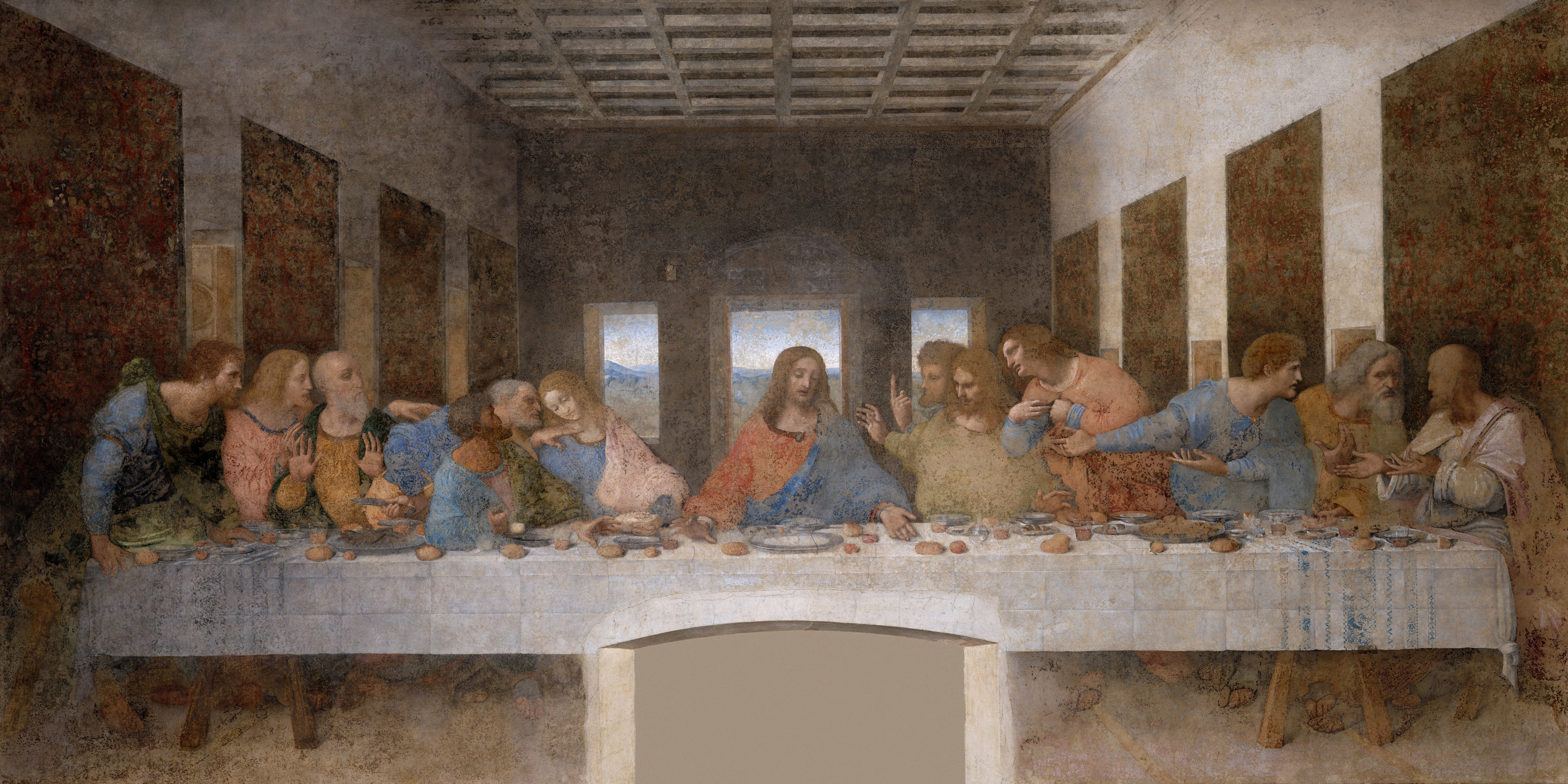
The Last Supper in the Santa Maria delle Grazie Church in Milan, Italy, a late 1490s mural painting by Leonardo da Vinci, depicting the Last Supper of Jesus and his twelve apostles, depicts the final meal of Jesus before his crucifixion and death.

The New Testament, particularly the Gospels, records Jesus' activities and teaching, his appointment of the Twelve Apostles, and his Great Commission to them, instructing them to continue his work. The Acts of the Apostles recounts the founding of the Christian Church and the spread of its message throughout the Roman Empire. The Catholic Church teaches that its public ministry began on Pentecost, which occurred fifty days after the date on which Christ is believed to have risen from the dead. At Pentecost, the apostles are held to have received the Holy Spirit, preparing them for their mission of leading the church. The Catholic Church further teaches that the college of bishops, led by the bishop of Rome, is the successor to the apostles.

In the account of the Confession of Peter found in the Gospel of Matthew, Christ designates Peter as the "rock" upon which his Church will be built. The Catholic Church considers the bishop of Rome, the pope, to be the successor of Saint Peter. Some scholars hold that Peter was the first bishop of Rome, while other scholars argue that the institution of the papacy does not depend on the view that Peter was bishop of Rome, or even on the claim that he ever resided in Rome.

Many scholars maintain that a church structure consisting of multiple presbyters/bishops persisted in Rome until the mid-2nd century, when a structure with a single bishop and multiple presbyters was adopted, and that later writers retrospectively applied the title "bishop of Rome" to the most prominent members of the clergy in the earlier period, as well as to Peter himself. On this basis, Bart D. Ehrman argues that Peter "could not have been the first bishop of Rome", while also noting that the church "did not have anyone as its bishop until about a hundred years after Peter's death." Raymond E. Brown likewise states that it is anachronistic to speak of Peter in terms of a local bishop of Rome, but that Christians of that period would have regarded Peter as exercising roles that contributed "to the development of the role of the papacy in the subsequent church." These roles, Brown argues, "contributed enormously to seeing the bishop of Rome ... as the successor of Peter ... for the church universal."

=== Antiquity and Roman Empire ===
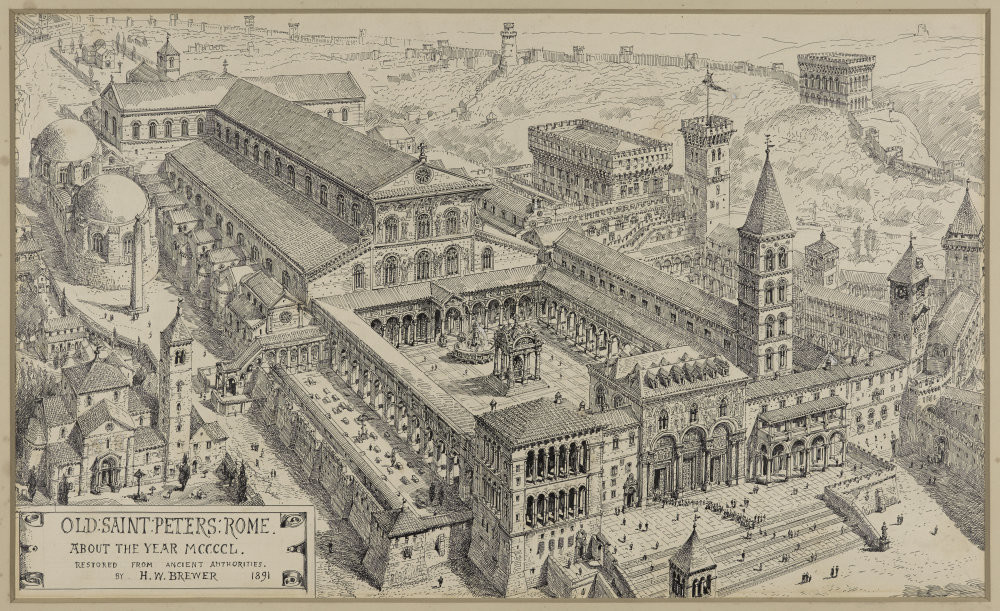
A 19th-century illustration by Henry William Brewer of Old St. Peter's Basilica, built in 318 by Constantine the Great

The Roman Empire facilitated the spread of new ideas through its extensive network of roads and waterways, the relative security of the Pax Romana, and the promotion of a common culture with strong Greek influences, all of which allowed ideas to be more easily expressed and understood. However, unlike most religions in the Roman Empire, Christianity required its followers to renounce all other gods, a practice inherited from Judaism. Because Christians refused to participate in pagan festivals and civic rituals, they were excluded from many aspects of public life, leading some non-Christians, including government authorities, to fear that they were angering the gods and thereby threatening the peace and prosperity of the empire. The resulting prosecutions became a defining element of early Christian self-understanding until Christianity was legalized in the 4th century.

In 313, Constantine the Great—the first Roman emperor to convert to Christianity—issued the Edict of Milan, which legalized the Christian faith, and he moved the imperial capital to Constantinople (modern Istanbul, Turkey) in 330. In 380, the Edict of Thessalonica made Nicene Christianity the state church of the Roman Empire, a status that continued within the shrinking territory of the Byzantine Empire until its fall in 1453. Elsewhere, the church functioned independently of imperial authority, becoming especially evident after the East-West Schism. During the period of the Seven Ecumenical Councils, five principal sees emerged—Rome, Constantinople, Alexandria, Antioch, and Jerusalem—formalized in the mid-6th century, arranged by Justinian I, the Byzantine emperor from 527 to 565, as the pentarchy.

In 451, the Council of Chalcedon, in a canon of disputed validity, elevated the See of Constantinople to a role "second in eminence and power to the bishop of Rome." From c. 350 – c. 500, the bishops, or popes, of Rome steadily increased their authority through consistently intervening in helping orthodox leaders during theological disputes, which encouraged appeals to them. Emperor Justinian, under his controlled territories, established a form of caesaropapism where he could regulate "the minutest details of worship and discipline" and "theologian opinions" in the church—establishing imperial influence over Rome and other Western territories again. This act created the Byzantine Papacy period (537–752) in which popes required approval from the emperor or his representative for consecration, leading to most being selected by the emperor from his Greek-speaking subjects, which created a "melting pot" of Western and Eastern Christian traditions in art and liturgy.

In the following centuries, Germanic tribes who invaded the Roman Empire adopted Christianity in its Arian form, which the Council of Nicaea declared heretical, causing discord between Germanic rulers and Catholic subjects. (Note: Jacques Le Goff (3 November 1988) [1964]. La civilisation de l'Occident médiéval [Medieval Civilization 400–1500] (PDF). Translated by Julia Barrow. Wiley-Blackwell (previously Basil Blackwell). ISBN 978-0-631-15512-6. Archived from the original (PDF) on 10 April 2026. p. 14. "The face of the barbarian invaders had been transformed by another crucial fact. Although some of them had remained pagan, another part of them, not the least, had become Christian. But, by a curious chance, which was to leave serious consequences, these converted barbarians—the Ostrogoths, Visigoths, Burgundians, Vandals, and later the Lombards—had been converted to Arianism, which had become a heresy after the council of Nicaea. They had in fact been converted by followers of the 'apostle of the Goths', Ulfilas[Wulfila].") In 497, Clovis I, the Frankish ruler, converted to orthodox Catholicism and he aligned himself with the papacy and the monastic communities—an act that unified Germanic rulers and Catholic subjects for the most part. Following his lead, the Visigoths converted to Catholicism in 589, and the Lombards in Italy gradually adopted it during the 7th century.

Western Christianity—particularly through its monastic institutions—played a massive role in preserving classical civilization, including its artistic traditions and literacy. Benedict of Nursia (c. 480–543), one of the founders of Western monasticism, with his Rule, exerted a crucial influence on European culture with his appropriation of the church's monastic spiritual heritage and his preservation and transmission of ancient culture with the spread of the Benedictine tradition. During this time, monastic Ireland became a center of scholarship; early Irish missionaries such as Columbanus and Columba spread Christianity and established monasteries across continental Europe.

=== Middle Ages and Renaissance ===
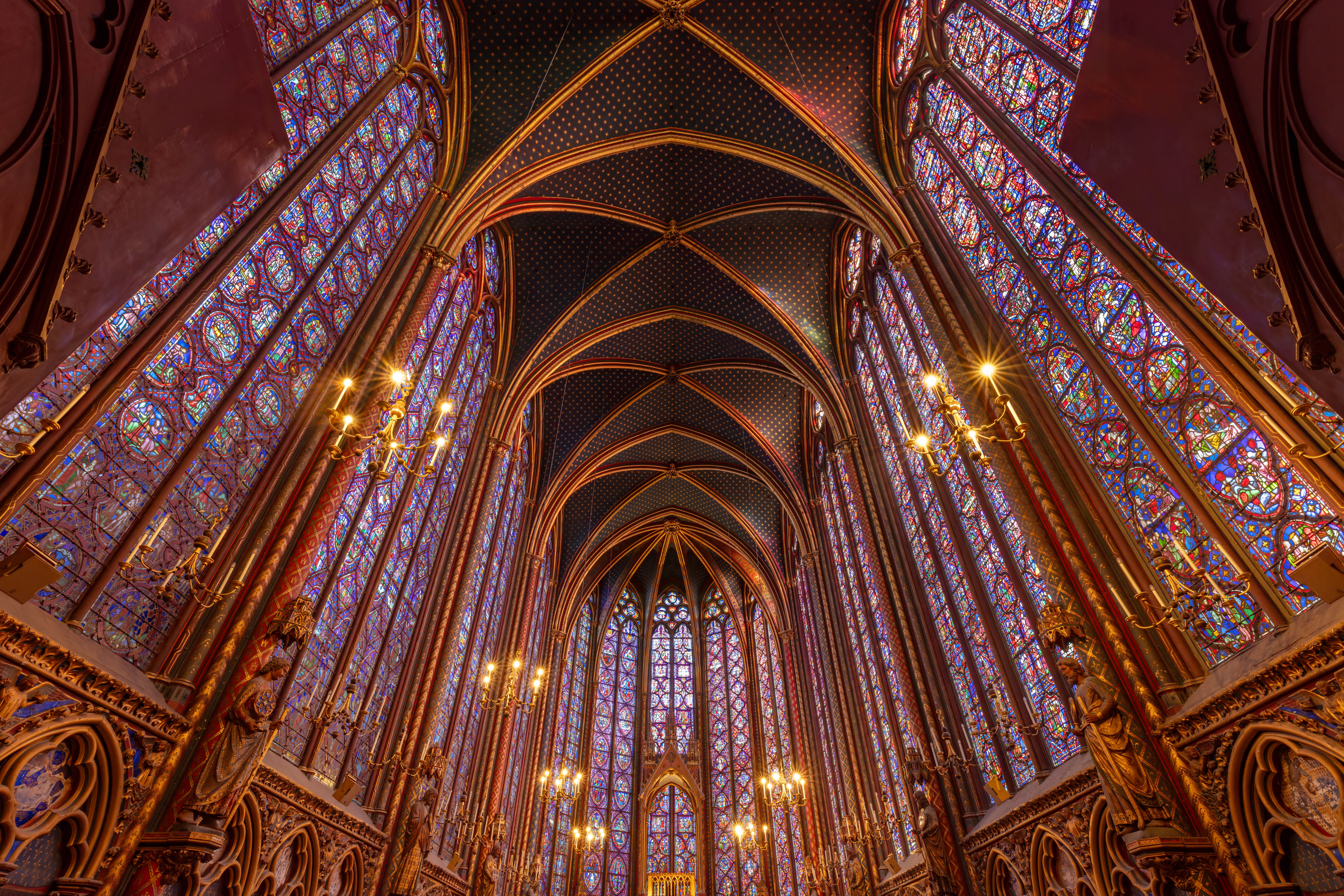
An interior view of the Sainte-Chapelle on the Île de la Cité in Paris, France, completed in 1248. During the Middle Ages, many buildings in the Gothic architecture-style were erected as places of worship for the Catholic Church.

From Late Antiquity to the dawn of the modern age, the Catholic Church held a dominant influence on Western civilization, being the primary sponsor of Romanesque, Gothic, Renaissance, Mannerist, and Baroque styles in art, architecture, and music—including visual artists like Raphael, Michelangelo, Leonardo da Vinci, Sandro Botticelli, Fra Angelico, Tintoretto, Titian, Gian Lorenzo Bernini, and Caravaggio. (Note: Woods, Thomas E. Jr. (2005). How the Catholic Church built Western civilization. Regnery Pub. ISBN 978-0-89526-038-3. pp. 115–27.) A Stanford University historian Paul Legutko said the church is "at the center of the development of the values, ideas, science, laws, and institutions" of Western civilization.

Monks established the first universities in Europe in the time of Western Christendom. In higher education, several older cathedral schools became universities beginning in the 11th century, including the University of Oxford, University of Paris, and University of Bologna. Dating back to 6th-century AD, monks and nuns spearheaded higher education with Christian cathedral schools or monastic schools. These new universities expanded their curriculums to include academic programs for clerics, lawyers, civil servants, and physicians. Thus, due to its initial origins, the university is generally regarded as starting in a Medieval Christian setting.

Massive mid-7th century Islamic invasions elongated the struggles of power between Christianity and Islam throughout the Mediterranean Basis; the Byzantine Empire lost its lands of the eastern patriarchates of Jerusalem, Alexandria and Antioch were reduced to Constantinople, the empire's capital, and the Frankish state, centered away from the Islamic domination of the Mediterranean, evolved into the dominant power that shaped the Western Europe of the Middle Ages. Battles in Toulouse and Tours halted Islamic advancements in the West; a failed siege of Constantinople halted them in the East. In 751, the Byzantine Empire lost the city of Ravenna, which governed the small fragments of Italy, including Rome, to the Lombards, meaning confirmation by a no longer existent exarch was not asked during the election of Pope Stephen II in 752—the papacy had to look elsewhere for a civil power to protect it. The Frankish king Pepin the Short conquered the Lombards in 754 at the urgent request of Pope Stephen, and then gifted the lands back to the pope, initiating the time of the Papal States. In the 860s, Rome and the Byzantine East had a conflict during the Photian schism, as Photius criticized the Latin West for adding the filioque clause, after being excommunicated by Nicholas I, causing unresolved issues that led to further divisions.

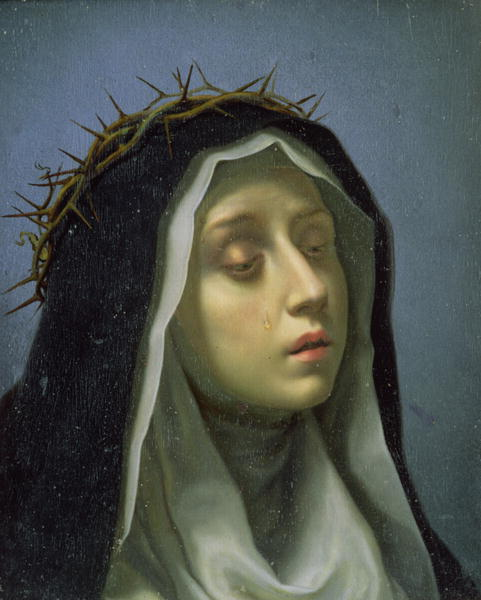
A painting of St. Catherine of Siena by Carlo Dolci. A 14th century Catholic mystic associated with Dominican spirituality, she helped to heal the Great Western Schism.

In the 11th century the efforts of Hildebrand of Sovana led to the creation of the College of Cardinals to elect new popes, starting with Pope Alexander II in the papal election of 1061. When Alexander II died, Hildebrand was elected to succeed him, as Pope Gregory VII. The basic election system of the College of Cardinals which Gregory VII helped establish has continued to function into the 21st century. Pope Gregory VII further initiated the Gregorian Reforms regarding the independence of the clergy from secular authority. This led to the Investiture Controversy between the church and the Holy Roman emperors, over which had the authority to appoint bishops and popes. (Note: Fr John Vidmar, O.P. (2005). The Catholic Church Through the Ages. Paulist Press. ISBN 978-0-8091-4234-7. pp. 107–11.)

In 1095 the Byzantine emperor, Alexius I, appealed to Pope Urban II for help against renewed Muslim invasions in the Byzantine–Seljuk wars, which caused Urban to launch the First Crusade aimed at aiding the Byzantine Empire and returning the Holy Land to Christian control. In the 11th century strained relations between the primarily Greek church and the Latin Church separated them in the East–West Schism, partially due to conflicts over papal authority. The Fourth Crusade and the sacking of Constantinople by renegade crusaders proved the final breach.

In the twelfth century, inquisitions began in the Catholic Kingdom of France in response to the Albigensians. The system spread throughout other European countries in the succeeding centuries, through multiple forms: first as individual inquisitors sporadically appointed for certain problem areas by popes, then as state-sponsored tribunals. The ad hoc use of torture by secular medieval judges was common, and the directives governing inquisitions progressively allowed various situations where non-maiming, non-bloody torture could or must be used to corroborate testimony, not only on some classes of accused but sometimes even on denouncers and witnesses.

In the early 13th century mendicant orders were founded by Francis of Assisi and Dominic de Guzmán. The studia conventualia and studia generalia of the mendicant orders played a large role in the transformation of church-sponsored cathedral schools and palace schools, such as that of Charlemagne at Aachen, into the prominent universities of Europe. Scholastic theologians and philosophers such as the Dominican priest Thomas Aquinas studied and taught at these studia. Aquinas' Summa Theologica was an intellectual milestone in its synthesis of the legacy of ancient Greek philosophers such as Plato and Aristotle with the content of Christian revelation.

A growing sense of church-state conflicts marked the 14th century. In 1309, to escape instability in Rome, Pope Clement V became the first of seven popes to reside in the fortified city of Avignon in southern France during a period known as the Avignon Papacy. The Avignon Papacy ended in 1376 when the pope returned to Rome. In 1378 a 38-year-long Western Schism began, with claimants to the papacy located in Rome, Avignon and, after 1409, Pisa. The matter was largely resolved in 1414–1418 at the Council of Constance, with the claimants in Rome and Pisa agreeing to resign and the third claimant excommunicated by the cardinals, who held a new election naming Martin V pope.

In 1438 the Council of Florence convened, which featured a strong dialogue focused on understanding the theological differences between the East and West, with the hope of reuniting the Catholic and Orthodox churches. Several eastern churches reunited, forming the majority of the Eastern Catholic Churches.

=== Age of Discovery and Counter-Reformation ===
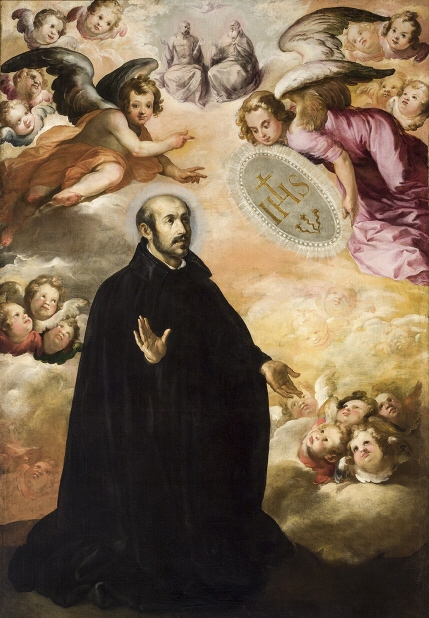
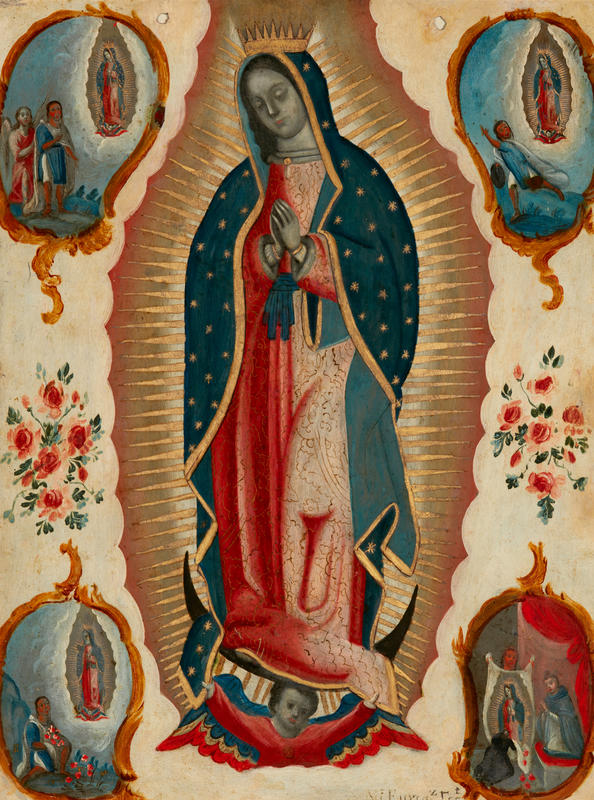
With the rise of Protestantism, the Catholic Church lost some adherents in Europe. Counter-Reformation groups such as the Jesuits were founded to tackle this. At the same time, Catholicism spread in the Americas through evangelisation, represented by the apparition of Our Lady of Guadalupe.

The Age of Discovery beginning in the 15th century saw the expansion of Western Europe's political and cultural influence worldwide. Because of the rise in power overseas of strongly Catholic nations of Spain and Portugal (as well as France), Catholicism was spread to the Americas, Asia and Oceania by explorers, conquistadors, and missionaries, as well as by the conversion of people who lived in these societies to the Catholic faith. Pope Alexander VI had awarded sovereignty rights over most of the newly discovered lands to Spain and Portugal (later confirmed by the Treaty of Tordesillas) (Note: Koschorke, Klaus; Ludwig, Frieder; Delgado, Mariano, eds. (2007). A History of Christianity in Asia, Africa, and Latin America, 1450–1990: A Documentary Sourcebook. Wm B. Eerdmans Publishing Co. ISBN 978-0-8028-2889-7. pp. 13, 283.) and the ensuing patronato system allowed state authorities, not the Vatican, to control all clerical appointments in the new colonies. In 1521 the Portuguese explorer Ferdinand Magellan made the first Catholic converts in the Philippines. Elsewhere, Portuguese missionaries under the Spanish Jesuit Francis Xavier evangelized in India, China and Japan. The French colonization of the Americas beginning in the 16th century established a Catholic Francophone population and forbade non-Catholics to settle in Quebec and other colonies in the greater territory of New France.

In 1415 popular Bohemian preacher Jan Hus was burned at the stake for refusing to recant Wycliffite heresies. His "hot-headed" reform efforts presaged Martin Luther, an Augustinian friar in Germany, who sent a list of topics for academic disputation, the Ninety-five Theses, to several bishops in 1517. His theses protested against some Catholic doctrines as well as contemporary practices such as the supposed sale of indulgences, and these were the start of a rapidly escalating series of inflammatory works ending with On the Babylonian Captivity of the Church (1520) which accused the Pope of being the anti-Christ: this led to his excommunication in 1521. In Switzerland Huldrych Zwingli, John Calvin and other Protestant Reformers further criticized certain Catholic teachings. These challenges developed into the Reformation, which gave birth to the great majority of Protestant denominations and also crypto-Protestantism within the Catholic Church. Meanwhile, Henry VIII of the Kingdom of England petitioned Pope Clement VII for a declaration of nullity concerning his marriage to Catherine of Aragon. When this was denied, he had the Acts of Supremacy passed to make himself Supreme Head of the Church of England, spurring the English Reformation and the eventual development of Anglicanism.

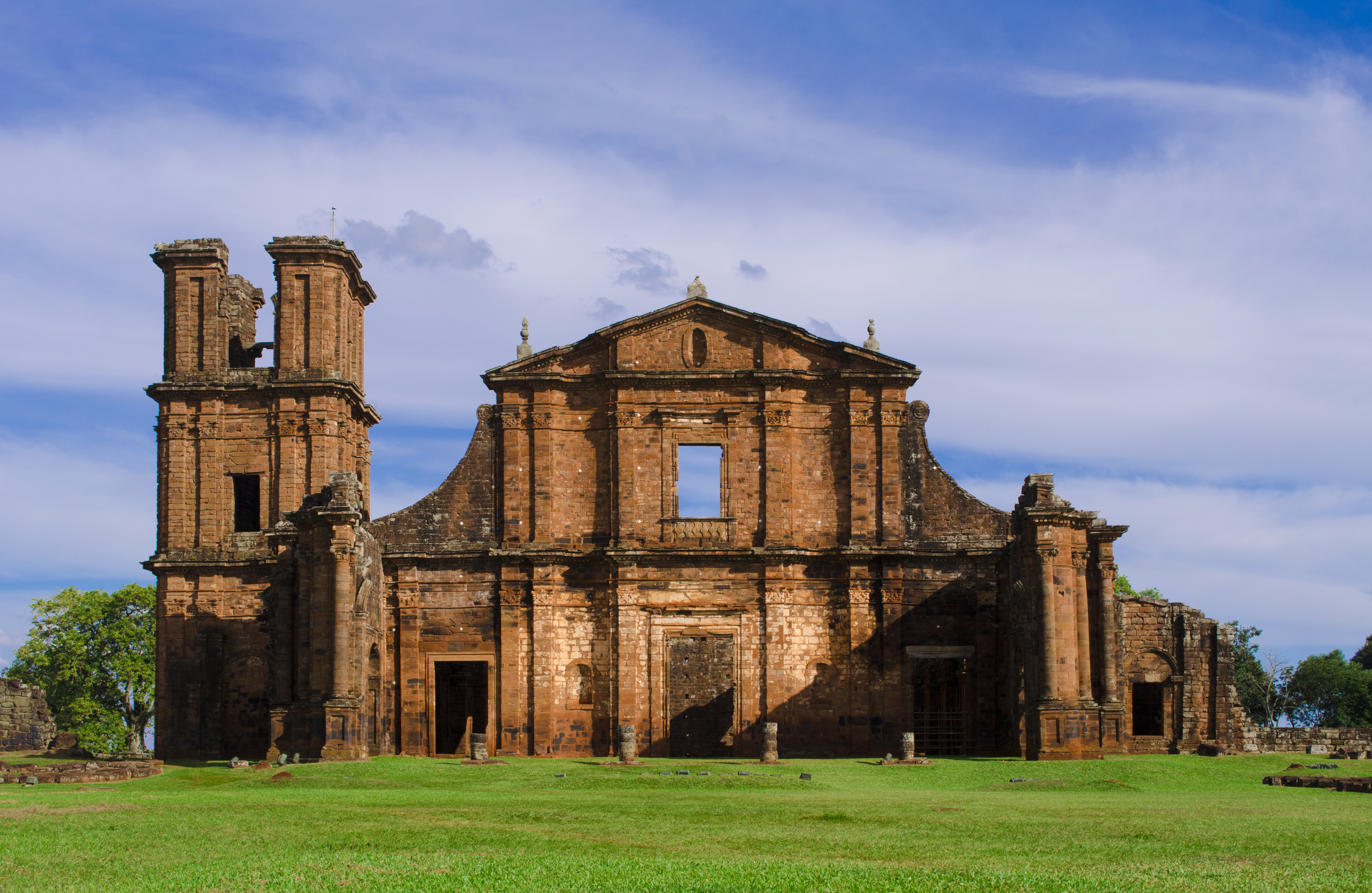
Ruins of the Jesuit mission of São Miguel das Missões in Brazil

The Reformation contributed to clashes between the Protestant Schmalkaldic League and the Catholic Emperor Charles V and his allies. The first nine-year war ended in 1555 with the Peace of Augsburg but continued tensions produced a far graver conflict—the Thirty Years' War—which broke out in 1618. In France a series of conflicts termed the French Wars of Religion was fought from 1562 to 1598 between the Huguenots (French Calvinists) and the forces of the French Catholic League, which were backed and funded by a series of popes. This ended under Pope Clement VIII, who hesitantly accepted King Henry IV of France's 1598 Edict of Nantes granting civil and religious toleration to French Protestants.

The Council of Trent (1545–1563) became the driving force behind the Counter-Reformation in response to the Protestant movement. Doctrinally, it reaffirmed many central Catholic teachings such as transubstantiation, the keeping of the sacraments, and the requirement of good works anchored in love and hope to justify one's salvation, as well as faith as a necessary condition to attain such salvation. In subsequent centuries, Catholicism spread widely across the world, in part through missionaries and imperialism, although its hold on European populations declined due to the growth of religious skepticism during and after the Enlightenment.

=== Enlightenment and modern period ===
From the 17th century onward, the Enlightenment questioned the power and influence of the Catholic Church over Western society. In the 18th century, writers such as Voltaire and the Encyclopédistes wrote biting critiques of both religion and the Catholic Church. One target of their criticism was the 1685 revocation of the Edict of Nantes by King Louis XIV of France, which ended a century-long policy of religious toleration of Protestant Huguenots. As the papacy resisted pushes for Gallicanism, the French Revolution in 1789 shifted power to the state, caused the destruction of churches, the establishment of a Cult of Reason, and the martyrdom of nuns during the Reign of Terror. In 1798 Napoleon's General Louis-Alexandre Berthier invaded the Italian Peninsula, imprisoning Pope Pius VI, who died in captivity. Napoleon later re-established the Catholic Church in France through the Concordat of 1801. The end of the Napoleonic Wars brought Catholic revival and the return of the Papal States.

In 1854 Pope Pius IX, with the support of the overwhelming majority of Catholic bishops, whom he had consulted from 1851 to 1853, proclaimed the Immaculate Conception as a dogma in the Catholic Church. In 1870 the First Vatican Council affirmed the doctrine of papal infallibility when exercised in specifically defined pronouncements, striking a blow to the rival position of conciliarism. Controversy over this and other issues resulted in a breakaway movement called the Old Catholic Church.

The Italian unification of the 1860s incorporated the Papal States, including Rome itself from 1870, into the Kingdom of Italy, thus ending the papacy's temporal power. In response Pius IX excommunicated King Victor Emmanuel II, refused payment for the land and rejected the Italian Law of Guarantees, which granted him special privileges. To avoid placing himself in visible subjection to the Italian authorities, he remained a "prisoner in the Vatican". This stand-off, which was spoken of as the Roman question, was resolved by the Lateran Treaty in 1929, whereby the Holy See acknowledged Italian sovereignty over the former Papal States in return for payment and Italy's recognition of papal sovereignty over Vatican City as a new sovereign and independent state.

Catholic missionaries generally supported, and sought to facilitate, the European imperial powers' conquest of Africa during the late nineteenth century. According to the historian of religion Adrian Hastings, Catholic missionaries were generally unwilling to defend African rights or encourage Africans to see themselves as equals to Europeans, in contrast to Protestant missionaries, who were more willing to oppose colonial injustices.

=== 20th century ===
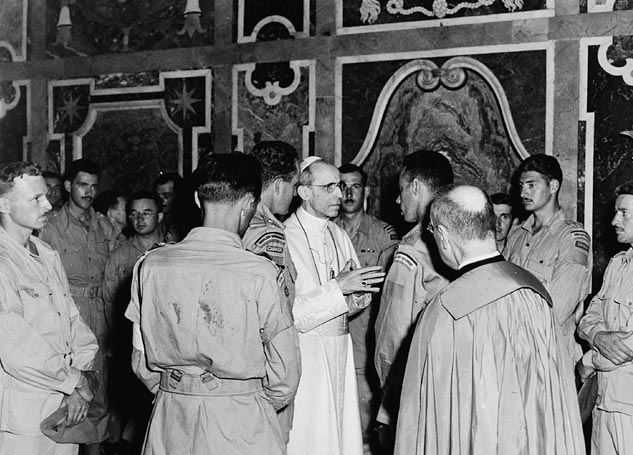
Members of the Canadian Army's Royal 22nd Regiment in audience with Pope Pius XII on 4 July 1944, following the Battle of Anzio, which liberated Rome from Nazi German and the Italian fascist occupation during World War II.

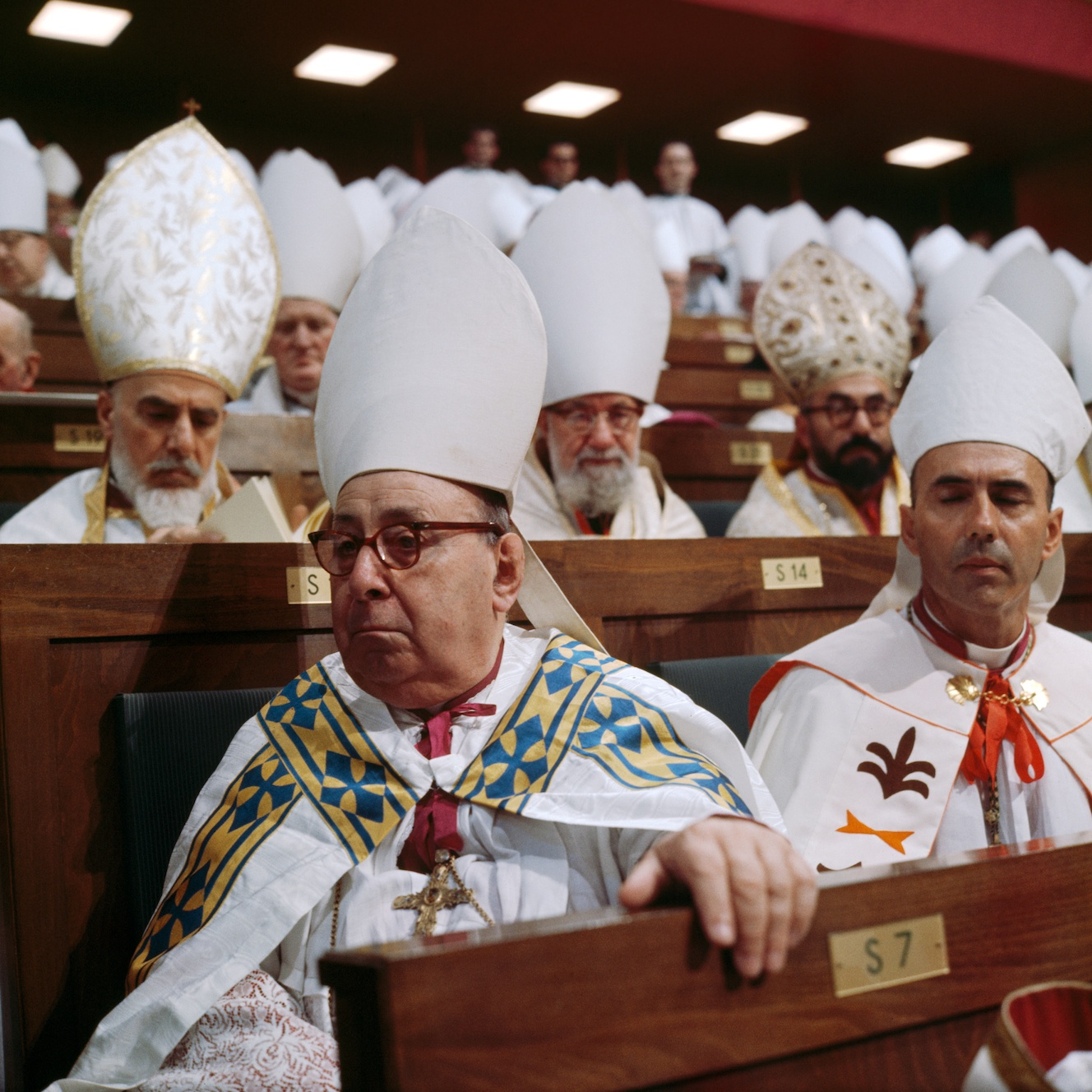
Bishops listen during the Second Vatican Council in the early 1960s

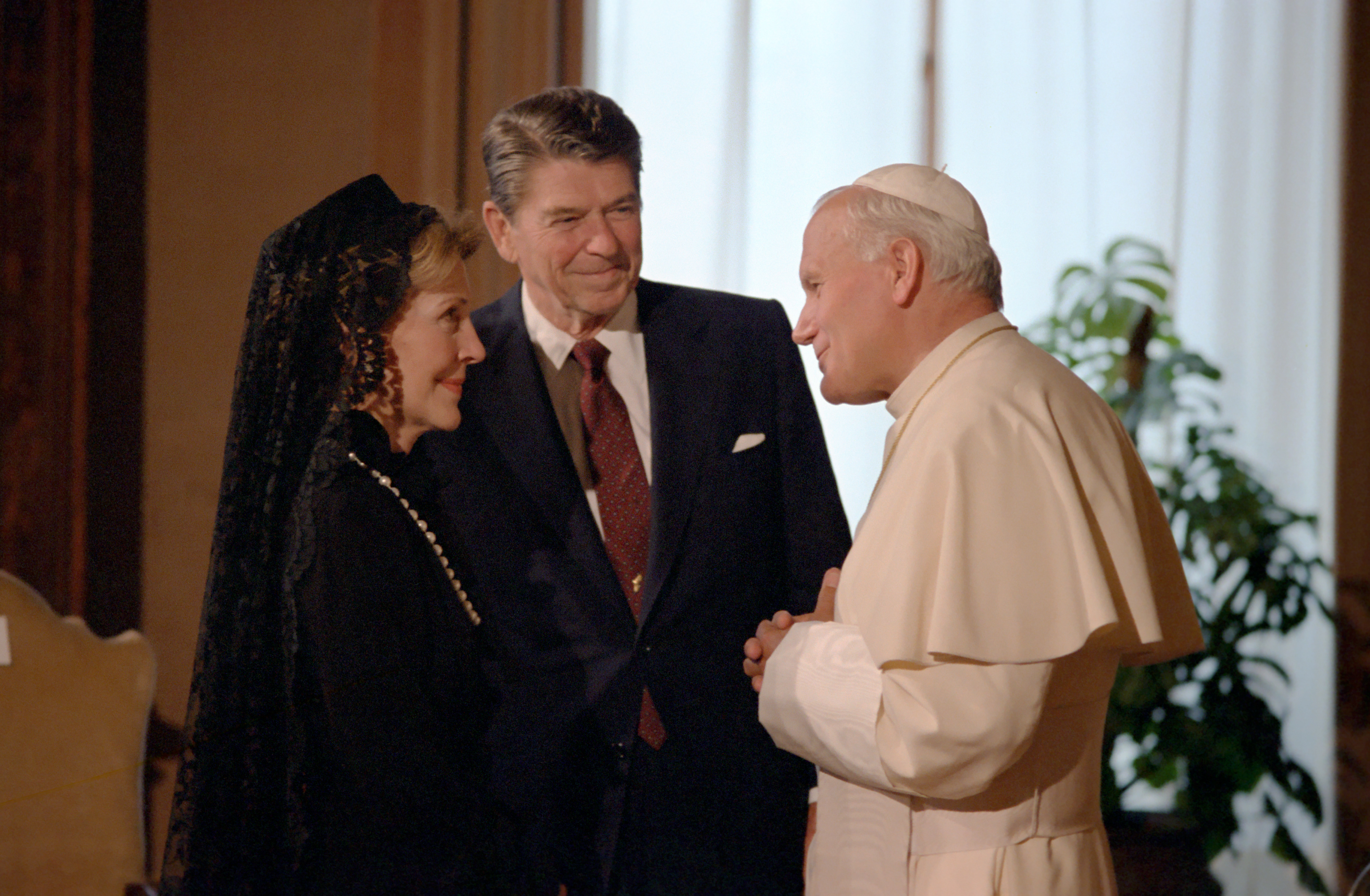
Pope John Paul II and then U.S. president Ronald Reagan (pictured with his wife Nancy) meeting in June 1982; both Pope John Paul II and Reagan were credited with contributing to the Revolutions of 1989, which led to the fall of communism and the end of the Cold War two years later, in 1991.

During the 20th century, the church's global reach continued to grow, despite the rise of anti-Catholic authoritarian regimes and the collapse of European colonial empires, accompanied by a general decline in religious observance in the West. Under the popes Benedict XV and Pius XII the Holy See sought to maintain public neutrality through the World Wars, acting as peace broker and delivering aid to the victims of the conflicts. In the 1960s Pope John XXIII convened the Second Vatican Council, which ushered in radical change to church ritual and practice, and in the later 20th century the long papacy of Pope John Paul II contributed to the fall of communism in Europe, and a new public and international role for the papacy. From the late 20th century, the Catholic Church has been criticized for its doctrines on sexuality, its inability to ordain women and its handling of sexual abuse cases.

The Second Vatican Council (1962–1965) introduced the most significant changes to Catholic practices since the Council of Trent, four centuries before. Initiated by Pope John XXIII, this ecumenical council modernized the practices of the Catholic Church, allowing the Mass to be said in the vernacular (local language) and encouraging "fully conscious, and active participation in liturgical celebrations". It intended to engage the church more closely with the present world (aggiornamento), which was described by its advocates as an "opening of the windows". In addition to changes in the liturgy, it led to changes to the church's approach to ecumenism, and a call to improved relations with non-Christian religions, especially Judaism, in its document Nostra aetate.

The council, however, generated significant controversy in implementing its reforms: proponents of the "Spirit of Vatican II" such as the Swiss theologian Hans Küng said that Vatican II had "not gone far enough" to change church policies. Traditionalist Catholics, such as Archbishop Marcel Lefebvre, however, strongly criticized the council, arguing that its liturgical reforms led "to the destruction of the Holy Sacrifice of the Mass and the sacraments", among other issues. The teaching on the morality of contraception also came under scrutiny; after a series of disagreements, Humanae vitae upheld the church's prohibition of all forms of contraception. (Note: While ruling contraception to be prohibited, Pope Paul VI did, however, consider natural family planning methods to be morally permissible if used with just cause.)

In 1978 Pope John Paul II, formerly Archbishop of Kraków in the Polish People's Republic, became the first non-Italian pope in 455 years. His 26 1/2-year pontificate was one of the longest in history and was credited with hastening the fall of communism in Europe. John Paul II sought to evangelize an increasingly secular world. He traveled more than any other pope, visiting 129 countries, and used television and radio as means of spreading the church's teachings. He also emphasized the dignity of work and natural rights of labourers to have fair wages and safe conditions in Laborem exercens. He emphasized several church teachings, including moral exhortations against abortion, euthanasia and against the widespread use of capital punishment, in Evangelium Vitae.

=== 21st century ===
Pope Benedict XVI, elected in 2005, was known for upholding traditional Christian values against secularization, and for increasing use of the Tridentine Mass as found in the Roman Missal of 1962, which he titled the "Extraordinary Form". Citing the frailties of advanced age, Benedict resigned in 2013, becoming the first pope to do so in nearly 600 years.

Pope Francis became in 2013 the first pope from the Americas, the first from the Southern Hemisphere and the first from outside Europe since the eighth-century Gregory III. Francis made efforts to further close Catholicism's estrangement with the Eastern churches. His installation was attended by Patriarch Bartholomew I of Constantinople of the Eastern Orthodox Church, the first time since the Great Schism of 1054 that the Ecumenical Patriarch of Constantinople has attended a papal installation, while he also met Patriarch Kirill of Moscow, head of the largest Eastern Orthodox church, in 2016; this was the first such high-level meeting between the two churches since the Great Schism of 1054. In 2017 during a visit in Egypt, Pope Francis re-established mutual recognition of baptism with the Coptic Orthodox Church.

Pope Leo XIV was elected as Pope in the 2025 conclave, following the death of Francis. He is the first Augustinian pope, the first North American pope (born in Chicago in the United States), and the first pope of Peruvian citizenship.

== Organization ==
The crossed keys of the Holy See symbolize those of Simon Peter. The triple crown papal tiara symbolizes the triple power of the pope as "father of kings", "governor of the world" and "Vicar of Christ". The gold cross symbolizes the sovereignty of Jesus.

The Catholic Church follows an episcopal polity, led by bishops who have received the sacrament of holy orders who are given formal jurisdictions of governance within the church. There are three levels of clergy: the episcopate, composed of bishops who hold jurisdiction over a geographic area called a diocese or eparchy; the presbyterate, composed of priests ordained by bishops and who work in local dioceses or religious orders; and the diaconate, composed of deacons who assist bishops and priests in a variety of ministerial roles. Ultimately leading the entire Catholic Church is the bishop of Rome, known as the pope (Latin: papa, lit. 'father'), whose jurisdiction is called the Holy See (Sancta Sedes in Latin).

In parallel to the diocesan structure are a variety of religious institutes that function autonomously, often subject only to the authority of the pope, though sometimes subject to the local bishop. Most religious institutes only have male or female members but some have both. Additionally, lay members aid many liturgical functions during worship services. The Catholic Church has been described as the oldest multinational organization in the world.

=== Holy See, papacy, Roman Curia, and College of Cardinals ===
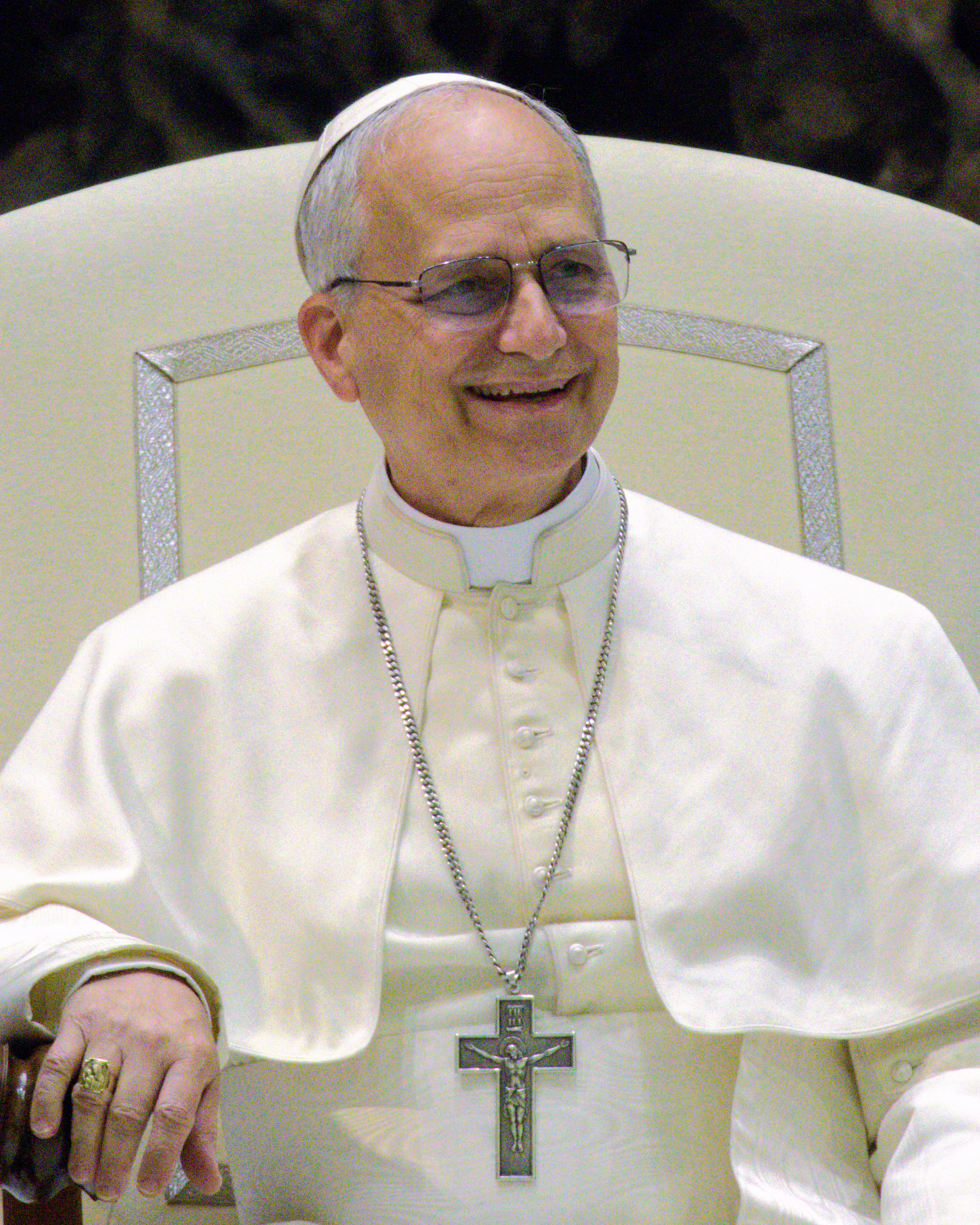
Pope Leo XIV, the 267th and current pope of the Catholic Church, a title he holds ex officio as bishop of Rome and sovereign of Vatican City, was elected in the 2025 papal conclave.

The hierarchy of the Catholic Church is headed (Note: According to Catholic teaching, Jesus Christ is the 'invisible Head' of the Church while the pope is the 'visible Head'.) by the pope, currently Pope Leo XIV, who was elected on 8 May 2025 by a papal conclave. The office of the pope is known as the papacy. The Catholic Church holds that Christ instituted the papacy upon giving the keys of Heaven to Saint Peter. His ecclesiastical jurisdiction is called the Holy See, or the Apostolic See (meaning the see of the apostle Peter). Directly serving the pope is the Roman Curia, the central governing body that administers the day-to-day business of the Catholic Church.

The pope is also sovereign of Vatican City, a small city-state entirely enclaved within the city of Rome, which is an entity distinct from the Holy See. It is as head of the Holy See, not as head of Vatican City State, that the pope receives ambassadors of states and sends them his own diplomatic representatives.

The position of cardinal is a rank of honour bestowed by popes on certain clerics, such as leaders within the Roman Curia, bishops serving in major cities and distinguished theologians. For advice and assistance in governing, the pope may turn to the College of Cardinals.

Following the death or resignation of a pope, (Note: The last resignation occurred on 28 February 2013, when Pope Benedict XVI retired, citing ill health in his advanced age. The next most recent resignation occurred in 1415, as part of the Council of Constance's resolution of the Avignon Papacy.) members of the College of Cardinals who are under age 80 act as an electoral college, meeting in a papal conclave to elect a successor. Although the conclave may elect any male Catholic in the world as pope, since 1389 only cardinals have been elected.

=== Canon law ===
Catholic canon law (Latin: jus canonicum) is the system of laws and legal principles made and enforced by the hierarchical authorities of the Catholic Church to regulate its external organization and government and to order and direct the activities of Catholics toward the mission of the church. The canon law of the Latin Church was the first modern Western legal system, and is the oldest continuously functioning legal system in the West, while the distinctive traditions of Eastern Catholic canon law govern the 23 Eastern Catholic particular churches sui iuris.

Positive ecclesiastical laws, based directly or indirectly upon immutable divine law or natural law, derive formal authority in the case of universal laws from promulgation by the supreme legislator—the Supreme Pontiff—who possesses the totality of legislative, executive and judicial power in his person, while particular laws derive formal authority from promulgation by a legislator inferior to the supreme legislator, whether an ordinary or a delegated legislator. The actual subject material of the canons is not just doctrinal or moral in nature, but all-encompassing of the human condition. It has all the ordinary elements of a mature legal system: laws, courts, lawyers, judges, a fully articulated legal code for the Latin Church as well as a code for the Eastern Catholic Churches, principles of legal interpretation, and coercive penalties.

Canon law concerns the Catholic Church's life and organization and is distinct from civil law. In its own field it gives force to civil law only by specific enactment in matters such as the guardianship of minors. Similarly, civil law may give force in its field to canon law, but only by specific enactment, as with regard to canonical marriages. Currently, the 1983 Code of Canon Law is in effect for the Latin Church. The distinct 1990 Code of Canons of the Eastern Churches (CCEO, after the Latin initials) applies to the autonomous Eastern Catholic Churches.

=== Latin and Eastern churches ===
In the first thousand years of Catholic history, different varieties of Christianity developed in the Western and Eastern Christian areas of Europe, Asia and Africa. Though most Eastern-tradition churches are no longer in communion with the Catholic Church after the Great Schism of 1054 (as well as the earlier Nestorian Schism and Chalcedonian Schism), 23 autonomous particular churches of eastern traditions participate in the Catholic communion, also known as "churches sui iuris" (Latin: "of one's own right"). The largest and most well known is the Latin Church, the only Western-tradition church, with more than 1 billion members worldwide. Relatively small in terms of adherents compared to the Latin Church, are the 23 self-governing Eastern Catholic Churches with a combined membership of 17.3 million as of 2010.

The Latin Church is governed by the pope and diocesan bishops directly appointed by him. The pope exercises a direct patriarchal role over the Latin Church, which is considered to form the original and still major part of Western Christianity, a heritage of certain beliefs and customs originating in Europe and northwestern Africa, some of which are inherited by many Christian denominations that trace their origins to the Protestant Reformation.

The Eastern Catholic Churches follow the traditions and spirituality of Eastern Christianity and are churches that have always remained in full communion with the Catholic Church or who have chosen to re-enter full communion in the centuries following the East–West Schism or earlier divisions. These churches are communities of Catholic Christians whose forms of worship reflect distinct historical and cultural influences rather than differences in doctrine.

The pope's recognition of Eastern Catholic Churches has caused controversy in ecumenical relations with the Eastern Orthodox and other eastern churches. Historically, pressure to conform to the norms of the Western Christianity practised by the majority Latin Church led to a degree of encroachment (Liturgical Latinisation) on some of the Eastern Catholic traditions. The Second Vatican Council document, Orientalium Ecclesiarum, built on previous reforms to reaffirm the right of Eastern Catholics to maintain their distinct liturgical practices.

A church sui iuris is defined in the Code of Canons for the Eastern Churches as a "group of Christian faithful united by a hierarchy" that is recognized by the pope in his capacity as the supreme authority on matters of doctrine within the church. The Eastern Catholic Churches are in full communion with the pope, but have governance structures and liturgical traditions separate from that of the Latin Church.

Some Eastern Catholic churches are governed by a patriarch who is elected by the synod of the bishops of that church, others are headed by a major archbishop, others are under a metropolitan, and others are organized as individual eparchies. Each church has authority over the particulars of its internal organization, liturgical rites, liturgical calendar and other aspects of its spirituality, subject only to the authority of the pope. The Roman Curia has a specific department, the Congregation for the Oriental Churches, to maintain relations with them.

=== Dioceses, parishes, organizations, and institutes ===
Distribution of Catholics

The percentage of Catholics by country, 2010

The number of Catholics by country, 2010

Individual countries, regions, and major cities are served by particular churches known as dioceses in the Latin Church, or eparchies in the Eastern Catholic Churches, each of which are overseen by a bishop. As of 2021, the Catholic Church has 3,171 dioceses globally. The bishops in a particular country are members of a national or regional episcopal conference.

Dioceses are divided into parishes, each with one or more priests, deacons, or lay ecclesial ministers. Parishes are responsible for the day to day celebration of the sacraments and pastoral care of the laity. As of 2016 there are approximately 221,700 parishes worldwide.

In the Latin Church, Catholic men may serve as deacons or priests by receiving sacramental ordination. Men and women may serve as extraordinary ministers of Holy Communion, as readers (lectors), or as altar servers. Historically, boys and men have only been permitted to serve as altar servers; however, since the 1990s, girls and women have also been permitted. (Note: In 1992, the Vatican clarified the 1983 Code of Canon Law removed the requirement that altar servers be male; permission to use female altar servers within a diocese is at the discretion of the bishop.)

Catholics may enter into consecrated life either on an individual basis, as a hermit or consecrated virgin, or by joining an institute of consecrated life (a religious institute or a secular institute) in which to take vows confirming their desire to follow the three evangelical counsels of chastity, poverty and obedience. Examples of institutes of consecrated life are the Benedictines, the Carmelites, the Dominicans, the Franciscans, the Missionaries of Charity, the Legionaries of Christ and the Sisters of Mercy.

"Religious institutes" is a modern term encompassing both "religious orders" and "religious congregations", which were once distinguished in canon law. The terms "religious order" and "religious institute" tend to be used as synonyms colloquially.

By means of Catholic charities and beyond, the Catholic Church is the largest non-government provider of education and health care in the world.

=== Membership ===
View source data.
View source data.

Geographic distribution of Catholics in 2023
Americas	47.8%
Europe	20.4%
Africa	20.0%
Asia	11.0%
Oceania	0.8%

As of 2020 Catholicism is the second-largest religious body in the world after Sunni Islam. Catholics represent about half of all Christians. According to the World Christian Database, there are 1.279 billion Catholics constituting 47.8% of 2.674 billion Christians globally, as of 2026. According to the Annuario Pontificio, church membership, defined as baptized Catholics, was 1.406 billion at the end of 2023, which was 17.4% of the world population: Under Pope Francis the church membership grew by almost 11%, with growth concentrated in Africa and loss in Europe.

Brazil has the largest Catholic population in the world, followed by Mexico, the Philippines and the United States.

Geographic distribution of Catholics worldwide continues to shift, with 20.0% in Africa, 47.8% in the Americas, 11.0% in Asia, 20.4% in Europe and 0.8% in Oceania.

Catholic ministers include ordained clergy, lay ecclesial ministers, missionaries and catechists. Also as of the end of 2023, there were 463,859 ordained clergy, including 5,430 bishops, 406,996 priests (diocesan and religious) and 51,433 deacons (permanent). Non-ordained ministers, as at October 2024, include 2,883,049 catechists and 413,561 lay missionaries.

Catholics who have committed to religious or consecrated life as a state of life or relational vocation include 49,414 male religious (as of 2022) and 589,423 women religious (as of 2023). These are not ordained, nor generally called "ministers" unless also engaged in one of the lay minister categories above.

== Doctrine ==
Catholic doctrine has developed over the centuries, reflecting direct teachings of early Christians, formal definitions of heretical and orthodox beliefs by ecumenical councils and in papal bulls, and theological debate by scholars. The church believes that it is continually guided by the Holy Spirit as it discerns new theological issues and is protected infallibly from falling into doctrinal error when a firm decision on an issue is reached.

It teaches that revelation has one common source, God, and two distinct modes of transmission: Sacred Scripture and Sacred Tradition, and that these are authentically interpreted by the Magisterium. Sacred Scripture consists of the 73 books of the Catholic Bible, consisting of 46 Old Testament and 27 New Testament writings. Sacred Tradition consists of those teachings believed by the church to have been handed down since the time of the Apostles. Sacred Scripture and Sacred Tradition are collectively known as the "deposit of faith" (depositum fidei in Latin). These are in turn interpreted by the Magisterium (from magister, Latin for "teacher"), the church's teaching authority, which is exercised by the pope and the College of Bishops in union with the pope. Catholic doctrine is authoritatively summarized in the Catechism of the Catholic Church, published by the Holy See.

=== Nature of God ===
This diagram depicts the Shield of the Trinity, which expresses many aspects of the doctrine of the Trinity.

The Catholic Church holds that there is one eternal God, who exists as a perichoresis ("mutual indwelling") of three hypostases, or "persons": God the Father; God the Son; and God the Holy Spirit (also called the Holy Ghost), which together are called the "Holy Trinity".

Catholics believe that Jesus Christ is the "Second Person" of the Trinity, God the Son. In an event known as the Incarnation, through the power of the Holy Spirit, God became united with human nature through the conception of Christ in the womb of the Blessed Virgin Mary. Christ, therefore, is understood as being both fully divine and fully human, including possessing a human soul. It is taught that Christ's mission on earth included giving people his teachings and providing his example for them to follow as recorded in the four Gospels. Jesus is believed to have remained sinless while on earth, and to have allowed himself to be unjustly executed by crucifixion, as a sacrifice of himself to reconcile humanity to God; this reconciliation is known as the Paschal Mystery. The Greek term "Christ" and the Hebrew "Messiah" both mean "anointed one", referring to the Christian belief that Jesus' death and resurrection are the fulfillment of the Old Testament's messianic prophecies.

The Catholic Church teaches dogmatically that "the Holy Spirit proceeds eternally from the Father and the Son, not as from two principles but as from one single principle". It holds that the Father, as the "principle without principle", is the first origin of the Spirit, but also that he, as Father of the only Son, is with the Son the single principle from which the Spirit proceeds. This belief is expressed in the Filioque clause which was added to the Latin version of the Nicene Creed of 381 but not included in the Greek versions of the creed used in Eastern Christianity.

=== Nature of the church ===
The Catholic Church teaches that it is the "one true church", "the universal sacrament of salvation for the human race", and "the one true religion". According to the Catechism, the Catholic Church is further described in the Nicene Creed as the "one, holy, catholic, and apostolic Church". These are collectively known as the Four Marks of the Church. The church teaches that its founder is Jesus Christ. The New Testament records several events considered integral to the establishment of the Catholic Church, including Jesus' activities and teaching and his appointment of the apostles as witnesses to his ministry, suffering, and resurrection. The Great Commission, after his resurrection, instructed the apostles to continue his work. The coming of the Holy Spirit upon the apostles, in an event known as Pentecost, is seen as the beginning of the public ministry of the Catholic Church. The church teaches that all duly consecrated bishops have a lineal succession from the apostles of Christ, known as apostolic succession. In particular, the Bishop of Rome (the pope) is considered the successor to the apostle Simon Peter, a position from which he derives his supremacy over the church.

Catholic belief holds that the church "is the continuing presence of Jesus on earth" and that it alone possesses the full means of salvation. Through the passion (suffering) of Christ leading to his crucifixion as described in the Gospels, it is said Christ made himself an oblation to God the Father to reconcile humanity to God; the Resurrection of Jesus makes him the firstborn from the dead, the first among many brethren. By reconciling with God and following Christ's words and deeds, an individual can enter the Kingdom of God. The church sees its liturgy and sacraments as perpetuating the graces achieved through Christ's sacrifice to strengthen a person's relationship with Christ and aid in overcoming sin.

=== Final judgement ===
The Catholic Church teaches that, immediately after death, the soul of each person will receive a particular judgement from God, based on their sins and their relationship to Christ. This teaching also attests to another day when Christ will sit in universal judgement of all mankind. This final judgement, according to the Church's teaching, will bring an end to human history and mark the beginning of both a new and better heaven and earth ruled by God in righteousness.

Depending on the judgement rendered following death, it is believed that a soul may enter one of three states of the afterlife:

- Heaven is a state of unending union with the divine nature of God, not ontologically, but by grace. It is an eternal life, in which the soul contemplates God in ceaseless beatitude.
- Purgatory is a temporary condition for the purification of souls who, although destined for Heaven, are not fully detached from sin and thus cannot enter Heaven immediately. In Purgatory, the soul suffers, and is purged and perfected. Souls in purgatory may be aided in reaching heaven by the prayers of the faithful on earth and by the intercession of saints.
- Final Damnation: Finally, those who persist in living in a state of mortal sin and do not repent before death subject themselves to hell, an everlasting separation from God. The church teaches that no one is condemned to hell without having freely decided to reject God. No one is predestined to hell and no one can determine with absolute certainty who has been condemned to hell. Catholicism teaches that through God's mercy a person can repent at any point before death, be illuminated with the truth of the Catholic faith, and thus obtain salvation. Some Catholic theologians have speculated that the souls of unbaptized infants and non-Christians without mortal sin but who die in original sin are assigned to limbo, although this is not an official dogma of the church.

While the Catholic Church teaches that it alone possesses the full means of salvation, it also acknowledges that the Holy Spirit can make use of Christian communities separated from itself to "impel towards Catholic unity" and "tend and lead toward the Catholic Church", and thus bring people to salvation, because these separated communities contain some elements of proper doctrine, albeit admixed with errors. It teaches that anyone who is saved is saved through the Catholic Church but that people can be saved outside of the ordinary means known as baptism of desire, and by pre-baptismal martyrdom, known as baptism of blood, as well as when conditions of invincible ignorance are present, although invincible ignorance in itself is not a means of salvation. The Vatican II document Lumen gentium further clarifies the possibility of salvation of "those who, through no fault of their own, do not know the Gospel of Christ or his Church, but who nevertheless seek God with a sincere heart".

=== Saints and devotions ===
A saint (also historically known as a hallow) is a person who is recognized as having an exceptional degree of holiness or likeness or closeness to God, while canonization is the act by which a Christian church declares that a person who has died was a saint, upon which declaration the person is included in the "canon", or list, of recognized saints. The first persons honoured as saints were the martyrs. By the fourth century, however, "confessors"—people who had confessed their faith not by dying but by suffering—began to be venerated publicly.

In the Catholic Church, both in Latin and Eastern Catholic churches, the act of canonization is reserved to the Apostolic See and occurs at the conclusion of a long process requiring extensive proof that the candidate for canonization lived and died in such an exemplary and holy way that he is worthy to be recognized as a saint. The church's official recognition of sanctity implies that the person is now in Heaven and that he may be publicly invoked and mentioned officially in the liturgy of the church, including in the Litany of the Saints. Canonization allows universal veneration of the saint in the liturgy of the Roman Rite; for permission to venerate at a local level only beatification is needed.

Devotions are "external practices of piety" which are not part of the official liturgy of the Catholic Church but are part of the popular spiritual practices of Catholics. These include various practices regarding the veneration of the saints, especially veneration of the Virgin Mary. Other devotional practices include the Stations of the Cross, the Sacred Heart of Jesus, the Holy Face of Jesus, the various scapulars, novenas to various saints, pilgrimages and devotions to the Blessed Sacrament, and the veneration of saintly images such as the santos. The bishops at the Second Vatican Council reminded Catholics that "devotions should be so drawn up that they harmonize with the liturgical seasons, accord with the sacred liturgy, are in some fashion derived from it, and lead the people to it, since, in fact, the liturgy by its very nature far surpasses any of them."

=== Virgin Mary ===
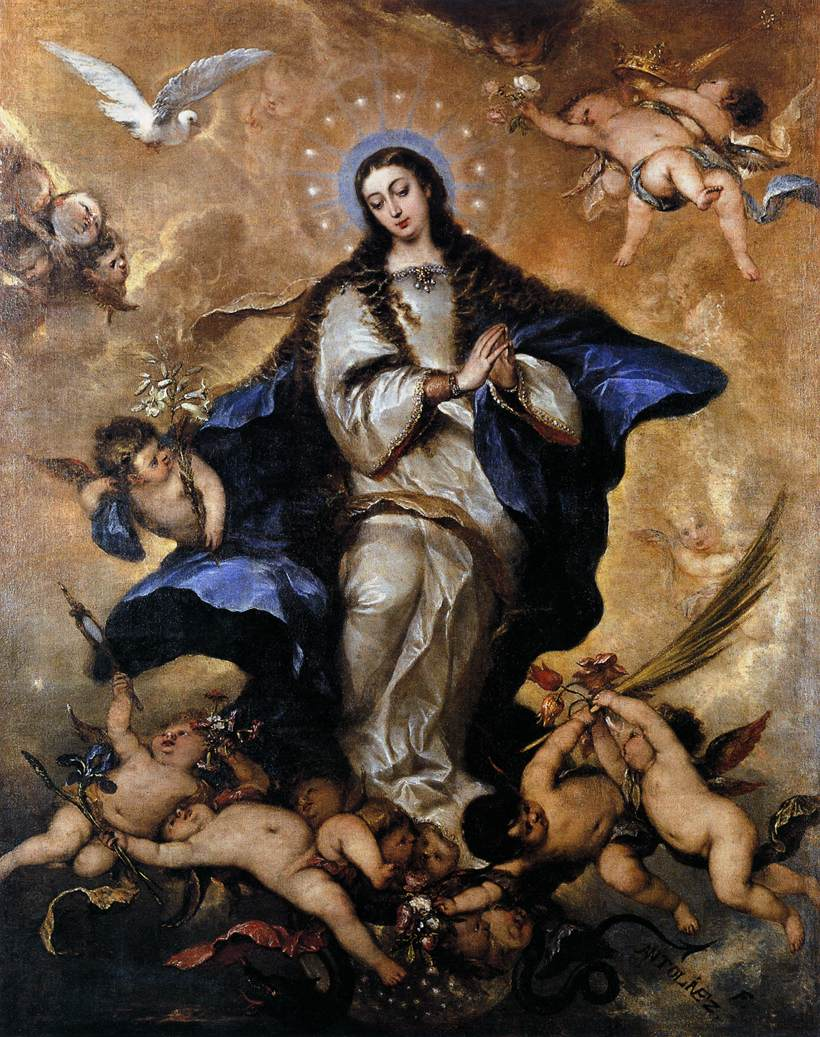
The Blessed Virgin Mary is highly regarded in the Catholic Church, proclaiming her as Mother of God, free from original sin and an intercessor.

Catholic Mariology deals with the dogmas and teachings concerning the life of Mary, mother of Jesus, as well as the veneration of Mary by the faithful. Mary is held in special regard, declared the Mother of God (Greek: Θεοτόκος, romanized: Theotokos, lit. 'God-bearer'), and believed as dogma to have remained a virgin throughout her life. Further teachings include the doctrines of the Immaculate Conception (her own conception without the stain of original sin) and the Assumption of Mary (that her body was assumed directly into heaven at the end of her life). Both of these doctrines were defined as infallible dogma, by Pope Pius IX in 1854 and Pope Pius XII in 1950 respectively, but only after consulting with the Catholic bishops throughout the world to ascertain that this is a Catholic belief. In the Eastern Catholic churches, however, they continue to celebrate the feast of the Assumption under the name of the Dormition of the Mother of God on the same date. The teaching that Mary died before being assumed significantly precedes the idea that she did not. St John Damascene wrote that "St Juvenal, Bishop of Jerusalem, at the Council of Chalcedon (451), made known to the Emperor Marcian and Pulcheria, who wished to possess the body of the Mother of God, that Mary died in the presence of all the Apostles, but that her tomb, when opened, upon the request of St Thomas, was found empty; wherefrom the Apostles concluded that the body was taken up to Heaven."

Devotions to Mary are part of Catholic piety but are distinct from the worship of God. Practices include prayers and Marian art, music and architecture. Several liturgical Marian feasts are celebrated throughout the Church Year and she is honoured with many titles such as Queen of Heaven. Pope Paul VI called her Mother of the Church because, by giving birth to Christ, she is considered to be the spiritual mother to each member of the Body of Christ. Because of her influential role in the life of Jesus, prayers and devotions such as the Hail Mary, the Rosary, the Salve Regina and the Memorare are common Catholic practices. Pilgrimage to the sites of several Marian apparitions affirmed by the church, such as Lourdes, Fátima and Guadalupe, are also popular Catholic devotions.

== Sacraments ==
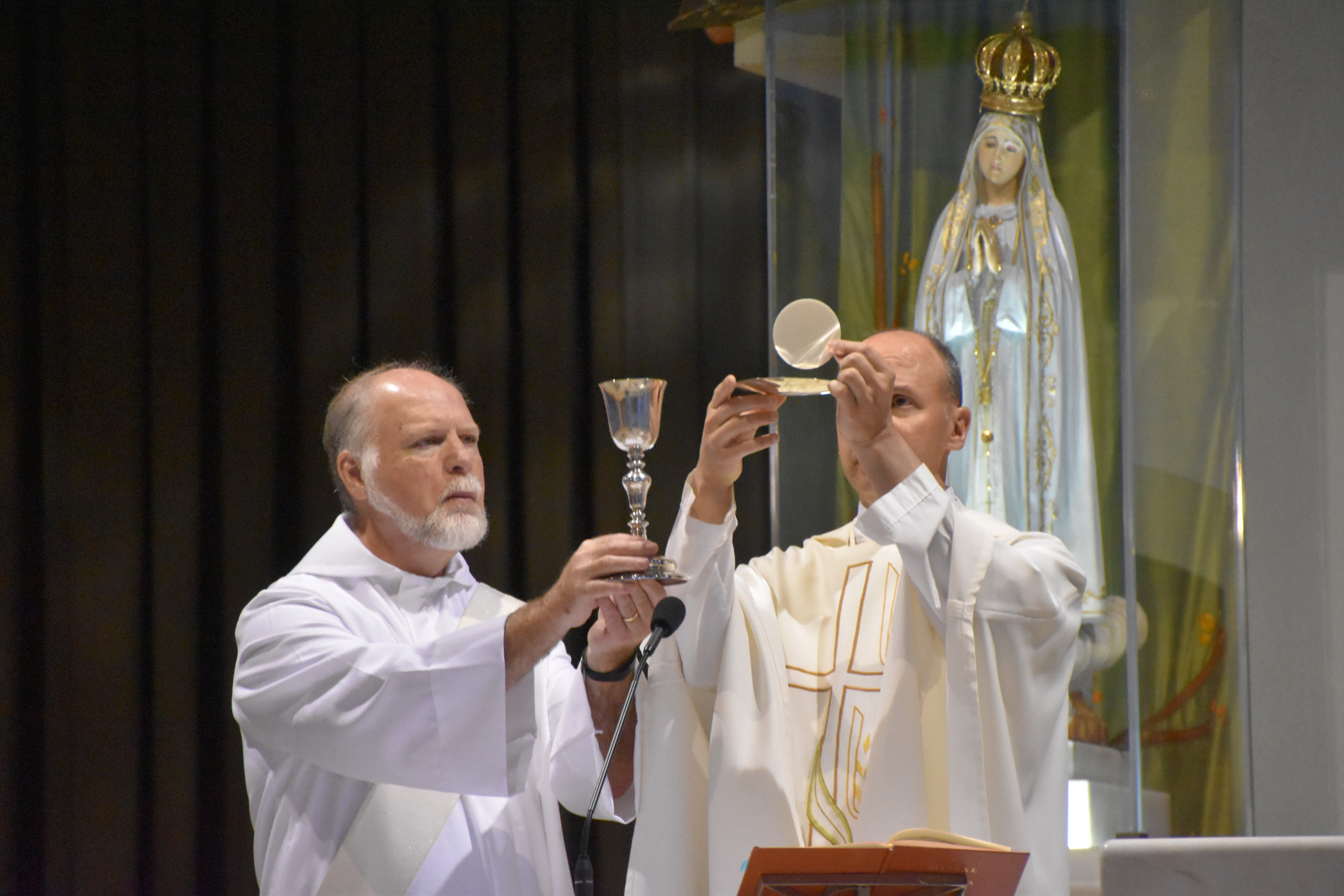
Holy Mass at the Sanctuary of Our Lady of Fátima, Portugal. The host and the chalice are displayed to the people immediately after the consecration of the bread and wine into the Holy Body and Blood of Christ.

The Catholic Church teaches that it was entrusted with seven sacraments that were instituted by Christ. The number and nature of the sacraments were defined by several ecumenical councils, most recently the Council of Trent. (Note: Other councils that addressed the sacraments include the Second Council of Lyon (1274); Council of Florence (1439); as well as the Council of Trent (1547)) These are baptism, confirmation, the Eucharist, penance, anointing of the sick (formerly called Extreme Unction, one of the "Last Rites"), holy orders and holy matrimony. Sacraments are visible rituals that Catholics see as signs of God's presence and effective channels of God's grace to all those who receive them with the proper disposition (ex opere operato). The Catechism of the Catholic Church categorizes the sacraments into three groups, the "sacraments of Christian initiation", "sacraments of healing" and "sacraments at the service of communion and the mission of the faithful". These groups broadly reflect the stages of people's natural and spiritual lives which each sacrament is intended to serve.

The liturgies of the sacraments are central to the church's mission. According to the Catechism:

In the liturgy of the New Covenant every liturgical action, especially the celebration of the Eucharist and the sacraments, is an encounter between Christ and the Church. The liturgical assembly derives its unity from the "communion of the Holy Spirit" who gathers the children of God into the one Body of Christ. This assembly transcends racial, cultural, social—indeed, all human affinities.

According to church doctrine, the sacraments of the church require the proper form, matter, and intent to be validly celebrated. In addition, the Canon Laws for both the Latin Church and the Eastern Catholic Churches govern who may licitly celebrate certain sacraments, as well as strict rules about who may receive the sacraments. Notably, because the church teaches that Christ is present in the Eucharist, those who are conscious of being in a state of mortal sin are forbidden to receive the sacrament until they have received absolution through the sacrament of Reconciliation (Penance). Catholics are normally obliged to abstain from eating for at least an hour before receiving the sacrament. Non-Catholics are ordinarily prohibited from receiving the Eucharist as well.

Catholics, even if they were in danger of death and unable to approach a Catholic minister, may not ask for the sacraments of the Eucharist, penance or anointing of the sick from someone, such as a Protestant minister, who is not known to be validly ordained in line with Catholic teaching on ordination. Likewise, even in grave and pressing need, Catholic ministers may not administer these sacraments to those who do not manifest Catholic faith in the sacrament. In relation to the churches of Eastern Christianity not in communion with the Holy See, the Catholic Church is less restrictive, declaring that "a certain communion in sacris, and so in the Eucharist, given suitable circumstances and the approval of Church authority, is not merely possible but is encouraged."

=== Sacraments of initiation ===
==== Baptism ====
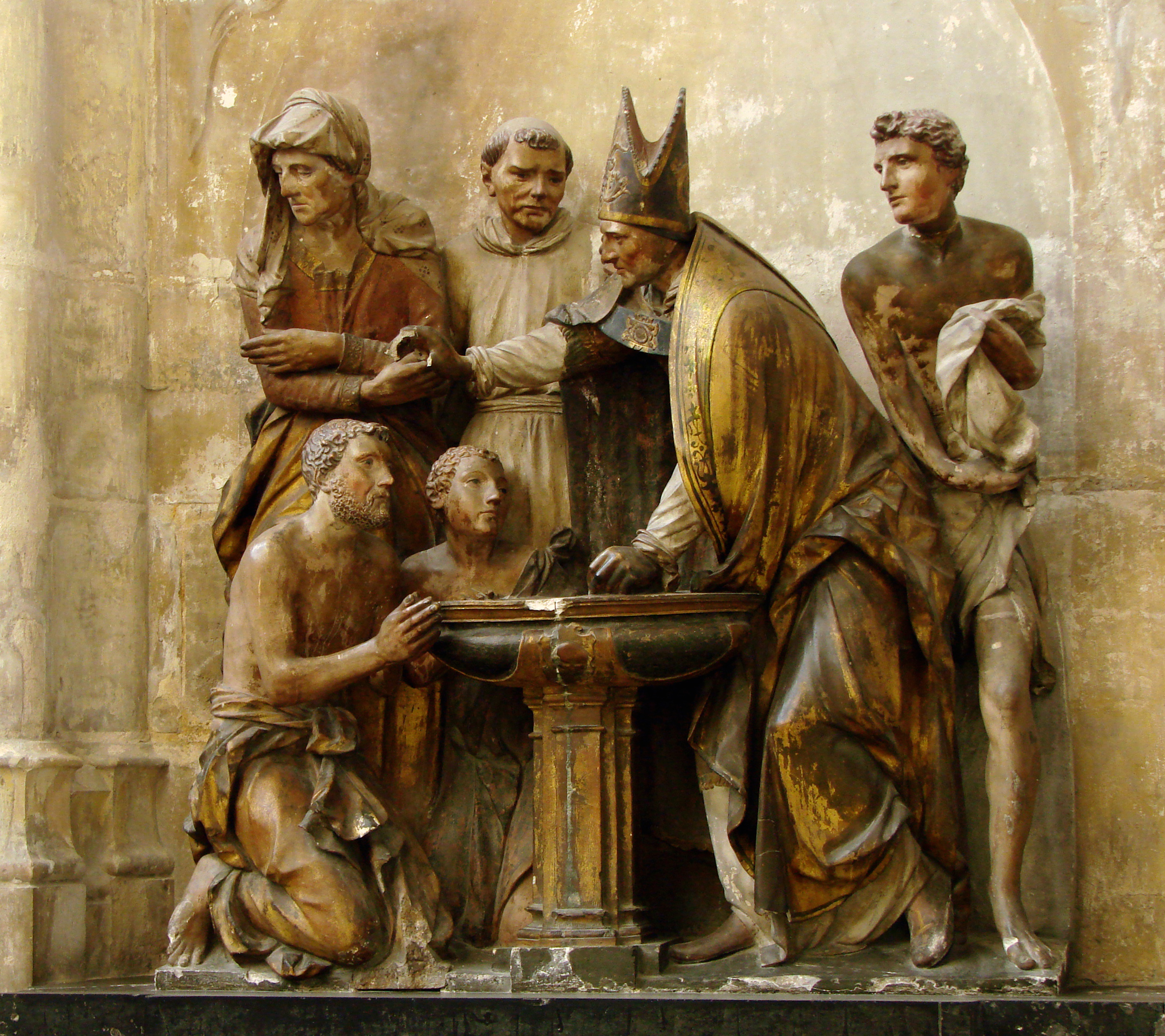
Baptism of Augustine of Hippo as represented in a sculptural group in Troyes Cathedral (1549), France

As viewed by the Catholic Church, baptism is the first of three sacraments of initiation as a Christian. It washes away all sins, both original sin and personal actual sins. It makes a person a member of the church. As a gratuitous gift of God that requires no merit on the part of the person who is baptized, it is conferred even on children, who, though they have no personal sins, need it on account of original sin.

If a new-born child is in a danger of death, anyone—be it a doctor, a nurse, or a parent—may baptize the child. Baptism marks a person permanently and cannot be repeated. The Catholic Church recognizes as valid baptisms conferred even by people who are not Catholics or Christians, provided that they intend to baptize ("to do what the Church does when she baptizes") and that they use the Trinitarian baptismal formula.

==== Confirmation ====
The Catholic Church sees the sacrament of confirmation as required to complete the grace given in baptism. When adults are baptized, confirmation is normally given immediately afterwards, a practice followed even with newly baptized infants in the Eastern Catholic Churches. In the West confirmation of children is delayed until they are old enough to understand or at the bishop's discretion. In Western Christianity, particularly Catholicism, the sacrament is called confirmation, because it confirms and strengthens the grace of baptism; in the Eastern Churches, it is called chrismation, because the essential rite is the anointing of the person with chrism, a mixture of olive oil and some perfumed substance, usually balsam, blessed by a bishop. Those who receive confirmation must be in a state of grace, which for those who have reached the age of reason means that they should first be cleansed spiritually by the sacrament of Penance; they should also have the intention of receiving the sacrament, and be prepared to show in their lives that they are Christians.

==== Eucharist ====
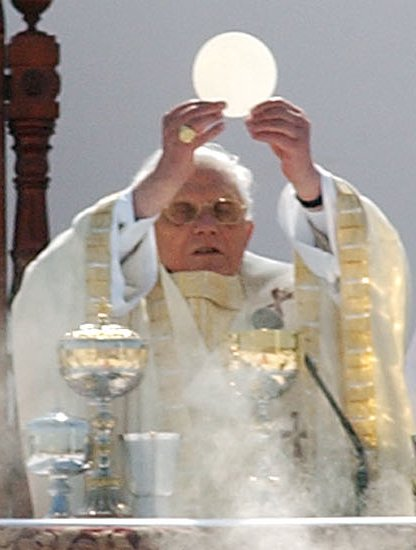
Pope Benedict XVI celebrates the Eucharist at the canonization of Frei Galvão in São Paulo, Brazil on 11 May 2007.

For Catholics, the Eucharist is the sacrament which completes Christian initiation. It is described as "the source and summit of the Christian life". The ceremony in which a Catholic first receives the Eucharist is known as First Communion.

The Eucharistic celebration, also called the Mass or Divine liturgy, includes prayers and scriptural readings, as well as an offering of bread and wine, which are brought to the altar and consecrated by the priest to become the body and the blood of Jesus Christ: the substance of bread and wine changes despite the accidents (e.g., the visible form) remaining: a change called transubstantiation.

The words of consecration reflect the words spoken by Jesus during the Last Supper, where Christ offered his body and blood to his Apostles the night before his crucifixion. The sacrament re-presents (makes present) the sacrifice of Jesus on the cross, and perpetuates it. Christ's death and resurrection give grace through the sacrament that unites the faithful with Christ and one another, remits venial sin, and aids against committing moral sin (though mortal sin itself is forgiven through the sacrament of penance).

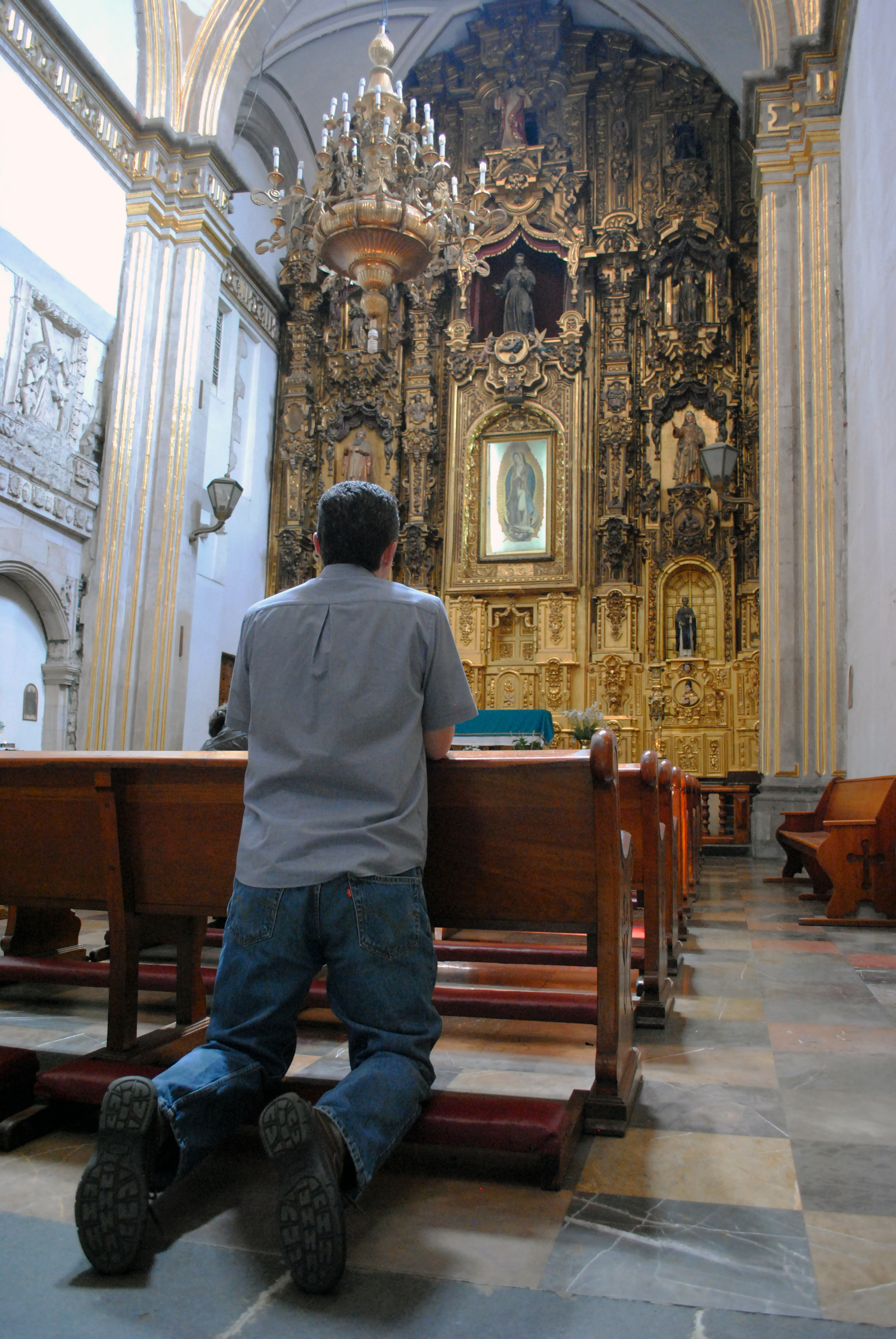
A Catholic prays in a church in Mexico.

=== Sacraments of healing ===
==== Penance ====
The sacrament of penance (also called Reconciliation, Forgiveness, Confession, and Conversion) exists for the conversion of those who, after baptism, separate themselves from Christ by sin. Essential to this sacrament are acts both by the sinner (examination of conscience, contrition with a determination not to sin again, confession to a priest, and performance of some act to repair the damage caused by sin) and by the priest (determination of the act of reparation to be performed and absolution).

Serious sins (mortal sins) should be confessed at least once a year and always before receiving the Eucharist, while confession of venial sins also is recommended. The priest is bound under the severest penalties to maintain the "seal of confession", absolute secrecy about any sins revealed to him in confession.

==== Anointing of the sick ====
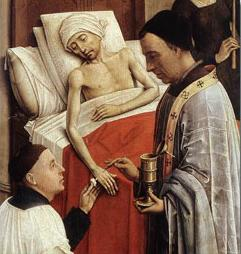
The Seven Sacraments Altarpiece triptych painting of Extreme Unction (anointing of the sick) with oil being administered by a priest during last rites. Rogier van der Weyden, 1445.

While chrism is used only for the three sacraments that cannot be repeated, a different oil is used by a priest or bishop to bless a Catholic who, because of illness or old age, has begun to be in danger of death. This sacrament, known as anointing of the sick, is believed to give comfort, peace, courage and, if the sick person is unable to make a confession, even forgiveness of sins.

The sacrament is also referred to as unction, and in the past as extreme unction, and it is one of the three sacraments that constitute the last rites, together with Penance and Viaticum (Eucharist).

=== Sacraments at the service of communion ===
According to the Catechism, there are two sacraments of communion directed towards the salvation of others: priesthood and marriage. Within the general vocation to be a Christian, these two sacraments "consecrate to specific mission or vocation among the people of God. Men receive the holy orders to feed the church by the word and grace. Spouses marry so that their love may be fortified to fulfil duties of their state".

==== Holy orders ====
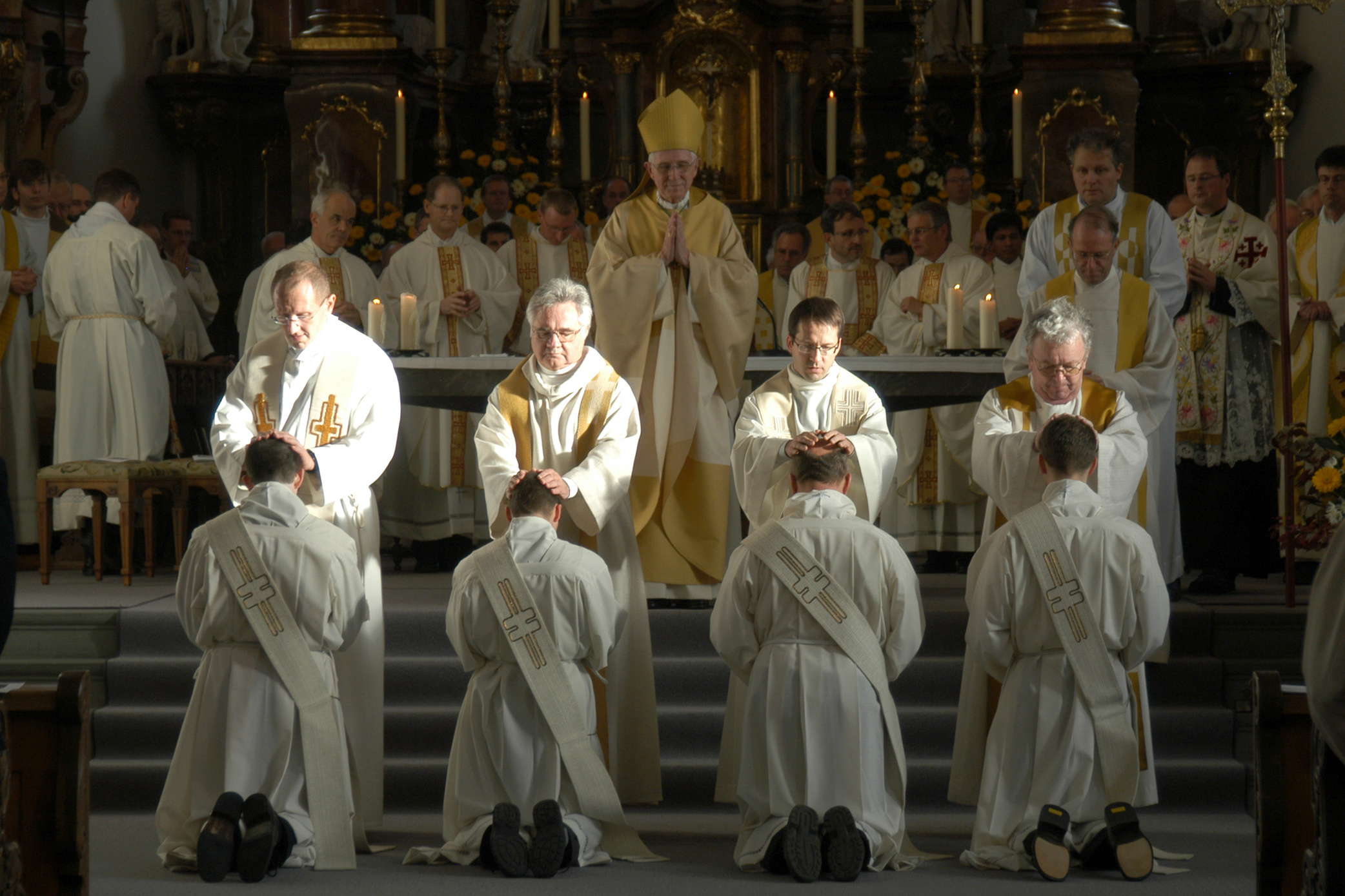
Priests lay their hands on the ordinands during the rite of ordination.

The sacrament of holy orders consecrates and deputes some Christians to serve the whole body as members of three degrees or orders: episcopate (bishops), presbyterate (priests) and diaconate (deacons). The church has defined rules on who may be ordained into the clergy. In the Latin Church the priesthood is generally restricted to celibate men, and the episcopate is always restricted to celibate men. Men who are already married may be ordained in certain Eastern Catholic churches in most countries, and the personal ordinariates and may become deacons even in the Latin Church (see clerical marriage). After becoming a Catholic priest, a man may not marry (see clerical celibacy) unless he is formally laicized.

All clergy, whether deacons, priests or bishops, may preach, teach, baptize, witness marriages and conduct funeral liturgies. Only bishops and priests can administer the sacraments of the Eucharist, reconciliation (penance) and anointing of the sick. Only bishops can administer the sacrament of Holy Orders, which ordains someone into the clergy.

==== Matrimony ====
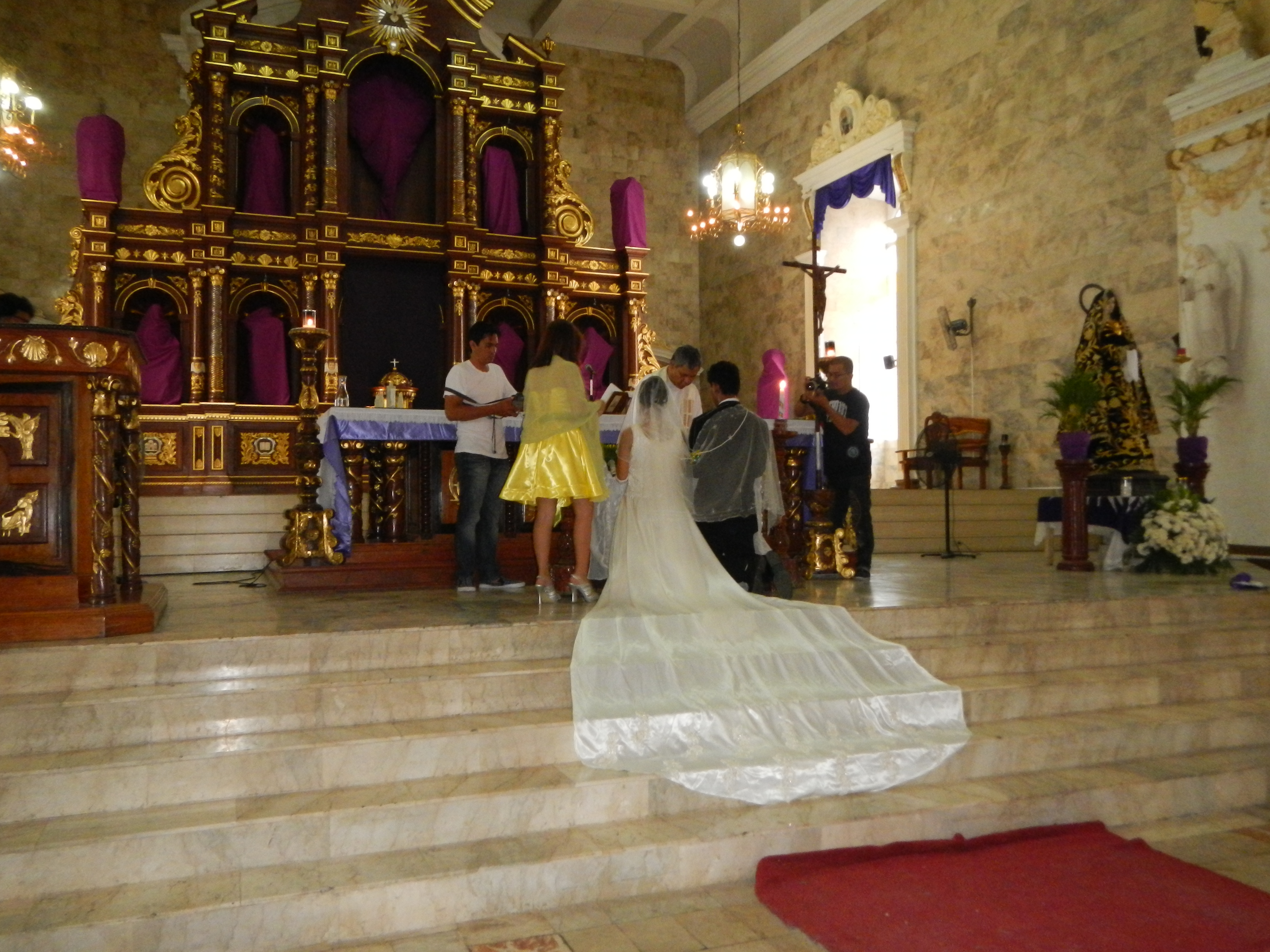
Wedding mass in the Philippines

The Catholic Church teaches that marriage is a social and spiritual bond between a man and a woman, ordered towards the good of the spouses and procreation of children; according to Catholic teachings on sexual morality, it is the only appropriate context for sexual activity. A Catholic marriage, or any marriage between baptized individuals of any Christian denomination, is viewed as a sacrament. A sacramental marriage, once consummated, cannot be dissolved except by death. (Note: Marriages involving unbaptized individuals are considered valid, but not sacramental. While sacramental marriages are insoluble, non-sacramental marriages may be dissolved under certain situations, such as a desire to marry a Catholic, under Pauline or Petrine privilege.) The church recognizes certain conditions, such as freedom of consent, as required for any marriage to be valid; In addition, the church sets specific rules and norms, known as canonical form, that Catholics must follow.

The church does not recognize divorce as ending a valid marriage and allows state-recognized divorce only as a means of protecting the property and well-being of the spouses and any children. However, consideration of particular cases by the competent ecclesiastical tribunal can lead to declaration of the invalidity of a marriage, a declaration usually referred to as an annulment. Remarriage following a divorce is not permitted unless the prior marriage was declared invalid.

== Liturgy ==
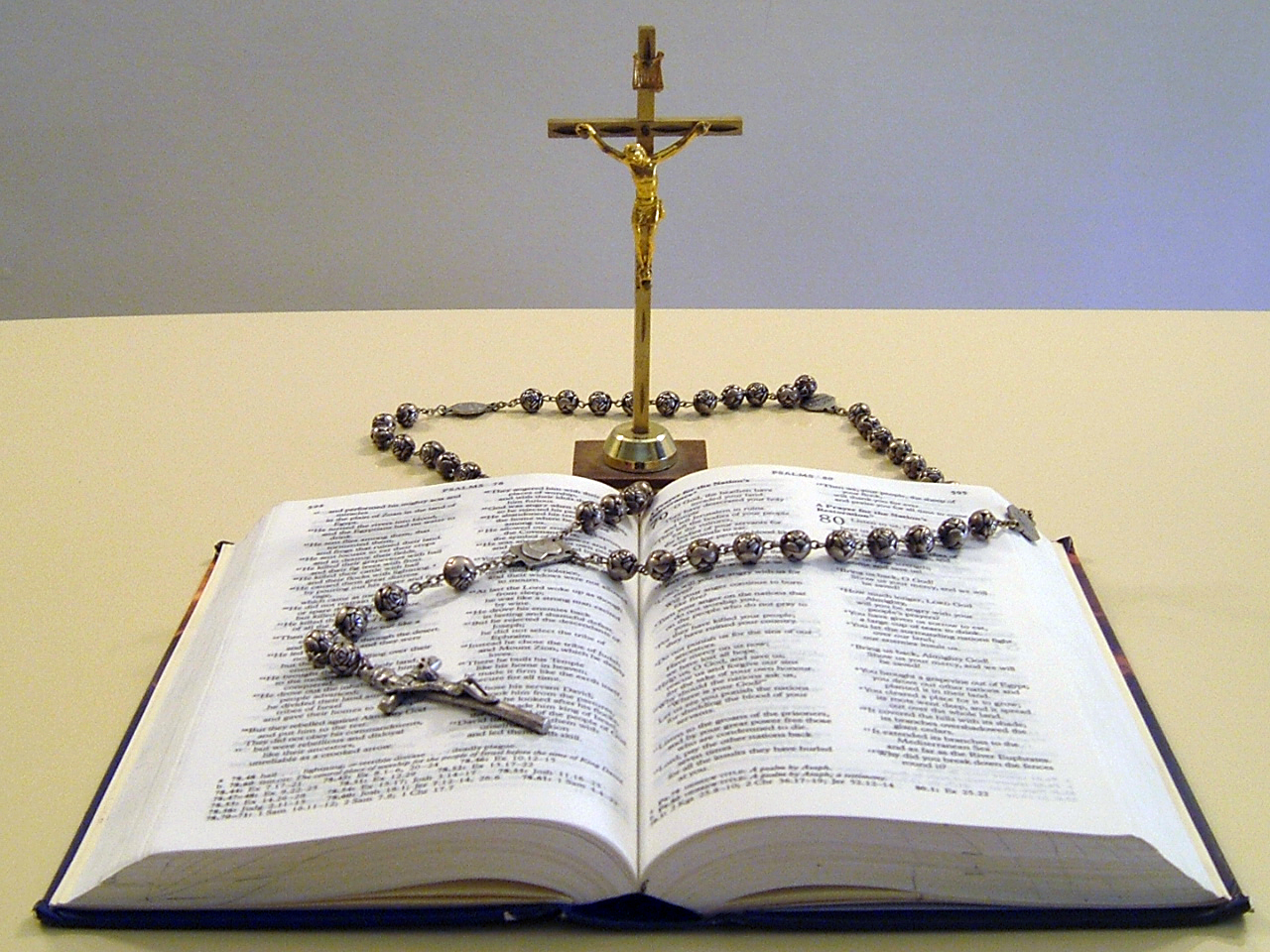
Catholic religious objects – Holy Bible, crucifix and rosary

Among the 24 autonomous (sui iuris) churches, numerous liturgical and other traditions exist, called rites, which reflect historical and cultural diversity rather than differences in belief. In the definition of the Code of Canons of the Eastern Churches, "a rite is the liturgical, theological, spiritual, and disciplinary patrimony, culture and circumstances of history of a distinct people, by which its own manner of living the faith is manifested in each Church sui iuris".

The liturgy of the sacrament of the Eucharist, called the Mass in the West and Divine Liturgy or other names in the East, is the principal liturgy of the Catholic Church. This is because it is considered the propitiatory sacrifice of Christ himself. Eastern Catholic Churches have their own rites: the liturgies of the Eucharist and the other sacraments vary from rite to rite, reflecting different theological emphases.

=== Western rites ===
The Roman Rite is the most common rite of worship used by the Catholic Church, with the Ordinary Form of the Roman Rite form of the Mass. Its use is found worldwide, originating in Rome and spreading throughout Europe, influencing and eventually supplanting local rites. The present ordinary form of Mass in the Roman Rite, found in the post-1969 editions of the Roman Missal, is usually celebrated in the local vernacular language, using an officially approved translation from the original text in Latin.

Its most widely used form was promulgated by Pope Paul VI in 1969 and revised by Pope John Paul II in 2001. In certain circumstances, the 1962 form of the Roman Rite remains authorized in the Latin Church.

Since 2014, clergy in the small personal ordinariates set up for groups of former Anglicans under the terms of the 2009 document Anglicanorum Coetibus are permitted to use a variation of the Roman Rite called "Divine Worship" or, less formally, "Ordinariate Use", which incorporates elements of the Anglican liturgy and traditions. (Note: The Divine Worship variant of the Roman Rite differs from the "Anglican Use" variant, which was introduced in 1980 for the few United States parishes established in accordance with a pastoral provision for former members of the Episcopal Church (the American branch of the Anglican Communion). Both uses adapted Anglican liturgical traditions for use within the Catholic Church.)

In the Archdiocese of Milan, with around five million Catholics the largest in Europe, Mass is celebrated according to the Ambrosian Rite. Other Latin Church rites include the Mozarabic and those of some religious institutes. These liturgical rites have an antiquity of at least 200 years before 1570, the date of Pope Pius V's Quo primum, and were thus allowed to continue.

=== Eastern rites ===
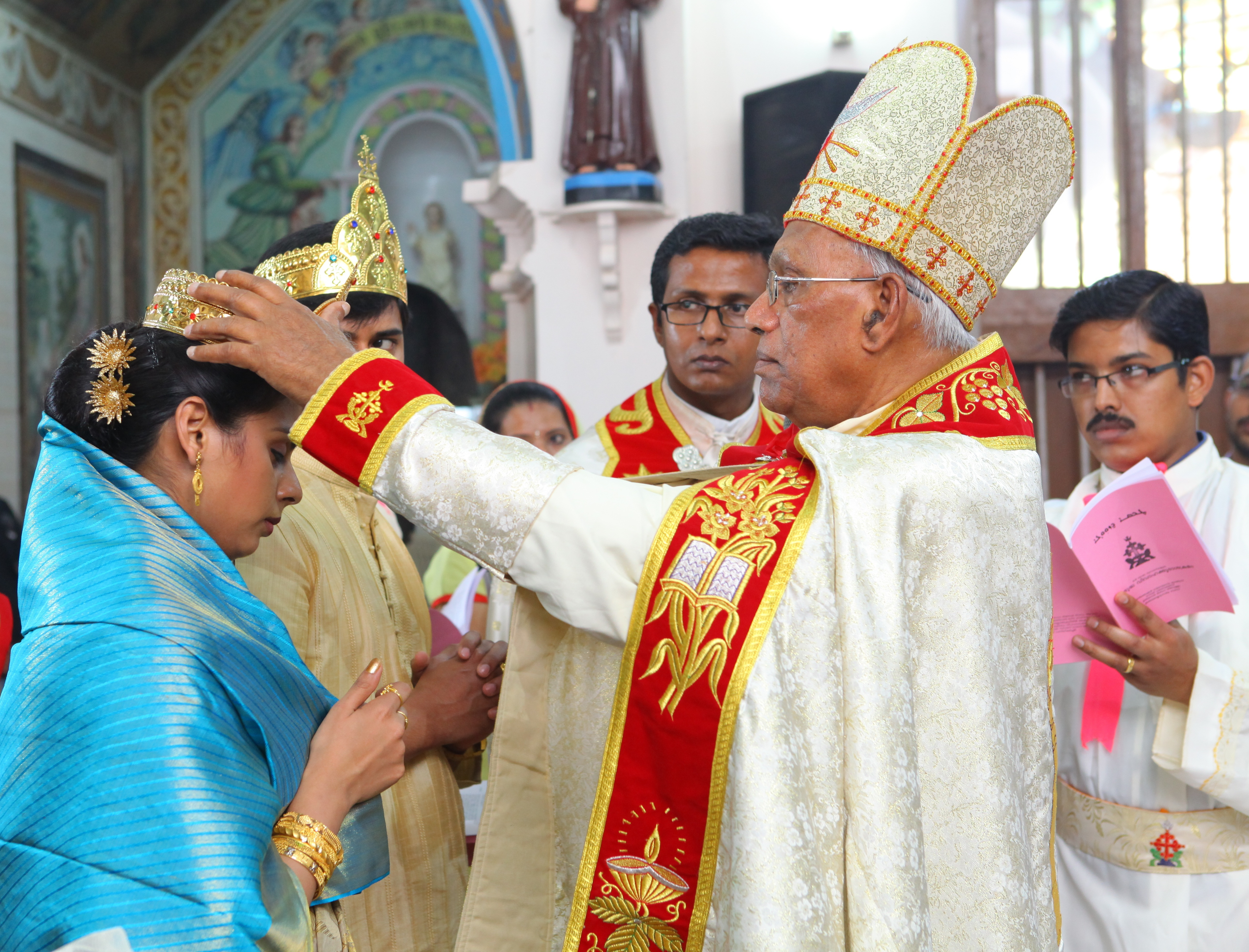
East Syrian Rite wedding crowning celebrated by a bishop of the Syro-Malabar Catholic Church in India, one of the 23 Eastern Catholic Churches in full communion with the pope and the Catholic Church

The Eastern Catholic Churches share common patrimony and liturgical rites as their counterparts, including Eastern Orthodox and other Eastern Christian churches who are no longer in communion with the Holy See. These include churches that historically developed in Russia, Caucasus, the Balkans, North Eastern Africa, India and the Middle East. The Eastern Catholic Churches are groups of faithful who have either never been out of communion with the Holy See or who have restored communion with it at the cost of breaking communion with their associates of the same tradition.

The liturgical rites of the Eastern Catholic Churches include the Byzantine Rite (in its Antiochian, Greek and Slavonic recensions), the Alexandrian Rite, the West Syrian Rite, the Armenian Rite, and the East Syriac Rite. Eastern Catholic Churches have the autonomy to set the particulars of their liturgical forms and worship, within certain limits to protect the "accurate observance" of their liturgical tradition.

In the past, some of the rites used by the Eastern Catholic Churches were subject to a degree of liturgical Latinization. In recent years Eastern Catholic Churches have returned to traditional Eastern practices in accord with the 1964 Vatican II decree Orientalium Ecclesiarum. Each church has its own liturgical calendar.

== Social, moral and cultural issues ==
=== Catholic social teaching ===
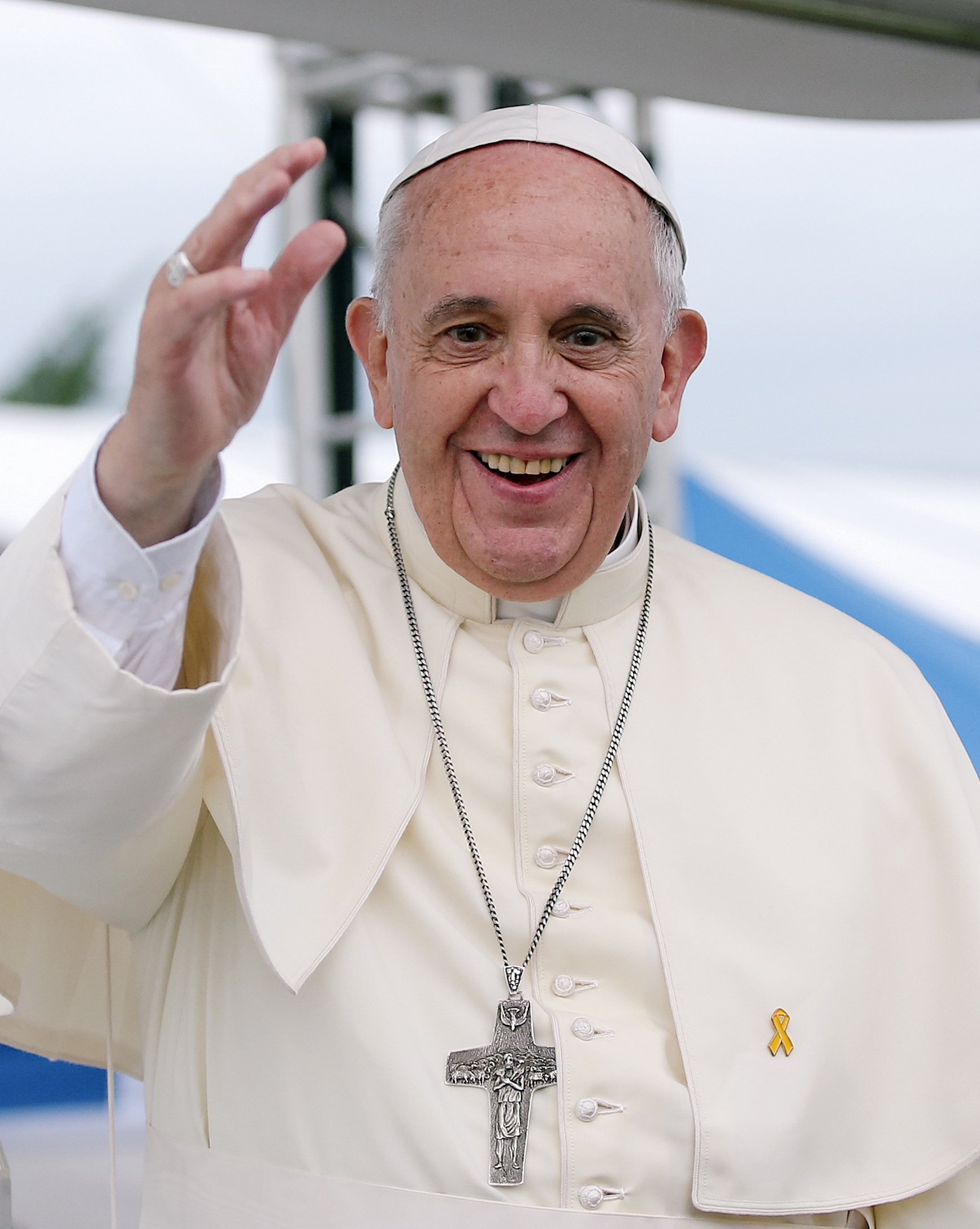
On 24 May 2015, Pope Francis issued the Laudato si', an encyclical that deals with questions such as consumerism, responsible development and environmental degradation.

Catholic social teaching, reflecting the concern Jesus showed for the impoverished, places a heavy emphasis on the corporal works of mercy and the spiritual works of mercy, namely the support and concern for the sick, the poor and the afflicted. Church teaching calls for a preferential option for the poor while canon law prescribes that "The Christian faithful are also obliged to promote social justice and, mindful of the precept of the Lord, to assist the poor." Its foundations are widely considered to have been laid by Pope Leo XIII's 1891 encyclical letter Rerum novarum which upholds the rights and dignity of labour and the right of workers to form unions.

=== Social services ===
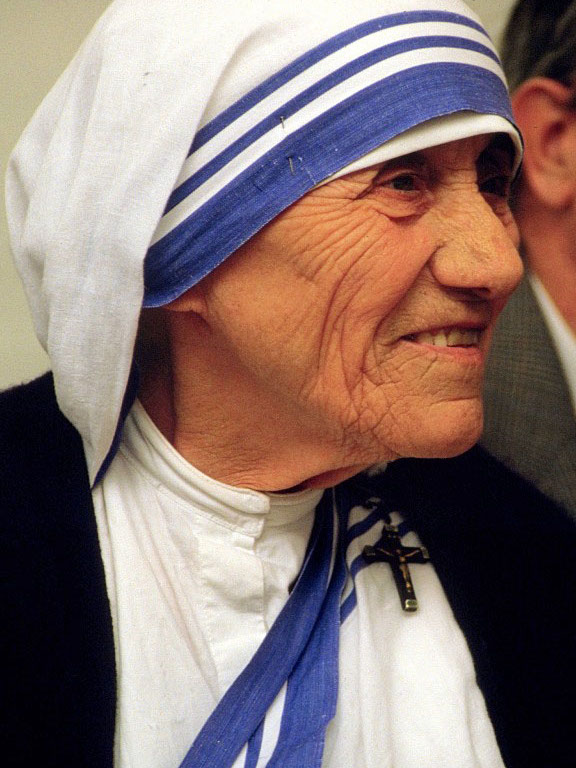
Saint Teresa of Calcutta advocated for the sick, the poor and the needy by practising the acts of corporal works of mercy. She was awarded the Nobel Peace Prize in 1979.

The Catholic Church is the largest non-government provider of education and medical services in the world. In 2010 the Catholic Church's Pontifical Council for Pastoral Assistance to Health Care Workers said that the church manages 26% of health care facilities in the world, including hospitals, clinics, orphanages, pharmacies and centres for those with leprosy.

The church has always been involved in education, since the founding of the first universities of Europe. It runs and sponsors thousands of primary and secondary schools, colleges and universities throughout the world and operates the world's largest non-governmental school system.

Religious institutes for women have played a particularly prominent role in the provision of health and education services, as with orders such as the Sisters of Mercy, Little Sisters of the Poor, the Missionaries of Charity, the Sisters of St. Joseph of the Sacred Heart, the Sisters of the Blessed Sacrament and the Daughters of Charity of Saint Vincent de Paul. The Catholic nun Mother Teresa of Calcutta, India, founder of the Missionaries of Charity, was awarded the Nobel Peace Prize in 1979 for her humanitarian work among India's poor. Bishop Carlos Filipe Ximenes Belo won the same award in 1996 for "work towards a just and peaceful solution to the conflict in East Timor".

The church is also actively engaged in international aid and development through organizations such as Catholic Relief Services, Caritas Internationalis, Aid to the Church in Need, refugee advocacy groups such as the Jesuit Refugee Service and community aid groups such as the Saint Vincent de Paul Society.

=== Sexual morality ===
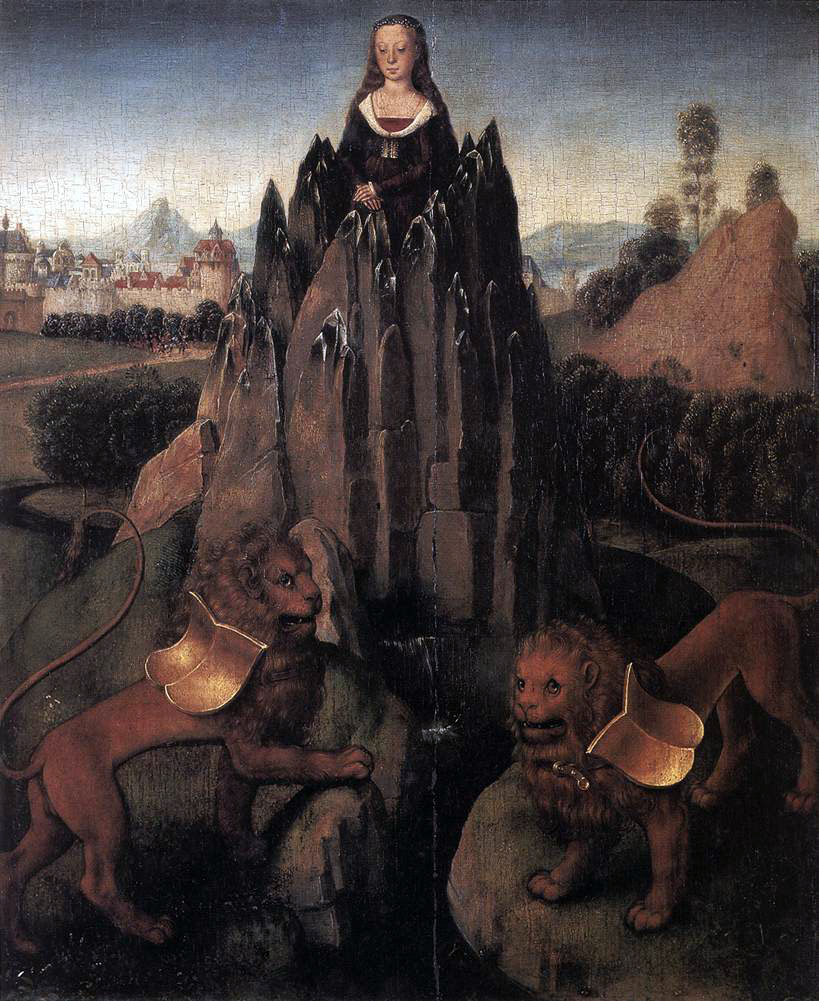
An allegory of chastity by Hans Memling

==== Chastity and marriage ====
In the church's teaching, sexual activity should be reserved to married couples without artificial birth control. Marriage is considered the only appropriate context for sexual activity, whether in a sacramental marriage among Christians or in a natural marriage where one or both spouses are unbaptized. Even in romantic relationships, including engagement to marriage, partners are called to abstain from sexual activity, in order to test mutual respect and fidelity.

Chastity in marriage requires, in particular, conjugal fidelity and protecting the fecundity of marriage. The couple must foster trust and honesty as well as spiritual and physical intimacy. Sexual activity must always be open to the transmission of new life; the church calls this the procreative significance. It must likewise always bring a couple together in love; the church calls this the unitive significance. Artificial contraception and certain other sexual practices are not permitted, although natural family planning methods are permitted to provide healthy spacing between births, or to postpone children for a just reason.

Church teachings about sexuality have become an issue of increasing controversy in the Western world, especially after the close of the Second Vatican Council in the 1960s, due to changing cultural attitudes described as the sexual revolution. Pope Francis said in 2015 that he was worried that the church has grown "obsessed" with issues such as abortion, same-sex marriage and contraception, and for prioritizing moral doctrines over helping the poor and marginalized.

==== Homosexuality ====
The Catholic Church teaches that "homosexual acts" are "contrary to the natural law", "acts of grave depravity" and "under no circumstances can they be approved", but that persons experiencing homosexual tendencies must be accorded respect and dignity. According to the Catechism of the Catholic Church,

The number of men and women who have deep-seated homosexual tendencies is not negligible. This inclination, which is objectively disordered, constitutes for most of them a trial. They must be accepted with respect, compassion, and sensitivity. Every sign of unjust discrimination in their regard should be avoided... Homosexual persons are called to chastity. By the virtues of self-mastery that teach them inner freedom, at times by the support of disinterested friendship, by prayer and sacramental grace, they can and should gradually and resolutely approach Christian perfection. (Note: This part of the Catechism was quoted by Pope Francis in a 2013 press interview in which he remarked, when asked about an individual: "I think that when you encounter a person like this [the individual he was asked about], you must make a distinction between the fact of a person being gay from the fact of being a lobby, because lobbies, all are not good. That is bad. If a person is gay and seeks the Lord and has good will, well who am I to judge them?" This remark and others made in the same interview were seen as a change in the tone, but not in the substance of the teaching of the church, which includes opposition to same-sex marriage.)

Orthodox Catholic groups, such as Building Catholic Futures, encourage parishes to incorporate celibate gay people into the church communities. Certain dissenting Catholic groups, such as DignityUSA, oppose the position of the Catholic Church on homosexuality and seek to change it and to educate Catholics on LGBT issues. The Catholic Church has banned all such groups from church property.

==== Divorce and declarations of nullity ====
Canon law makes no provision for divorce between baptized individuals, as a valid, consummated sacramental marriage is considered to be a lifelong bond. However, a declaration of nullity may be granted when the proof is produced that essential conditions for contracting a valid marriage were absent from the beginning—in other words, that the marriage was not valid due to some impediment. A declaration of nullity, commonly called an annulment, is a judgement on the part of an ecclesiastical tribunal determining that a marriage was invalidly attempted.

Marriages among unbaptized individuals may be dissolved with papal permission under certain situations, such as a desire to marry a Catholic, under Pauline or Petrine privilege. An attempt at remarriage following divorce without a declaration of nullity places "the remarried spouse ... in a situation of public and permanent adultery". An innocent spouse who lives in continence following divorce, or couples who live in continence following a civil divorce for a grave cause, do not sin.

Worldwide, diocesan tribunals completed over 49000 cases for nullity of marriage in 2006. Over the past 30 years about 55 to 70% of annulments have occurred in the United States. The growth in annulments has been substantial; in the United States, 27,000 marriages were annulled in 2006, compared to 338 in 1968. However, approximately 200,000 married Catholics in the United States divorce each year; 10 million total as of 2006. (Note: With regard to divorce in the United States, according to the Barna Group, among all who have been married, 33% have been divorced at least once; among American Catholics, 28% (the study did not track religious annulments).) Divorce is increasing in some predominantly Catholic countries in Europe.

==== Contraception and abortion ====
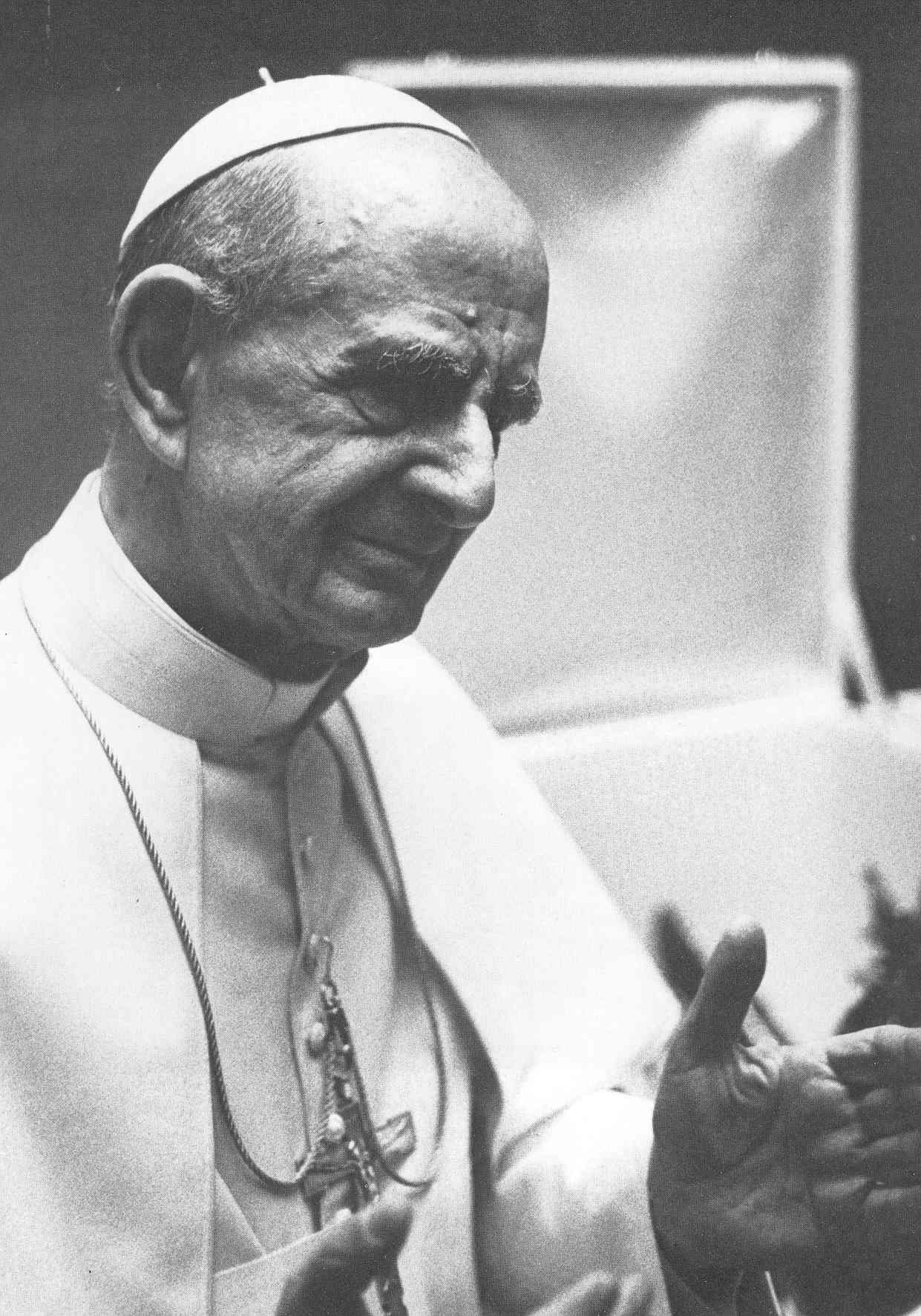
Pope Paul VI issued Humanae vitae on 25 July 1968.

The church teaches that sexual intercourse should only take place between a man and woman who are married to each other, and should be without the use of birth control or contraception. In his encyclical Humanae vitae (1968) Pope Paul VI firmly rejected all artificial contraception, thus contradicting dissenters in the church who saw the birth control pill as an ethically justifiable method of contraception, though he permitted the regulation of births by means of natural family planning (NFP.) This teaching was continued especially by John Paul II in his encyclical Evangelium Vitae, where he clarified the church's position on artificial contraception, abortion and euthanasia by condemning them as part of a "culture of death" and calling instead for a "culture of life".

Many Western Catholics have voiced significant disagreement with the church's teaching on contraception. Overturning the church's teaching on this point features high on progressive agendas. Catholics for Choice, a political lobbyist group that is not associated with the Catholic Church, stated in 1998 that 96% of American Catholic women had used contraceptives at some point in their lives and that 72% of Catholics believed that one could be a good Catholic without obeying the church's teaching on birth control. Use of natural family planning methods among United States Catholics purportedly is low, although the number cannot be known with certainty. (Note: Regarding use of natural family planning, in 2002, 24% of the U.S. population identified as Catholic, but according to a 2002 study by the Centers for Disease Control and Prevention, of sexually active Americans avoiding pregnancy, only 1.5% were using NFP.) As Catholic health providers are among the largest providers of services to patients with HIV/AIDS worldwide, there is significant controversy within and outside the church regarding the use of condoms as a means of limiting new infections, as condom use ordinarily constitutes prohibited contraceptive use.

Similarly, the Catholic Church opposes artificial insemination regardless of whether it is homologous (from the husband) or heterologous (from a donor) and in vitro fertilization (IVF), saying that the artificial process replaces the love and conjugal act between a husband and wife. In addition, it opposes IVF because it might cause disposal of embryos; Catholics believe an embryo is an individual with a soul who must be treated as such. For this reason, the church also opposes abortion.

The Catholic Church oppose all forms of abortion procedures whose direct purpose is to destroy a zygote, blastocyst, embryo or fetus, since it holds that "human life must be respected and protected absolutely from the moment of conception. From the first moment of his existence, a human being must be recognized as having the rights of a person – among which is the inviolable right of every innocent being to life". However, the church does recognize as morally legitimate certain acts which indirectly result in the death of the fetus. The 1983 Code of Canon Law imposes automatic (latae sententiae) excommunication on Latin Catholics who actually procure an abortion, if they fulfill the conditions for being subject to such a sanction.

Due to the anti-abortion stance, some Catholics oppose receiving vaccines derived from fetal cells obtained via abortion. On 21 December 2020, and regarding COVID-19 vaccination, the Congregation for the Doctrine of the Faith emitted a document stating that "it is morally acceptable to receive Covid-19 vaccines that have used cell lines from aborted fetuses in their research and production process" when no alternative vaccine is available, since "the moral duty to avoid such passive material cooperation is not obligatory if there is a grave danger, such as the otherwise uncontainable spread of a serious pathological agent." The document states that receiving the vaccine does not constitute endorsement of the practice of abortion, and that "the morality of vaccination depends not only on the duty to protect one's own health, but also on the duty to pursue the common good." The document says further:

Those who, however, for reasons of conscience, refuse vaccines produced with cell lines from aborted fetuses, must do their utmost to avoid, by other prophylactic means and appropriate behavior, becoming vehicles for the transmission of the infectious agent. In particular, they must avoid any risk to the health of those who cannot be vaccinated for medical or other reasons, and who are the most vulnerable.

=== Death penalty and euthanasia ===
The Catholic Church is committed to the worldwide abolition of the death penalty in any circumstance. The current Catechism of the Catholic Church teaches that "in the light of the Gospel" the death penalty is "inadmissible because it is an attack on the inviolability and dignity of the person" and that the Catholic Church "works with determination for its abolition worldwide." In his 2020 encyclical Fratelli tutti, Francis repeated that the death penalty is "inadmissible" and that "there can be no stepping back from this position". On 9 January 2022 Pope Francis stated in his annual speech to Vatican ambassadors: "The death penalty cannot be employed for a purported state justice, since it does not constitute a deterrent nor render justice to victims, but only fuels the thirst for vengeance".

There is controversy about whether the Catholic Church considers the death penalty intrinsically evil. The American Archbishop José Horacio Gómez and the Catholic philosopher Edward Feser argue that this is a matter of prudential judgement and that the church does not teach this as a de fide statement; others, such as Cardinals Charles Maung Bo and Rino Fisichella, state that it does.

The Catholic Church opposes active euthanasia and physician-assisted suicide on the grounds that life is a gift from God and should not be prematurely shortened. However, the church allows dying people to refuse extraordinary treatments that would minimally prolong life without hope of recovery.

=== Holy orders and women ===
Women and men religious engage in a variety of occupations such as contemplative prayer, teaching, providing health care, and working as missionaries. Catholic women have played diverse roles in the life of the church, with religious institutes providing a formal space for their participation and convents providing spaces for their self-government, prayer and influence through many centuries. Religious sisters and nuns have been extensively involved in developing and running the church's worldwide health and education service networks.

Holy Orders are reserved for men. Efforts in support of the ordination of women to the priesthood led to several rulings by the Roman Curia or popes against the proposal, as in Declaration on the Question of the Admission of Women to the Ministerial Priesthood (1976), Mulieris Dignitatem (1988) and Ordinatio sacerdotalis (1994). According to the latest ruling, found in Ordinatio sacerdotalis, Pope John Paul II affirmed that the Catholic Church "does not consider herself authorised to admit women to priestly ordination".

In defiance of these rulings, independent opposition groups such as Roman Catholic Womenpriests have performed ceremonies they affirm as sacramental ordinations, with, reputedly, an ordaining male Catholic bishop in the first few instances, which, according to canon law, are both illicit and invalid and considered simulations of the sacrament of ordination. (Note: According to Roman Catholic Womanpriests: "The principal consecrating Roman Catholic male bishop who ordained our first women bishops is a bishop with apostolic succession within the Roman Catholic Church in full communion with the pope.") The Congregation for the Doctrine of the Faith responded by issuing a statement clarifying that any Catholic bishops involved in ordination ceremonies for women, as well as the women themselves if they were Catholic, would automatically receive the penalty of excommunication (latae sententiae, literally "with the sentence already applied", i.e. automatically), citing canon 1378 of canon law and other church laws.

=== Sexual abuse cases ===
From the 1990s the issue of sexual abuse of minors by Catholic clergy and other church members has become the subject of civil litigation, criminal prosecution, media coverage and public debate in countries around the world. Many Catholic bishops and other officials had protected priests accused of sexual abuse, and transferred them to other assignments elsewhere, where they continued to commit sex crimes against children. There has been resultant extensive public criticism of the church.

In response to the scandals, formal procedures have been established to help prevent abuse, encourage the reporting of any abuse that occurs and to handle such reports promptly, although groups representing victims have disputed their effectiveness. In 2014, Pope Francis instituted the Pontifical Commission for the Protection of Minors for the safeguarding of minors.

=== Environmental ===
The church has also addressed stewardship of the natural environment, and its relationship to other social and theological teachings. In the document Laudato si', dated 24 May 2015, Pope Francis critiques consumerism and irresponsible development, and laments environmental degradation and climate change. The pope expressed concern that the warming of the planet is a symptom of a greater problem: the developed world's indifference to the destruction of the planet as humans pursue short-term economic gains.

== See also ==
- Catholic Church and politics
- Catholic Church and race
- Catholic art
- Catholic culture
- Catholic peace traditions
- Glossary of the Catholic Church
- Index of Catholic Church articles
- Index of Vatican City-related articles
- List of Catholic religious institutes
- Liturgical year of the Catholic Church
- Lists of Catholics
- List of popes
- Role of Christianity in civilization
- Society of Jesus

== Bibliography ==
- Asci, Donald P. (2002) The Conjugal Act as Personal Act. A Study of the Catholic Concept of the Conjugal Act in the Light of Christian anthropology, San Francisco: Ignatius Press. ISBN 0-89870-844-3
- "Canon 42". 1983 Code of Canon Law. Vatican. Archived from the original on 20 February 2008.
- "Catechism of the Catholic Church". Libreria Editrice Vaticana. 1994. Archived from the original on 6 February 2012.
- Barry, Rev. Msgr. John F. (2001). One Faith, One Lord: A Study of Basic Catholic Belief. Gerard F. Baumbach, Ed.D. ISBN 0-8215-2207-8.
- Bauer, Susan Wise (2010). The History of Medieval World: From the Conversion of Constantine to the First Crusade. Norton. ISBN 978-0-393-05975-5.
- Baumgartner, Frederic J. (2003). Behind Locked Doors: A History of the Papal Elections. Palgrave Macmillan. ISBN 0-312-29463-8.
- Bethell, Leslie (1984). The Cambridge History of Latin America. Cambridge University Press. ISBN 0-521-23225-2.
- Bokenkotter, Thomas (2004). A Concise History of the Catholic Church. Doubleday. ISBN 0-385-50584-1.
- Bunson, Matthew (2008). Our Sunday Visitor's Catholic Almanac. Our Sunday Visitor Publishing. ISBN 1-59276-441-X.
- Bruni, Frank; Burkett, Elinor (2002). A Gospel of Shame: Children, Sexual Abuse and the Catholic Church. Harper Perennial. p. 336. ISBN 978-0-06-052232-2.
- Chadwick, Owen (1995). A History of Christianity. Barnes & Noble. ISBN 0-7607-7332-7.
- Clarke, Graeme (2005), "Third-Century Christianity", in Bowman, Alan K., Peter Garnsey and Averil Cameron. The Cambridge Ancient History 2nd ed., volume 12: The Crisis of Empire, A.D. 193–337, Cambridge University Press, pp. 589–671. ISBN 978-0-521-30199-2.
- Collinge, William J. Historical dictionary of Catholicism (1997) online free.
- Collins, Michael; Price, Mathew A. (1999). The Story of Christianity. Dorling Kindersley. ISBN 0-7513-0467-0.
- Coriden, James A.; Green, Thomas J.; Heintschel, Donald E. (1985). The Code of Canon Law: A Text and Commentary, Study Edition. Paulist Press. ISBN 978-0-8091-2837-2.
- Davidson, Ivor (2005). The Birth of the Church. Monarch. ISBN 1-85424-658-5.
- Della Rocca, Fernando (1 January 1959). Manual of Canon Law. Bruce Pub. Co.
- Derrick, Christopher (1967). Trimming the Ark: Catholic Attitudes and the Cult of Change. New York: P.J. Kennedy & Sons. ISBN 978-0-09-096850-3.
- Duffy, Eamon (1997). Saints and Sinners, a History of the Popes. Yale University Press. ISBN 0-300-07332-1.
- Dowbiggin, Ian (2003). A Merciful End: The Euthanasia Movement in Modern America. Oxford: Oxford University Press. pp. 182–183. ISBN 978-0-19-515443-6.
- Dussel, Enrique (1981). A History of the Church in Latin America. Wm. B. Eerdmans. ISBN 0-8028-2131-6.
- Fahlbusch, Erwin (2007). The Encyclopedia of Christianity. Wm. B. Eerdmans. ISBN 0-8028-2415-3.
- Froehle, Bryan; Mary Gautier (2003). Global Catholicism, Portrait of a World Church. Orbis books; Center for Applied Research in the Apostolate, Georgetown University. ISBN 1-57075-375-X.
- Gale Group. (2002) New Catholic Encyclopedia, 15 vol, with annual supplements; highly detailed coverage.
- Hastings, Adrian (2004). The Church in Africa 1450–1950. Oxford University Press. ISBN 0-19-826399-6.
- Herring, George (2006). An Introduction to the History of Christianity. Continuum International. ISBN 0-8264-6737-7.
- Koschorke, Klaus; Ludwig, Frieder; Delgado, Mariano (2007). A History of Christianity in Asia, Africa, and Latin America, 1450–1990. Wm B. Eerdmans Publishing Co. ISBN 978-0-8028-2889-7.
- Kreeft, Peter (2001). Catholic Christianity. Ignatius Press. ISBN 0-89870-798-6.
- Latourette, by Kenneth Scott. Christianity in a Revolutionary Age: A History of Christianity in the 19th and 20th centuries (5 vol. 1969); detailed coverage of Catholicism in every major country.
- Ulrich L. Lehner, (2016) The Catholic Enlightenment. The Forgotten History of a Global Movement. ISBN 978-0-19-023291-7
- Leith, John (1963). Creeds of the Churches. Aldine Publishing Co. ISBN 0-664-24057-7.
- MacCulloch, Diarmaid (2010). Christianity: The First Three Thousand Years. Viking. ISBN 978-0-670-02126-0. originally published 2009 by Allen Lane, as A History of Christianity
- MacCulloch, Diarmaid (2003). The Reformation. Viking. ISBN 0-670-03296-4.
- MacMullen, Ramsay (1984), Christianising the Roman Empire: (A.D. 100–400). New Haven, CT: Yale University Press. ISBN 978-0-585-38120-6
- Marthaler, Berard (1994). Introducing the Catechism of the Catholic Church, Traditional Themes and Contemporary Issues. Paulist Press. ISBN 0-8091-3495-0.
- McBrien, Richard and Harold Attridge, eds. (1995) The HarperCollins Encyclopedia of Catholicism. HarperCollins. ISBN 978-0-06-065338-5.
- McManners, John, ed. The Oxford Illustrated History of Christianity. (Oxford University Press 1990). ISBN 0-19-822928-3.
- Norman, Edward (2007). The Roman Catholic Church, An Illustrated History. University of California Press. ISBN 978-0-520-25251-6.
- O'Collins, Gerald; Farrugia, Maria (2003). Catholicism: The Story of Catholic Christianity Oxford University Press. ISBN 978-0-19-925995-3.
- Perreau-Saussine, Emile (2012). Catholicism and Democracy: An Essay in the History of Political Thought. ISBN 978-0-691-15394-0.
- Phayer, Michael (2000). The Catholic Church and the Holocaust, 1930–1965. Indiana University Press. ISBN 0-253-33725-9.
- Pollard, John Francis (2005). Money and the Rise of the Modern Papacy, 1850–1950. Cambridge University Press. ISBN 978-0-521-81204-7.
- Rhodes, Anthony (1973). The Vatican in the Age of the Dictators (1922–1945). Holt, Rinehart and Winston. ISBN 0-03-007736-2.
- Riley-Smith, Jonathan (1997). The First Crusaders. Cambridge University Press. ISBN 978-0-511-00308-0.
- Schreck, Alan (1999). The Essential Catholic Catechism.Servant Publications. ISBN 1-56955-128-6.
- Schwaller, John Frederick. (2011) The history of the Catholic Church in Latin America: from conquest to revolution and beyond (NYU Press).
- Smith, Janet, ed. (1993) Why "Humanae Vitae" Was Right, San Francisco: Ignatius Press.
- Smith, Janet. (1991) "'Humanae Vitae,' a Generation Later", Washington, DC: Catholic University of America Press.
- Stewart, Cynthia. (2008) The Catholic Church: A Brief Popular History 337 pp.
- Vatican, Central Statistics Office (2007). Annuario Pontificio (Pontifical Yearbook). Libreria Editrice Vaticana. ISBN 978-88-209-7908-9.
- Vidmar, John (2005). The Catholic Church Through the Ages. Paulist Press. ISBN 0-8091-4234-1.
- Wilken, Robert (2004). "Christianity". in Hitchcock, Susan Tyler; Esposito, John. Geography of Religion. National Geographic Society. ISBN 0-7922-7317-6.
