= Marriage in the Catholic Church =

Sacrament and social institution within the Catholic Church

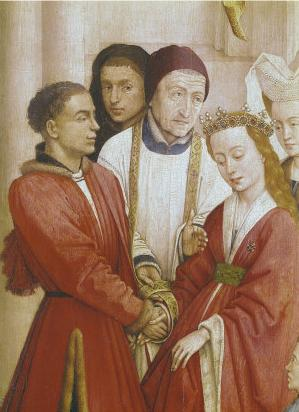
Matrimony, The Seven Sacraments, Rogier van der Weyden, c. 1445

Marriage in the Catholic Church, also known as Holy Matrimony, is the "covenant by which a man and woman establish between themselves a partnership of the whole of life and which is ordered by its nature to the good of the spouses and the procreation and education of offspring", and which "has been raised by Christ the Lord to the dignity of a sacrament between the baptized". Catholic matrimonial law, based on Roman law regarding its focus on marriage as a free mutual agreement or contract, became the basis for the marriage law of all European countries, at least up to the Reformation.

The Catholic Church recognizes as a sacrament, (1) the marriages between two baptized non-Catholic Christians, as well as (2) marriages between baptized non-Catholic Christians and Catholic Christians, although in the latter case, consent from the diocesan bishop must be obtained, with this termed "dispensation to enter into a mixed marriage". To illustrate (1), for example, "if two Lutherans marry in the Lutheran Church in the presence of a Lutheran minister, the Catholic Church recognizes this as a valid sacrament of marriage". On the other hand, although the Catholic Church recognizes marriages between two non-Christians or those between a Catholic Christian and a non-Christian, these are not considered to be sacramental, and in the latter case, the Catholic Christian must seek permission from his/her bishop for the marriage to occur; this permission is known as "dispensation from disparity of cult".

Weddings in which both parties are Catholic faithful are ordinarily held in a Catholic church, while weddings in which one party is a Catholic faithful and the other party is a non-Catholic can be held in a Catholic church or a non-Catholic church, but in the latter case permission of one's Bishop or ordinary is required for the marriage to be free of defect of form.

== Catholic Church view of the importance of marriage ==
The Catechism of the Catholic Church states: "The intimate community of life and love which constitutes the married state has been established by the Creator and endowed by him with its own proper laws. . . . God himself is the author of marriage. The vocation to marriage is written in the very nature of man and woman as they came from the hand of the Creator. Marriage is not a purely human institution despite the many variations it may have undergone through the centuries in different cultures, social structures, and spiritual attitudes. These differences should not cause us to forget its common and permanent characteristics. Although the dignity of this institution is not transparent everywhere with the same clarity, some sense of the greatness of the matrimonial union exists in all cultures. The well-being of the individual person and of both human and Christian society is closely bound up with the healthy state of conjugal and family life".

It also says: "The Church attaches great importance to Jesus' presence at the wedding at Cana. She sees in it the confirmation of the goodness of marriage and the proclamation that thenceforth marriage will be an efficacious sign of Christ's presence. In his preaching Jesus unequivocally taught the original meaning of the union of man and woman as the Creator willed it from the beginning: permission given by Moses to divorce one's wife was a concession to the hardness of hearts. The matrimonial union of man and woman is indissoluble; God himself has determined it, 'what therefore God has joined together, let no man put asunder'. This unequivocal insistence on the indissolubility of the marriage bond may have left some perplexed and could seem to be a demand impossible to realize. However, Jesus has not placed on spouses a burden impossible to bear, or too heavy – heavier than the Law of Moses. By coming to restore the original order of creation disturbed by sin, he himself gives the strength and grace to live marriage in the new dimension of the Reign of God".

== History of marriage in the Catholic Church ==
=== Early period ===
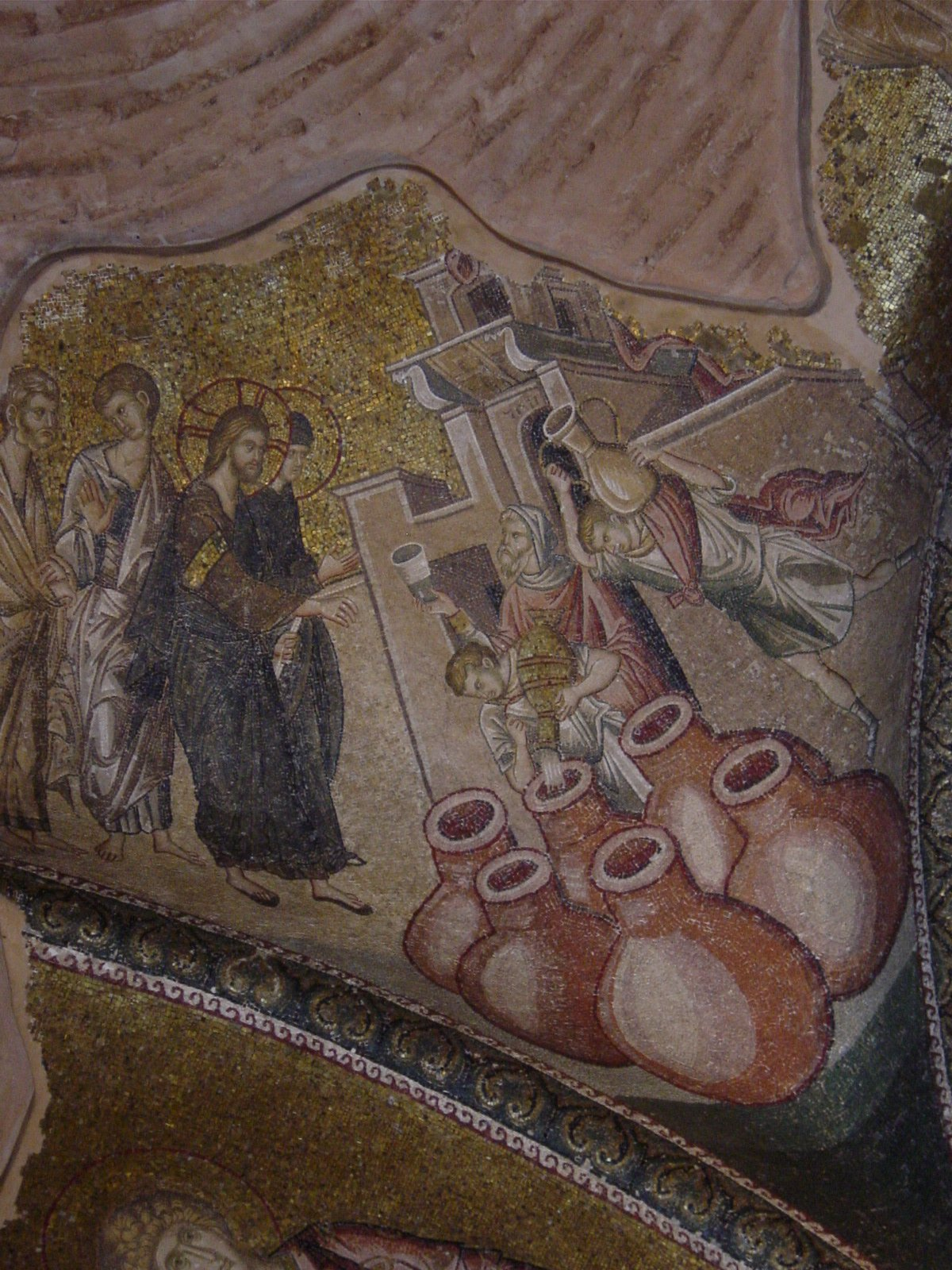
Mosaic depicting the wedding feast in Cana

Marriage was considered a necessary passage into adulthood, and strongly supported within the Jewish faith. The author of the letter to the Hebrews declared that marriage should be held in honor among all, and early Christians defended the holiness of marriage against the Gnostics and the Antinomians.

At the same time, some in the emerging Christian communities began to prize the celibate state higher than marriage, taking the model of Jesus as a guide. This was related to a widespread belief about the imminent coming of the Kingdom of God; and thus the exhortation by Jesus to avoid earthly ties. The apostle Paul in his letters also suggested a preference for celibacy, but recognized that not all Christians necessarily had the ability to live such a life: "Now as a concession, not a command, I say this. I wish that all were as I myself am. But each has his own gift from God, one of one kind and one of another. To the unmarried and the widows I say that it is good for them to remain single as I am. But if they cannot exercise self-control, they should marry. For it is better to marry than to burn with passion". This teaching suggested that marriage be used only as a last resort by those Christians who found it too difficult to exercise a level of self-control and remain abstinent, not having the gift of celibacy. Armstrong has argued that to a significant degree, early Christians "placed less value on the family" and saw celibacy and freedom from family ties as a preferable state for those capable of it. Nevertheless, this is tempered by other scholars who state Paul would no more impose celibacy than insist on marriage. What people instinctively choose manifests God's gift. Thus, he takes for granted that the married are not called to celibacy.

As the Church developed as an institution and came into contact with the Greek world, it reinforced the idea found in writers such as Plato and Aristotle that the celibate unmarried state was preferable and more holy than the married one. At the same time, it challenged some of the prevalent social norms such as the buying and selling of women into marriage, and defended the right of women to choose to remain unmarried virgins for the sake of Christ. The stories associated with the many virgin martyrs in the first few centuries of the Catholic Church often make it clear that they were martyred for their refusal to marry, not necessarily simply their belief in Christ.

The teaching on the superiority of virginity over marriage expressed by Paul was accepted by the early Church, as shown in the 2nd-century Shepherd of Hermas. Justin Martyr, writing in the middle of the 2nd century, boasted of the "many men and women of sixty and seventy years of age who from their childhood have been the disciples of Christ, and have kept themselves uncorrupted". Virginity was praised by Cyprian (c. 200 – 258) and other prominent Christian figures and leaders. Philip Schaff admits that it cannot be denied that the later doctrine of the 16th century Council of Trent – "that it is more blessed to remain virgin or celibate than to be joined in marriage" – was the view that dominated the whole of the early Christian church. At the same time, the Church still discouraged anyone who would "condemn marriage, or abominate and condemn a woman who is a believer and devout, and sleeps with her own husband, as though she could not enter the Kingdom [of heaven]".

For much of the history of the Catholic Church, no specific ritual was therefore prescribed for celebrating a marriage – at least not until the late medieval period: "Marriage vows did not have to be exchanged in a church, nor was a priest's presence required. A couple could exchange consent anywhere, anytime".

=== Church Fathers ===
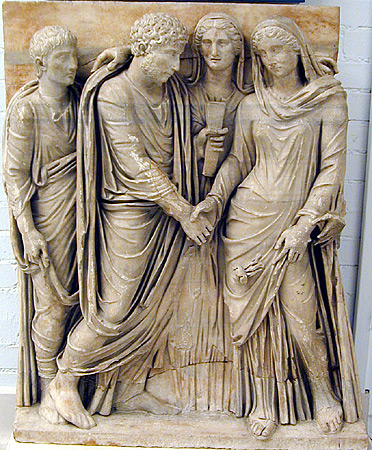
Marriage without religious rite

Markus notes this impact on the early Christian attitude, particularly as Christian anxiety about sex intensified after 400: "The superiority of virginity and sexual abstinence was generally taken for granted. But a dark undercurrent of hostility to sexuality and marriage became interwoven with the more benign attitudes towards the body. Attitudes diverged, and mainstream Christianity became infected with a pronounced streak of distrust towards bodily existence and sexuality. This permanent 'encratite' tendency was given powerful impetus in the debates about Christian perfection at the end of the fourth and the beginning of the fifth centuries".

While the Church Fathers of the Latin or Catholic Church did not condemn marriage, they nevertheless taught a preference for celibacy and virginity.

Bishop Ignatius of Antioch, writing around 110 to Bishop Polycarp of Smyrna said, "[I]t becomes both men and women who marry to form their union with the approval of the bishop, that their marriage may be according to God, and not after their own lust".

In his On Exhortation to Chastity Tertullian argued that a second marriage, after someone has been freed from the first by the death of a spouse, "will have to be termed no other than a species of fornication". Claiming to find in the Book of Leviticus a prohibition of remarriage by the priests of the Old Law similar to that for Christian clergy in the Pauline pastoral epistles, he used it as an argument against remarrying even on the part of lay Christians, whom Christ made "a kingdom, priests to his God and Father": "If you are a digamist, do you baptize? If you are a digamist, do you offer? How much more capital (a crime) is it for a digamist laic to act as a priest, when the priest himself, if he turn digamist, is deprived of the power of acting the priest! 'But to necessity', you say, 'indulgence is granted'. No necessity is excusable which is avoidable. In a word, shun to be found guilty of digamy, and you do not expose yourself to the necessity of administering what a digamist may not lawfully administer. God wills us all to be so conditioned, as to be ready at all times and places to undertake (the duties of) His sacraments".

In his earlier Ad uxorem also, Tertullian argued against second marriages, but said that, if one must remarry, it should be with a Christian. In other writings, he argued strongly against ideas like those he expressed in his On Exhortation to Chastity; and in his De Anima he explicitly stated that "the married state is blessed, not cursed by God". Adhémar d'Alès has commented: "Tertullian wrote a lot about marriage, and on no other subject has he contradicted himself as much".

Cyprian (c. 200 – 258), Bishop of Carthage, recommended in his Three Books of Testimonies against the Jews that Christians should not marry pagans. Addressing consecrated virgins he wrote: "The first decree commanded to increase and to multiply; the second enjoined continency. While the world is still rough and void, we are propagated by the fruitful begetting of numbers, and we increase to the enlargement of the human race. Now, when the world is filled and the earth supplied, they who can receive continency, living after the manner of eunuchs, are made eunuchs unto the kingdom. Nor does the Lord command this, but He exhorts it; nor does He impose the yoke of necessity, since the free choice of the will is left".

Jerome (c. 347 – 420) commenting on Paul's letter to the Corinthians wrote: "If 'it is good for a man not to touch a woman', then it is bad for him to touch one, for bad, and bad only, is the opposite of good. But, if though bad, it is made venial, then it is allowed to prevent something which would be worse than bad. ... Notice the Apostle's carefulness. He does not say: 'It is good not to have a wife', but, 'It is good for a man not to touch a woman'. ... I am not expounding the law as to husbands and wives, but discussing the general question of sexual intercourse – how in comparison with chastity and virginity, the life of angels, 'It is good for a man not to touch a woman'". He also argued that marriage distracted from prayer, and so virginity was better: "If we are to pray always, it follows that we must never be in the bondage of wedlock, for as often as I render my wife her due, I cannot pray. The difference, then, between marriage and virginity is as great as that between not sinning and doing well; nay rather, to speak less harshly, as great as between good and better". Regarding the clergy, he said: "Now a priest must always offer sacrifices for the people: he must therefore always pray. And if he must always pray, he must always be released from the duties of marriage". In referring to Genesis chapter 2, he further argued that, "while Scripture on the first, third, fourth, fifth, and sixth days relates that, having finished the works of each, God saw that it was good, on the second day it omitted this altogether, leaving us to understand that two is not a good number because it destroys unity, and prefigures the marriage compact". Jerome reaffirmed Genesis 1:28 ("God blessed them, and God said unto them, Be fruitful, and multiply, and replenish the earth") and Hebrews 13:4 ("Marriage is honourable in all"), and distanced himself from the disparagement of marriage by Marcion and Manichaeus, and from Tatian, who thought all sexual intercourse, even in marriage, to be impure.

There were, of course, counter-views. Pelagius thought Jerome showed bitter hostility to marriage akin to Manichaean dualism, an accusation that Jerome attempted to rebut in his Adversus Jovinianum: "We do not follow the views of Marcion and Manichaeus, and disparage marriage; nor, deceived by the error of Tatian, the leader of the Encratites, do we think all intercourse impure; he condemns and rejects not only marriage but also food which God created for the use of man. We know that in a great house, there are not only vessels of gold and silver, but also of wood and earthenware. [...] While we honour marriage we prefer virginity which is the offspring of marriage. Will silver cease to be silver, if gold is more precious than silver?" Elsewhere he explained: "Someone may say: 'And do you dare disparage marriage, which is blessed by the Lord?' It is not disparaging marriage when virginity is preferred to it. No one compares evil with good. Let married women glory too, since they come second to virgins. Increase, He says, and multiply, and fill the earth. Let him who is to fill the earth increase and multiply. Your company is in heaven". Mocking a monk who accused him of condemning marriage, Jerome wrote: "He must hear at least the echo of my cry, 'I do not condemn marriage', 'I do not condemn wedlock'. Indeed — and this I say to make my meaning quite clear to him — I should like every one to take a wife who, because they get frightened in the night, cannot manage to sleep alone".

It was Augustine (354–430), whose views subsequently strongly influenced Western theology, that was most influential in developing a theology of the sacramentality of Christian marriage. In his youth, Augustine had also been a follower of Manichaeism, but after his conversion to Christianity he rejected the Manichaean condemnation of marriage and reproduction for imprisoning spiritual light within material darkness. He subsequently went on to teach that marriage is not evil, but good, even if it is not at the level of choosing virginity: "Marriage and fornication are not two evils, whereof the second is worse: but marriage and continence are two goods, whereof the second is better".

In his On the Good of Marriage, of 401, he distinguished three values in marriage: fidelity, which is more than sexual; offspring, which "entails the acceptance of children in love, their nurturance in affection, and their upbringing in the Christian religion; and sacrament, in that its indissolubility is a sign of the eternal unity of the blessed. Like the other Church Fathers of East and West, Augustine taught that virginity is a higher way of life, although it is not given to everyone to live at that higher level. In his De bono coniugali (On the Good of Marriage), he wrote: "I know what people are murmuring: 'Suppose', they remark, 'that everyone sought to abstain from all intercourse? How would the human race survive?' I only wish that this was everyone's concern so long as it was uttered in charity, 'from a pure heart, a good conscience, and faith unfeigned'; then the city of God would be filled much more speedily, and the end of the world would be hastened". Armstrong sees this as an apocalyptic dimension in Augustine's teaching. Reynolds says that Augustine's comment on this wildly hypothetical objection by Jovinian may have been that the saintliness of a church in which all had chosen celibacy would mean that it comprised enough members to fill God's city or that the church would thereby gather souls to herself even more rapidly than she was already doing. Nevertheless, Augustine's name "could, indeed, be invoked through the medieval centuries to reinforce the exaltation of virginity at the expense of marriage and to curtail the role of sexuality even within Christian marriage".

Finally, Isidore of Seville (c. 560 – 636) refined and broadened Augustine's formulation and was part of the chain by which it was transmitted to the Middle Ages.

Although not a church father, but belonging to the same period, in Adomnan of Iona's biography of St Columba, the saint at one point is mentioned as meeting a woman who refuses to sleep with her husband and perform her marriage duties. When Columba meets the woman, she says that she would do anything, even to go to a monastery and become a nun, rather than to sleep with him. Columba tells the woman that the commandment of God is for her to sleep with her husband and not to leave the marriage to be a nun, because once they are married the two have become one flesh.

=== Medieval period ===
==== Sacramental development ====
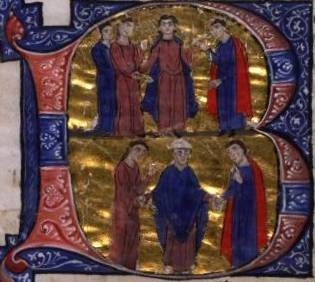
Betrothal and marriage around 1200

The medieval Christian church, taking the lead of Augustine, developed the sacramental understanding of matrimony. However, even at this stage the Catholic Church did not consider the sacraments equal in importance. Marriage has never been considered either to be one of the sacraments of Christian initiation (Baptism, Confirmation, Eucharist) or of those that confer a character (Baptism, Confirmation, Holy Orders).

With the development of sacramental theology, marriage was included in the select seven to which the term "sacrament" was applied. Explicit classification of marriage in this way came in reaction to the contrary teaching of Catharism that marriage and procreation are evil: the first official declaration that marriage is a sacrament was made at the 1184 Synod of Verona as part of a condemnation of the Cathars. In 1208, Pope Innocent III required members of another religious movement, that of the Waldensians, to recognize that marriage is a sacrament as a condition for being received back into the Catholic Church. In 1254, Catholics accused Waldensians of condemning the sacrament of marriage, "saying that married persons sin mortally if they come together without the hope of offspring". The Fourth Lateran Council of 1215 had already stated in response to the teaching of the Cathars: "For not only virgins and the continent but also married persons find favour with God by right faith and good actions and deserve to attain to eternal blessedness". Marriage was also included in the list of the seven sacraments at the Second Council of Lyon in 1274 as part of the profession of faith required of Michael VIII Palaiologos. The sacraments of marriage and holy orders were distinguished as sacraments that aim at the "increase of the Church" from the other five sacraments, which are intended for the spiritual perfection of individuals. The Council of Florence in 1439 again recognised marriage as a sacrament.

The medieval view of the sacramentality of marriage has been described as follows: "Like the other sacraments, medieval writers argued marriage was an instrument of sanctification, a channel of grace that caused God's gracious gifts and blessings to be poured upon humanity. Marriage sanctified the Christian couple by allowing them to comply with God's law for marriage and by providing them with an ideal model of marriage in Christ the bridegroom, who took the church as his bride and accorded it highest love, devotion, and sacrifice, even to the point of death".

==== Liturgical practice ====
Matrimony, for most of Church history, had been celebrated (as in traditions such as the Roman and Judaic) without clergy and was done according to local customs. The first available written detailed account of a Christian wedding in the West dates only from the 9th century and appears to be identical to the old nuptial service of Ancient Rome. However, early witnesses to the practice of intervention by the clergy in the marriage of early Christians include Tertullian, who speaks of Christians "requesting marriage" from them, and Ignatius of Antioch, who said Christians should form their union with the approval of the bishop – although the absence of clergy placed no bar, and there is no suggestion that the recommendation was widely adopted.

In the 4th century in the Eastern Church it was the custom in some areas for marriages to receive a blessing by a priest to ensure fertility. There are also a few accounts of religious nuptial services from the 7th century onward. However, while in the East the priest was seen as ministering the sacrament, in the West it was the two parties to the marriage (if baptized) who effectively ministered, and their concordant word was sufficient proof of the existence of a sacramental marriage, whose validity required neither the presence of witnesses nor observance of the law of the 1215 Fourth Lateran Council that demanded publication of the banns of marriage.

Thus, with few local exceptions, until in some cases long after the Council of Trent, marriages in Europe were by mutual consent, declaration of intention to marry and upon the subsequent physical union of the parties. The couple would promise verbally to each other that they would be married to each other; the presence of a priest or witnesses was not required. This promise was known as the "verbum". If freely given and made in the present tense (e.g., "I marry you"), it was unquestionably binding; if made in the future tense ("I will marry you"), it would constitute a betrothal. One of the functions of churches from the Middle Ages was to register marriages, which was not obligatory. There was no state involvement in marriage and personal status, with these issues being adjudicated in ecclesiastical courts. During the Middle Ages marriages were arranged, sometimes as early as birth, and these early pledges to marry were often used to ensure treaties between different royal families, nobles, and heirs of fiefdoms. The church resisted these imposed unions, and increased the number of causes for the nullification of these arrangements. As Christianity spread during the Roman period and the Middle Ages, the idea of free choice in selecting marriage partners increased and spread with it.

The validity of such marriages even if celebrated under a tree or in a tavern or in a bed was upheld even against that of a later marriage in a church. Even after the Council of Trent made the presence of the parish priest or his delegate and of at least two more witnesses a condition for validity, the previous situation continued in many countries where its decree was not promulgated. It ended only in 1908, with the coming into force of the Ne Temere decree.

In the 12th century, Pope Alexander III decreed that what made a marriage was the free mutual consent by the spouses themselves, not a decision by their parents or guardians. After that, clandestine marriages or youthful elopements began to proliferate, with the result that ecclesiastical courts had to decide which of a series of marriages that a man was accused of celebrating was the first and therefore the valid one. Though "detested and forbidden" by the Church, they were acknowledged to be valid. Similarly today, Catholics are forbidden to enter mixed marriages without permission from an authority of the Church, but if someone does enter such a marriage without permission, the marriage is reckoned to be valid, provided the other conditions are fulfilled, although illicit.

=== Counter-Reformation ===
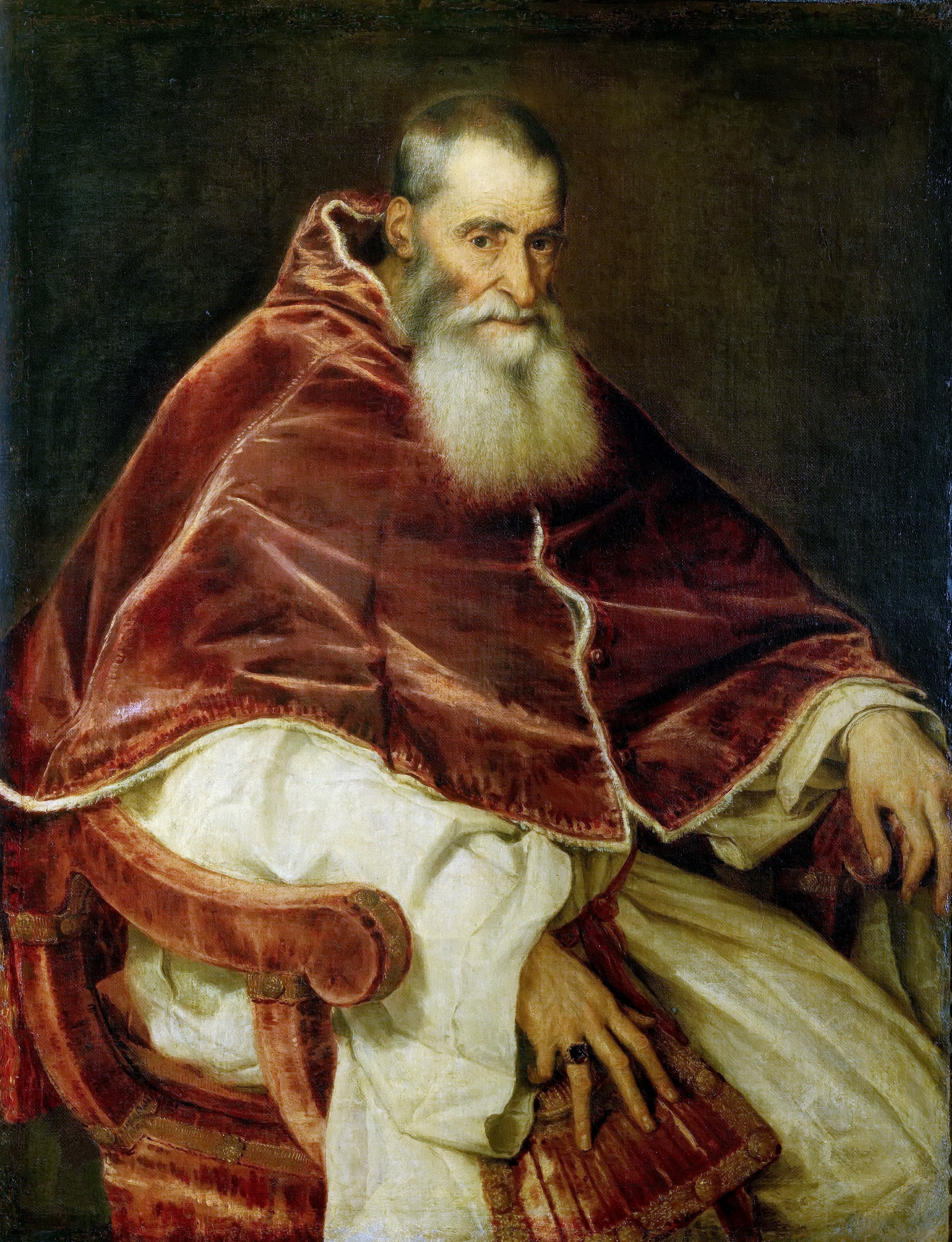
"Pope Paul III" (Artist: Titian) 1490–1576, c. 1543, Reign 13 October 1534 – 10 November 1549, Presided over part of the Council of Trent

In the 16th century, various groups adhering to the Protestant Reformation rejected to different degrees the sacramental nature of most Catholic sacraments. In reaction, the Council of Trent on 3 March 1547 carefully named and defined the Catholic Church's sacraments, reaffirming the teaching that marriage is a sacrament − from 1184, 1208, 1274 and 1439. Recalling scripture, the apostolic traditions and the declarations of previous councils and of the Church Fathers, the bishops declared that there were precisely seven sacraments, with marriage one of them, and that all seven are truly and properly sacraments.

Desiderius Erasmus influenced the debate in the first part of the 16th century by publishing 1518 an essay in praise of marriage (Encomium matrimonii), which argued that the single state was "a barren way of life hardly becoming to a man". The theologian Josse Clichtove working at the University of Paris interpreted this as an attack on chastity, but Erasmus had found favor with Protestant reformers who acknowledged the argument as a useful tool to undermine compulsory clerical celibacy and monasticism. Diarmaid MacCulloch argued that the action taken at Trent was therefore partly a response by Roman Catholicism to demonstrate that it was as serious about marriage and the family as the Protestants,.

On 11 November 1563, the Council of Trent condemned the view that "the marriage state is to be placed above the state of virginity, or of celibacy, and that it is not better and more blessed to remain in virginity, or in celibacy, than to be united in matrimony". And while Catholics upheld the supernatural character of marriage, it was Protestants who viewed it as not a sacrament and who admitted divorce.

The decree Tametsi of 1563 was one of the last decisions made at Trent. The decree effectively sought to impose the Church's control over the process of marriage by laying down as strict conditions as possible for what constituted a marriage. John P. Beal says the Council, "stung by the Protestant reformers' castigation of the Catholic Church's failure to extirpate clandestine marriages", issued the decree "to safeguard against invalid marriages and abuses in clandestine marriages", which had become "the scourge of Europe". In 1215 the Fourth Lateran Council had prohibited marriages entered into clandestinely but, unless there was some other impediment, considered them valid though illicit. Tametsi made it a requirement even for validity, in any area where the decree was officially published, that the marriage take place in the presence of the parish priest and at least two witnesses. This revolutionised earlier practice in that "marriages that failed to meet these requirements would from the time of the promulgation of the decree be considered invalid and of no effect"; and it required that the priest keep written records, with the result that parents had more control over their children's marriages than before. It also instituted controls over the marriages of persons without fixed addresses ("vagrants are to be married with caution"), "regulated the times at which marriages could be celebrated, abolished the rule that sexual intercourse created affinity, and reiterated the ban on concubinage".

For fear that the decree would "identify and multiply the number of doubtful marriages, particularly in Protestant areas, where 'mixed' marriages were common", the council hesitated to impose it outright and decided to make its application dependent on local promulgation. In fact, Tametsi was never proclaimed worldwide. It had no effect in France, England, Scotland and many other countries and in 1907 was replaced by the decree Ne Temere, which came into effect universally at Easter 1908.

== Validity of marriage in the Catholic Church ==
The Catholic Church also has requirements before Catholics can be considered validly married in the eyes of the Church. A valid Catholic marriage results from four elements: (1) the spouses are free to marry; (2) they freely exchange their consent; (3) in consenting to marry, they have the intention to marry for life, to be faithful to one another and be open to children; and (4) their consent is given in the canonical form, i.e., in the presence of two witnesses and before a properly authorized church minister. Exceptions to the last requirement must be approved by church authority. The Church provides classes several months before marriage to help the participants inform their consent. During or before this time, the would-be spouses are confirmed if they have not previously received confirmation and it can be done without grave inconvenience (Canon 1065).

The Catholic Church also recognizes as sacramental, (1) the marriages between two baptized Protestants or between two baptized Orthodox Christians, as well as (2) marriages between baptized non-Catholic Christians and Catholic Christians, although in the latter case, consent from the diocesan bishop must be obtained, with this termed "permission to enter into a mixed marriage". To illustrate (1), for example, "if two Lutherans marry in the Lutheran Church in the presence of a Lutheran minister, the Catholic Church recognizes this as a valid sacrament of marriage". On the other hand, although the Catholic Church recognizes marriages between two non-Christians or those between a Catholic Christian and a non-Christian, these are not considered to be sacramental, and in the latter case, the Catholic Christian must seek permission from his/her bishop for the marriage to occur; this permission is known as "dispensation from disparity of cult". The Church prefers that marriages between Catholics, or between Catholics and other Christians, be celebrated in the parish church of one of the spouses. Those helping to prepare the couple for marriage can assist with the permission process. In present-day circumstances, with communities no longer so homogeneous religiously, authorization is more easily granted than in earlier centuries.

=== Canonical form ===
The canonical form of marriage began to be required with the decree Tametsi issued by the Council of Trent on 11 November 1563. The decree Ne Temere of Pope Pius X in 1907 made the canonical form a requirement even where the decree of the Council of Trent had not been promulgated.

While allowing for exceptions, the canonical form of marriage, as laid down in Canons 1055–1165 of the 1983 Code of Canon Law and Canons 776-866 of the Code of Canons of the Eastern Churches, normally recognizes marriages of Catholics as valid only if contracted before the local bishop or a parish priest delegated by the bishop or (in the Latin Church only) a deacon delegated by them, and also at least two witnesses. In earlier times, validity was not made dependent on the fulfillment of these two conditions.

==== Freedom to marry ====
The participants in a marriage contract must have the freedom to marry. That is, there must be no impediment according to canon law.

==== Impediments ====
A Catholic marriage cannot be formed if one or more of the following impediments are present, although for some of these a dispensation can be given:

- Antecedent and perpetual impotence, whether on the part of the man or the woman
- Consanguinity to the fourth degree in the collateral line (first cousin), including legal adoption to the second collateral line
- Affinity – relationship by marriage, e.g. a mother-in-law, in the direct line
- Prior bond – the bond of a previous marriage
- Those in sacred orders
- Public and perpetual vow of chastity in a religious institute
- Disparity of cult – one of the persons was baptized in the Catholic Church or received into it, and the other is not baptized
- Crimen – one party previously conspiring to marry upon the condition of the death of their spouse while still married; also called conjugicide.
- The minimum age for entering into a valid marriage has not yet been reached (14 for women, 16 for men)
- Abduction

==== Times of year for celebrating a marriage ====
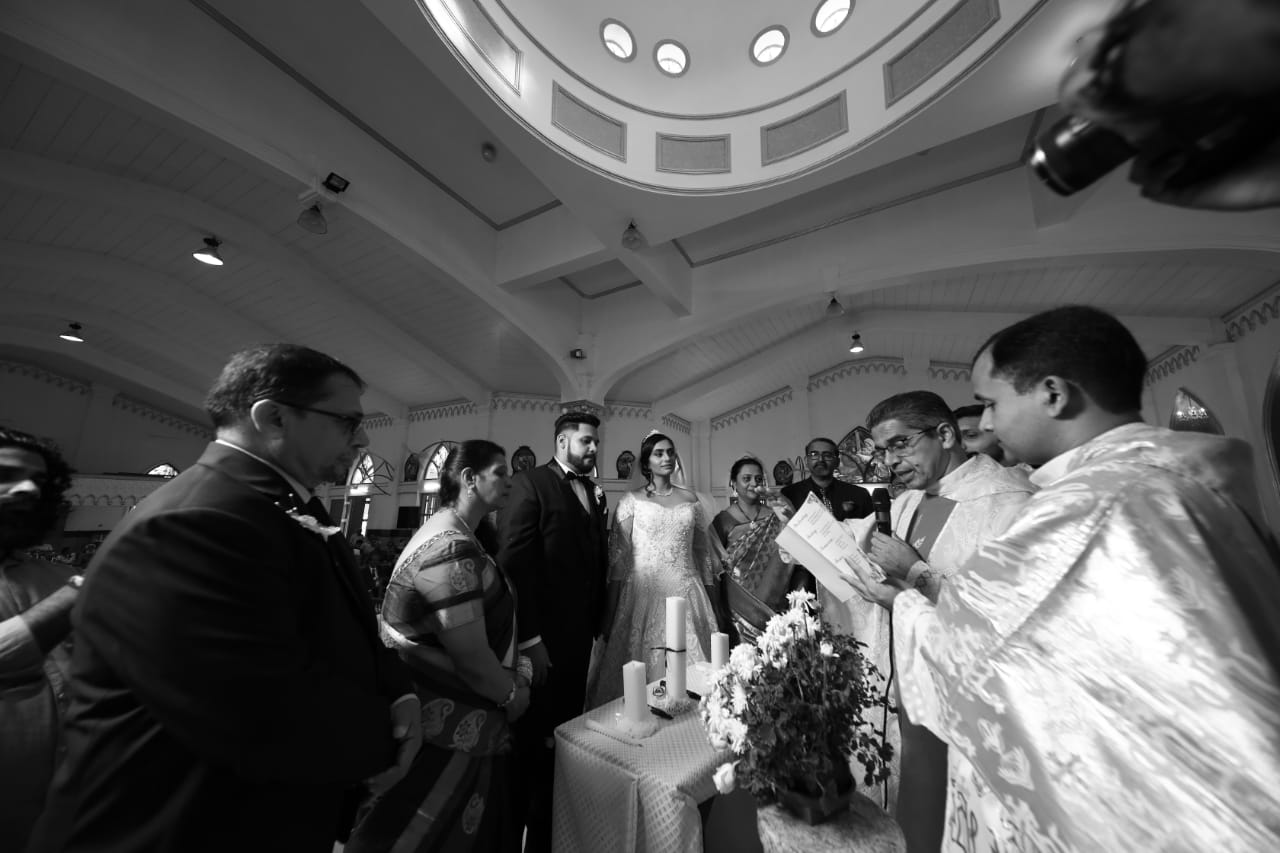
Priest reading the blessing at a Catholic wedding, 2018

In the Latin Church, marriage may be celebrated during Lent even within a Nuptial Mass; however, it is considered inappropriate to have such a celebration during Holy Week and impossible during the Easter Triduum. In principle, no day of the week is excluded from marriage. Some Eastern Catholic Churches do not allow marriage during Lent. In earlier times, while the Latin Church allowed marriage to be celebrated at any time, it prohibited the solemn blessing of marriages during Advent and on Christmas Day, and during Lent and on Easter Sunday.

=== Mixed marriages ===
While marriage between a Catholic and any non-Catholic is commonly spoken of as a mixed marriage, in the strict sense a mixed marriage is one between a Catholic (baptized in the Catholic Church or received into it) and a non-Catholic Christian, known in popular parlance as an interdenominational marriage.

The Catholic Church has from the start opposed marriage between a Catholic and any non-Catholic, baptized or not, seeing it as "degrading the holy character of matrimony, involving as it did a communion in sacred things with those outside the fold. [...] it was but natural and logical for the Church to do all in her power to hinder her children from contracting marriage with those outside her pale, who did not recognize the sacramental character of the union on which they were entering". The Church thus saw as obstacles to a Catholic's marriage what came to be called the two impediments of mixed religion (in Latin, mixta religio) and of difference of worship (in Latin disparitas cultus).

==== Marriage with a non-Catholic Christian ====
From an early stage, Church councils forbade Catholic Christians to marry heretics or schismatics. Unlike marriage with a non-Christian, which came to be considered invalid, marriage with a heretic was seen as valid, though illicit unless a dispensation had been obtained. However, the Church's opposition to such unions is very ancient. Early regional councils, such as the 4th-century Council of Elvira and the Council of Laodicea, legislated against them; and the ecumenical Council of Chalcedon prohibited such unions especially between members of the lower ecclesiastical grades and heretical women.

In 692, the Council in Trullo declared such marriages invalid, a decision accepted in the East, but not in the West.

With the Reformation in the 16th century, more legislation regarding mixed marriages was passed. In those countries where the Council of Trent's Tametsi decree was promulgated, mixed marriages began to be viewed as invalid in the West, not directly because of being mixed, but because a condition for validity imposed by the decree was not observed, namely, that marriages be contracted before the parish priest or a priest delegated by him and at least two witnesses. This decree required the contract to be entered into before the parish priest or some other priest delegated by him, and in the presence of two or three witnesses under penalty of invalidity. Even where the Tametsi decree had been promulgated, the Church did not find it possible to insist on the rigour of this legislation in all countries, owing to strong Protestant opposition. However, the legislation was frequently enforced by Catholic parents stipulating in their wills that their children be disinherited if they renounced Catholicism.

Pope Benedict XIV issued a declaration (the "Benedictine dispensation") concerning marriages in the Netherlands and Belgium (1741), in which he declared mixed unions to be valid, provided they were according to the civil laws. A similar declaration was made concerning mixed marriages in Ireland by Pope Pius, in 1785, and gradually the "Benedictine dispensation" was extended to various localities. Pius VI allowed mixed marriages in Austria to take place in the presence of a priest, provided no religious solemnity was employed, and with the omission of public banns, as evidence of the unwillingness of the Church to sanction such unions. In 1869, the Congregation of the Propaganda further permitted such marriages but only under the condition of grave necessity, fearing the faithful "expose themselves to the grave dangers inherent in these unions". Bishops were to warn Catholics against such marriages and not to grant dispensations for them except for weighty reasons and not at the mere will of the petitioner. In countries where the decree was not promulgated, marriages otherwise contracted, called clandestine marriages, continued to be considered valid until the decree was replaced in 1908 by the decree Ne Temere of Pope Pius X, which revoked the "Benedictine dispensation".

Catholic Christians are permitted to marry validly baptized non-Catholic Christians if they receive permission to do so from a "competent authority" who is usually the Catholic Christian party's local ordinary; if the proper conditions are fulfilled, such a marriage entered into is seen as valid and also, since it is a marriage between baptized persons, it is a sacrament.

Weddings in which both parties are Catholic Christians are ordinarily held in a Catholic church, while weddings in which one party is a Catholic Christian and the other party is a non-Catholic Christian can be held in a Catholic church or a non-Catholic Christian church.

A condition for granting permission to marry a non-Catholic is that the Catholic Christian party undertake to remove dangers of defecting from the faith and to do all in his or her power so that all the children are baptized and brought up in the Catholic Church; the other party is to be made aware of this undertaking and obligation of the Catholic Christian party.

==== Marriage with a non-Christian ====
The early Church did not consider invalid a Catholic's marriage with a non-Christian (someone not baptized), especially when the marriage had taken place before the Catholic's conversion to the faith. It was nevertheless hoped that the converted wife or husband would be the means of bringing the other party into the Church, or at least safeguarding the Catholic upbringing of the children of the union. With the growth of the Church, the need for such unions diminished and the objection to them grew stronger. More by custom than by church legislation, such marriages gradually came to be considered invalid and disparitas cultus came to be seen as an impediment to marriage by a Catholic. There were also enactments on a local level against marriages with pagans (Council of Carthage (397), and under Stephen I of Hungary in the early 11th century) and with Jews (Third Council of Toledo in 589).

When the Decretum of Gratian was published in the 12th century, this impediment became part of canon law. From that time forward, all marriages contracted between Catholics and non-Christians were held to be invalid unless a dispensation had been obtained from the ecclesiastical authority.

A marriage between a Catholic and a non-Christian (someone not baptized) is seen by the Church as invalid unless a dispensation (called a dispensation from "disparity of cult", meaning a difference of worship) is granted from the law declaring such marriages invalid. This dispensation can only be granted under certain conditions. If the dispensation is granted, the Church recognizes the marriage as valid, but natural rather than sacramental, since the sacraments can be validly received only by the baptized, and the non-Christian person is not baptized.

=== Matrimonial consent ===
According to Canon 1057 of the Code of Canon Law (1983), marriage is established through the consent of the parties legitimately manifested between persons who are capable, according to the law, of giving consent.

Consent, which no human power can replace, is the efficient cause of marriage. It is defined by Canon 1057.1 as an act of the will by which a man and a woman through an irrevocable personal covenant mutually give and accept each other for the purpose of establishing marriage.

Such consent, however, must be manifested in a legitimate manner, that is, in a manner that has been determined by the Church in the formal solemnities prescribed for the validity of marriage (the canonical form).

The persons manifesting their consent must be capable of doing that according to the law.

=== Remarriage of widows or widowers ===
The teaching of the Catholic Church is that a married couple commits themselves totally to one another until death. The vows they make to each other in the wedding rite are a commitment "til death do us part". After the death of one, the other is free to marry again or to remain single. Some choose to become priests or religious. This path was chosen by some even in the early Christian centuries by people such as Saint Marcella, Saint Paula, Saint Galla of Rome and Saint Olympias the Deaconess.

== Ministers of matrimony ==
=== Western church ===
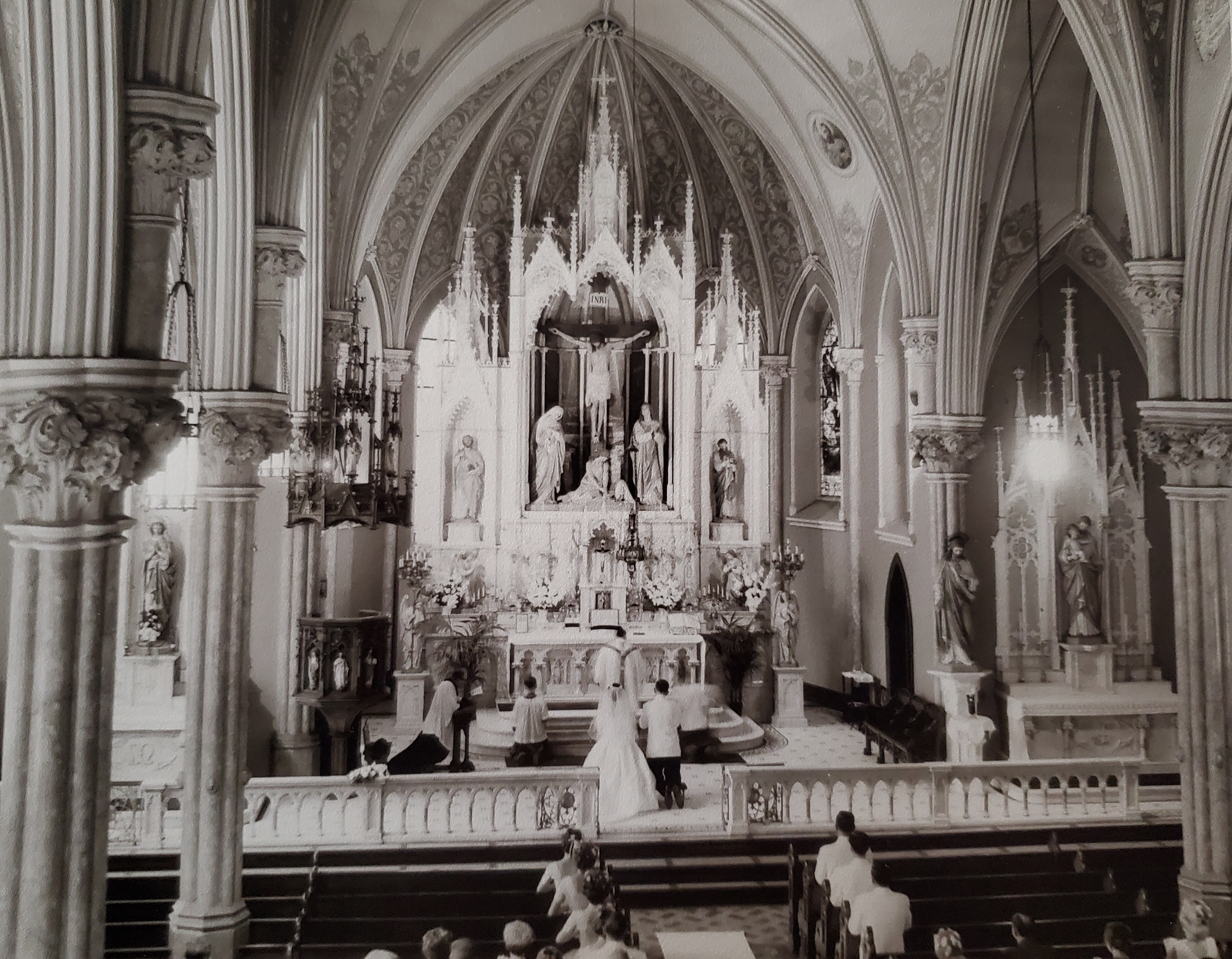
Tridentine Nuptial Mass, 1961

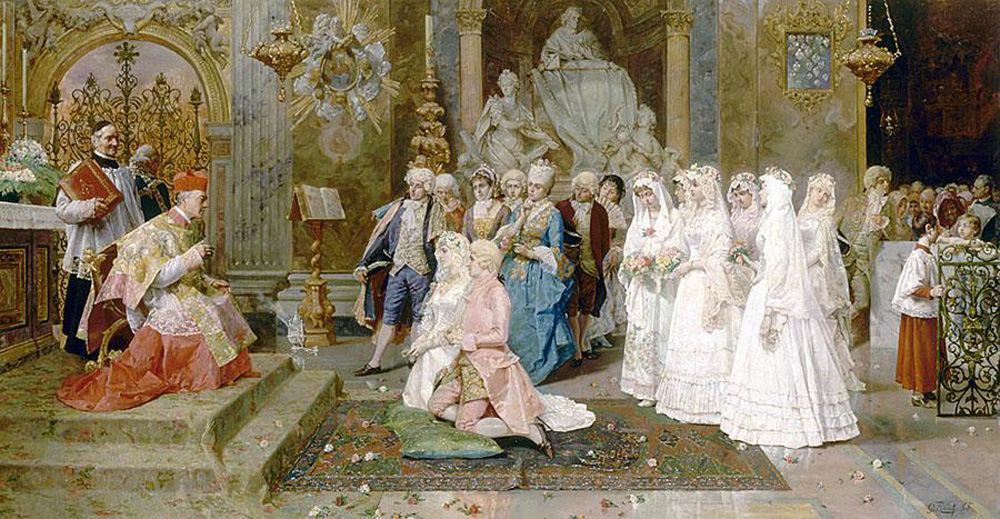
Ceremony of Marriage (Giulio Rosati)

The husband and wife must validly execute the marriage contract. In the Latin Catholic tradition, it is the spouses who are understood to confer marriage on each other. The spouses, as ministers of grace, naturally confer upon each other the sacrament of matrimony, expressing their consent before the church.

This does not eliminate the need for church involvement in the marriage; under normal circumstances, canon law requires for validity the attendance of the local bishop or parish priest (or a priest or deacon delegated by either of them) and at least two witnesses. The priest has merely the role to "assist" the spouses in order to ensure that the marriage is contracted in accord with canon law, and is supposed to attend whenever it is possible. A competent layperson may be delegated by the Church, or may just attend in place of the priest, if it is impractical to have a priest attending. In the event that no competent layperson is found, the marriage is valid even if done in the presence of two witnesses alone. For example, in May 2017, the Congregation for Divine Worship and the Discipline of the Sacraments granted a bishop's request that a nun be granted permission to officiate at a marriage ceremony in Quebec because of a shortage of priests.

=== Eastern churches ===
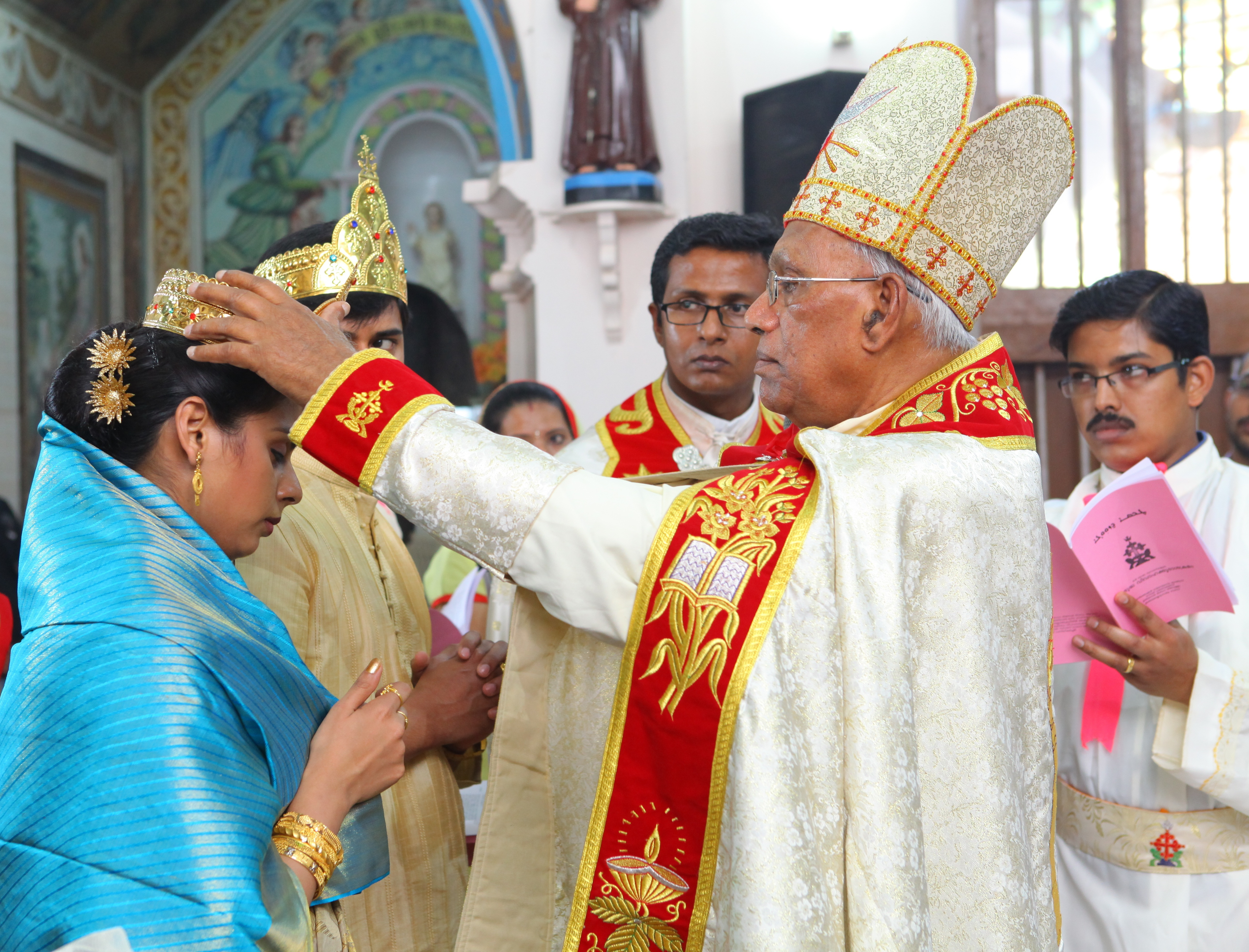
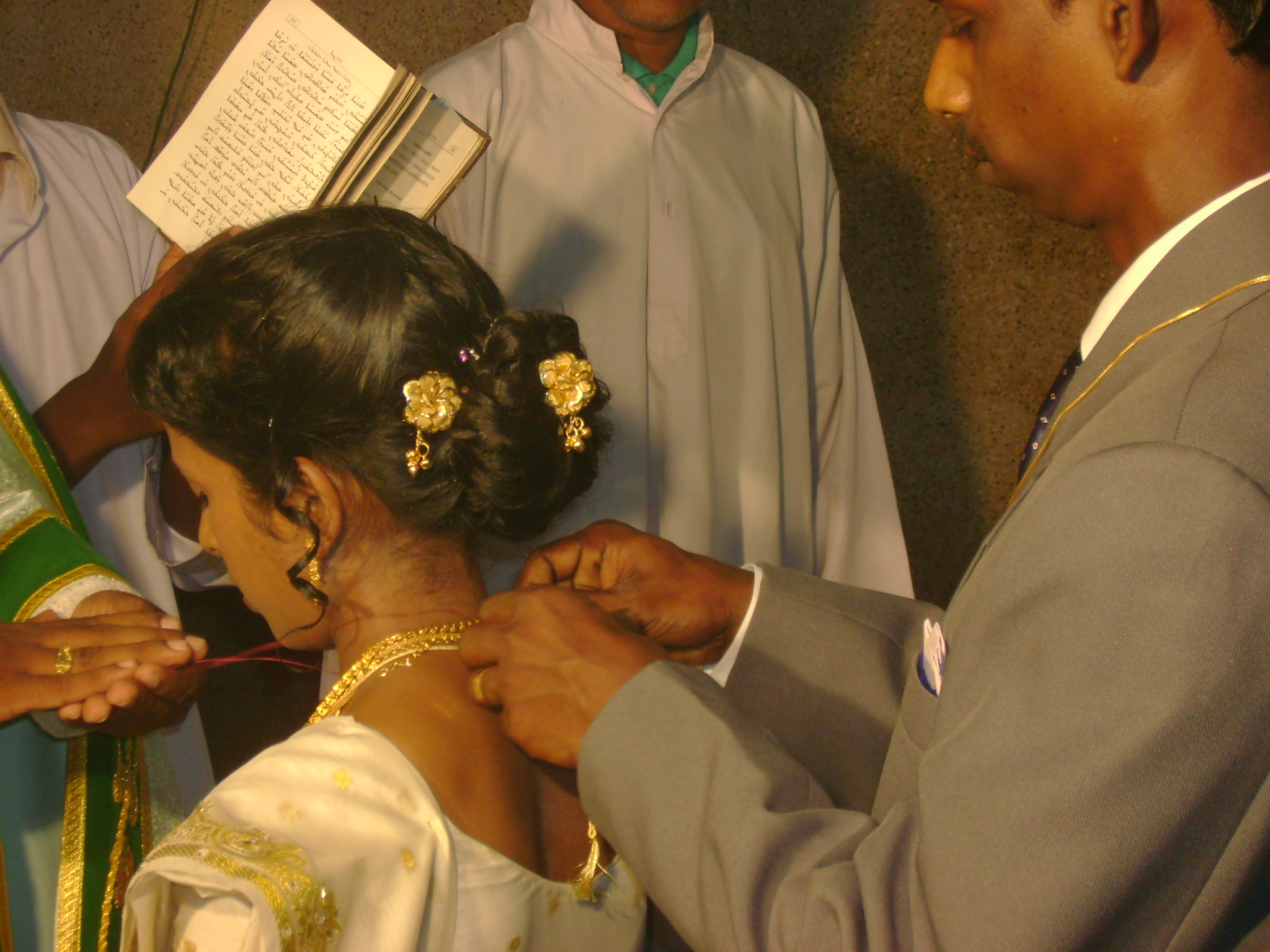
Syro-Malabar crowning and Syro-Malankara Minnu Kettu.

Eastern Catholic churches share the tradition common throughout Eastern Christianity, according to which the minister of the sacrament is the bishop or priest who "crowns the bridegroom and the bride as a sign of the marriage covenant", a ceremony that has led to the rite being called the Mystery of Crowning.

== Indissolubility ==
Catholic theology teaches that a validly contracted sacramental marriage is accompanied by divine ratification, creating a virtually indissoluble union until the couple consummate, after which the sacramental marriage is dissoluble only by the death of a spouse. An unconsummated marriage can be dissolved by the Pope, as Vicar of Christ.

In the eyes of the Church, even validly contracted natural marriages (marriages in which at least one of the parties is not baptized) cannot be dissolved by the will of the couple or by any action of the state. Accordingly, "the Catholic Church does not recognize or endorse civil divorce of a natural marriage, as of a sacramental marriage". However, a natural marriage, even if consummated, can be dissolved by the Church when to do so favours the maintenance of the faith on the part of a Christian, cases of what has been called Pauline privilege and Petrine privilege. In these cases, which require intervention by the Holy See, the Church admits real divorce, the actual dissolution of a valid marriage, as distinct from the granting by merely human power of a divorce that, according to Catholic theology, does not really dissolve the marriage bond.

While the violation of some regulations may make a marriage illicit, but not invalid, some conditions are essential and their absence means that there is in fact no valid marriage, and the participants are considered not to be actually married. However, Canon 1137 states that children born to a "putative" marriage (defined in Canon 1061, sec. 3 as one that is not valid but was entered into in good faith by at least one spouse) are legitimate; therefore, the declaration that a marriage is null does not render the children of that marriage illegitimate.

=== Annulments ===
The Catholic Church has consistently taken the position that, while the dissolution of a valid natural marriage, even if consummated, may be granted for the sake of someone's Christian faith ("in favorem fidei"), though not for other reasons, and that a valid sacramental marriage, if not consummated, may be dissolved, a valid sacramental consummated marriage is indissoluble. There is no divorce from such a marriage. However, what is referred to as a marriage annulment occurs when two competent ecclesiastical tribunals hand down concordant judgments that a particular marriage was not in fact a valid one.

Requirements for the validity of marriage are listed in the Code of Canon Law under the headings "Diriment Impediments" (such as being too young, being impotent, being already married, being ordained), "Matrimonial Consent" (which requires, for instance, sufficient use of reason, psychic ability to assume the essential obligations of marriage, and freedom from force and fear), and "The Form of the Celebration of Marriage" (normally requiring that it be contracted in the presence of the parish priest or his delegate and at least two other witnesses).

An annulment is a declaration that the marriage was invalid (or null) at the time the vows were exchanged. Thus, an annulment is declared only when an ecclesial tribunal finds a lack of validity in the marriage at the time of the marital contract. Behaviour subsequent to the contract is not directly relevant, except as post factum evidence of the validity or invalidity of the contract. That is, behaviour subsequent to the contract cannot actually change the validity of the contract. For example, a marriage would be invalid if one of the parties, at the time of marriage, did not intend to honour the vow of fidelity. If the spouse did intend to be faithful at the time of the marriage but later committed adultery this does not invalidate the marriage.

The teaching of the Catholic church is that annulment and divorce therefore differ, both in rationale and effect; an annulment is a finding that a true marriage never existed, whereas a divorce is a dissolution of marriage.

In canon law there are numerous reasons for granting annulments of marriages that were entered into invalidly. MacCulloch has noted the "ingenuity" of Roman Catholic lawyers in deploying these in the historical context.

Annulments are not restricted to marriages. A similar process can lead to the annulment of an ordination.

== Sins against marriage and conjugal chastity ==
The teaching of the Catholic Church is that marriage may only be between one man and one woman with each partner's free and willing consent for the good of each other and for the transmission of human life. The church believes adultery, divorce, remarriage after divorce, marriage without the intent to transmit life, polygamy, incest, child abuse, free union, and trial marriage are sins against the dignity of marriage. The church also believes that chastity must be practiced by spouses, and that sins against chastity include lust, masturbation, fornication, pornography, prostitution, rape, incest, child abuse, and homosexuality in any shape or form.

The Catholic Church opposes the introduction of both civil and religious same-sex marriage. The Church also holds that same-sex unions are an unfavourable environment for children and that the legalization of such unions damages society. Leading figures in the Catholic hierarchy, including cardinals and bishops, have publicly voiced or actively opposed legislation of civil same-sex marriage and encouraged others to do the same, and have done likewise with regard to same-sex civil unions and adoption by same-sex couples.

There are a growing number of Catholics globally who dissent from the official position of the Roman Catholic hierarchy and express support for civil unions or same-sex marriage. In some locations, for example North America, Northern and Western Europe, there is stronger support for LGBT rights (such as civil unions, civil same-sex marriage and protection against discrimination) among Catholics than the general population at large.

In 2021, the Catholic Church reaffirmed its position: That "the Church does not have the power to give the blessing to unions of persons the same sex". In 2023 the Dicastery for the Doctrine of the Faith clarified that individual sinners may be blessed in non-liturgical settings that do not confuse the simple blessing with sacramental marriage in a decree called Fiducia Supplicans.

On 11 March 2023, the Synodal Path with support of over 80 percentage of German Roman Catholic bishops allowed blessing ceremonies for same-sex couples in all 27 German Roman Catholic diocese. In April 2025, Roman Catholic German bishop conference published a document for blessing ceremonies for same-sex marriages.

== See also ==
- Banns of marriage
- Nuptial Mass
- Christian views of marriage
- Christian views on divorce
- Declaration of nullity
- Defender of the Bond
- Impediment of crime
- Matrimonial dispensation
- Natural marriage
- Pauline privilege
- Vetitum
- Parish register
