= Defender of the bond =

Official in Catholic matrimonial causes

A defender of the bond (Latin: defensor vinculi or defensor matrimonii) is a Catholic Church official whose duty is to defend the marriage bond in the procedure prescribed for the hearing of matrimonial causes which involve the validity or nullity of a marriage already contracted. In current Canon Law the role is provided for in Book VII, Title 1, which deals with marriage processes.

== History ==
Benedict XIV, by his bull Dei miseratione of 3 November 1741, introduced this official into the marriage procedure to guard against abuses occurring from the ordinary procedure. An annulment of a marriage might result from the appearance of only the spouse who desired freedom to enter upon a new marriage, while the other was apathetic and conniving at the annulment, or at times unable or indisposed to incur expense to uphold the marriage, especially if it required an appeal to a higher court. Scandal arose from the frequency of dissolution of marriages with the freedom to enter new contracts.

== Qualifications and obligations ==
The bull requires that in each diocese, the ordinary appoint a defender of marriage, upright in character, and learned in the law, an ecclesiastic if possible, a layman if necessary. The bishop may suspend him or remove him for cause, and, if he is prevented from taking part in the procedure, substitute another with the requisite qualifications.

=== Proceedings in first instance ===
He must be summoned to any trial in which there is question, before a competent judge, of the validity or nullity of a marriage, and any proceeding will be null if he is not duly cited. He must have the opportunity to examine the witnesses, and, orally or in writing, to bring forward whatever arguments may favour the validity of the marriage. He must be cited even though the party interested in the defence of the marriage be present, and all the acts of the court are always to be accessible to him, and at any time he has a right to bring forward new documents or witnesses favourable to the marriage. On assuming his office he must take an oath to fulfill his duties and he is expected to renew the oath in each case. If the judge decides in favour of the marriage the defender takes no further action unless its opponent appeals to a higher court. Here a defender undertakes anew the defence of its validity. If the judge of the first instance decides against the validity of the marriage and no one else appeals, the defender of marriage has the right to appeal to the higher court. If he feels it his duty to appeal, a new marriage may not be contracted until his plea is heard.

This canon legislation was extended and enforced in the United States by an Instruction of Propaganda in 1883, published with the Acts and Decrees of the Third Plenary Council of Baltimore. Though the bull does not require it, the practice of the Roman church extends the intervention of the defender to cases of true marriages not consummated where the Holy See is requested to grant a dispensation for a new marriage.

=== Proceedings in second instance ===
The obligation of the defender to appeal from the decision of first instance adverse to the validity of a marriage has been modified by the Holy See in several cases where the invalidity depends upon facts indisputably proven. Where the decree "Tametsi" of the Council of Trent was binding, requiring the presence of the parish priest for the validity, if only a civil ceremony was used, the bishop may declare the marriage null without the participation of the defender. In view of new matrimonial law contained in the decree "Ne Temere" of Pius X this also holds anywhere if a marriage is attempted only before a civil authority or non-Catholic minister of religion. Yet if an ecclesiastical form had been used, and the nullity from clandestinity was questioned, the presence of the defender is required; but if the impediment of clandestinity clearly appears he need not appeal. This is true also if, through absence of ecclesiastical dispensation, there is an impediment of disparity of worship, or of consanguinity, or of affinity from lawful intercourse, or of spiritual relationship, or of certain previous legitimate marriage still existing. In these cases the ordinary may, with the participation of the defender, declare the marriage null, and the defender is not required to appeal. This, however, was declared by the Holy Office (27 May 1901) to be understood only of cases in which certainly and clearly the impediment is proven; otherwise the defender must proceed to the higher court. The defender is exhorted to exercise his office gratuitously, but he may be compensated from fees imposed by the court or from other diocesan resources.

Briefs submitted to the tribunal by the defender of the bond are considered part of the "acts" of the case and the parties have a right to view and comment on the acts before the decision is made by the judge(s).
