= Privilege (Catholic canon law) =

Legal concept in Catholic canon law

Privilege in the canon law of the Roman Catholic Church is the legal concept whereby someone is exempt from the ordinary operation of the law over time for some specific purpose.

== Definition ==
Papal privileges resembled dispensations, since both involved exceptions to the ordinary operations of the law. But whereas "dispensations exempt[ed] some person or group from legal obligations binding on the rest of the population or class to which they belong," "[p]rivileges bestowed a positive favour not generally enjoyed by most people." "Thus licences to teach or to practise law or medicine, for example," were "legal privileges, since they confer[red] upon recipients the right to perform certain functions for pay, which the rest of the population [was] not [permitted to exercise.]" Privileges differed from dispensations in that dispensations were for one time, while a privilege was lasting. Yet, such licenses might also involve what should properly be termed dispensation, if they waived the canon law requirement that an individual hold a particular qualification to practice law or medicine, as, for example, a degree.

The distinction between privilege and dispensation was not always clearly observed, and the term dispensation rather than privilege was used, even when the nature of the act made it clearly a privilege. Indeed, medieval canonists treated privileges and dispensations as distinct, though related, aspects of the law. Privileges and indults were both special favours. Some writers hold that the former are positive favours, while indults are negative. The pope might confer a degree as a positive privilege in his capacity as a temporal sovereign, or he might do so by way of dispensation from the strict requirements of the canon law. In both cases his authority to do so was found in the canon law.

== Academic degrees ==
In some instances, petitioners sought an academic degree because without one they could not hold a particular office. Canons of certain cathedrals and Westminster Abbey were still required to be degree-holders until recent times. The Dean of Westminster Abbey was required to be a doctor or bachelor of divinity as recently as the late twentieth century.

In the event of degree status being conferred, the recipient was not deemed to hold the degree in question but would enjoy any privileges which might be attached to such a degree—including qualification for office. Conferring the degree itself would of course mean that the recipient enjoyed the style and not merely the privileges of a degree. They might also, for example, be thereafter admitted or incorporated to the same degree ad eundum at Oxford or Cambridge—though few seem to have been so distinguished. It was however often difficult to be certain whether the degree itself, or merely its status and privileges, which was being conferred. Given the ostensible purpose of the papal dispensatory jurisdiction, it would perhaps be more logical to view all of these “degrees” as strictly degree-status, and not substantive degrees. But the medieval—if not indeed modern—concept of the degree is of a grade or status. One achieves the status of master or doctor, which is conferred by one's university (or in rare cases, by the pope). It is not an award, but the recognition of a certain degree of learning. It is perhaps significant that in the records of the (post-Reformation) Court of Faculties, the early “Lambeth degrees” are described in terms of dispensation to enjoy the privilege of DCL or whatever the degree might be.

The exercise of the authority to confer such a privilege was often a positive step by the pope to emphasise his spiritual, if not temporal, authority. During the fifteenth century, attempts were made in England to restrict the exercise of papal power in opposition to the Statute of Provisors. To evade the disabilities imposed by that Act on non-graduates, it became usual towards the end of the century for those clerics not educated at English universities to obtain dispensations from Rome, including, in a few cases, degrees.

== See also ==
- Priest–penitent privilege
- Pauline privilege
- Petrine privilege
