= Hegumen =

Head of an Eastern Orthodox or Eastern Catholic monastery

Hegumen, hegumenos, or igumen (Greek: ἡγούμενος, trans. hēgoúmenos), is the title for the head of a monastery in the Eastern Orthodox and Eastern Catholic Churches, or an archpriest in the Coptic Orthodox Church, similar to the title of abbot. The head of a convent of nuns is called a hegumenia or igumeni (Greek: ἡγουμένη).

== Overview ==
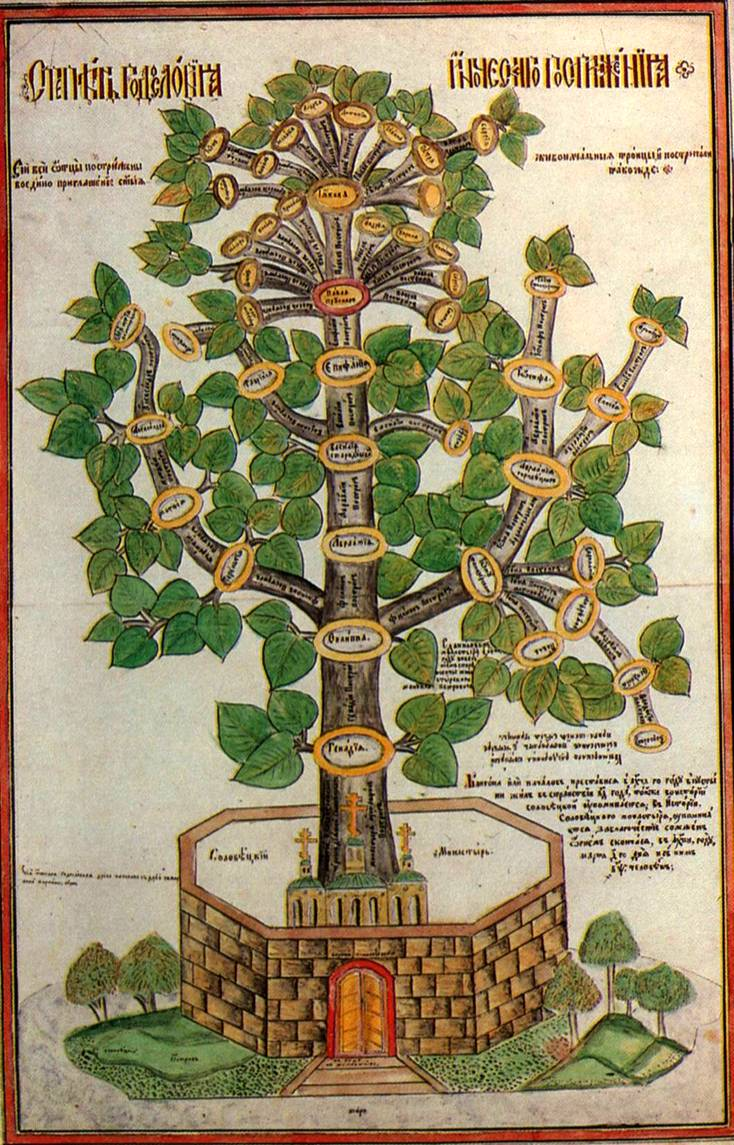
"Family Tree of the Solovetsky Monastery". A hand-drawn lubok listing the names of the monastery's hegumens (1870s).

Initially, the title was applied to the head of any monastery. After 1874, when the Russian monasteries were reformed and classified into three classes, the title of hegumen was reserved only for the lowest, third class. The head of a monastery of the second or first class holds the rank of archimandrite. In the Greek Catholic Church, the head of all monasteries in a certain territory is called the protohegumen.

The duties of both hegumen and archimandrite are the same, archimandrite being considered the senior dignity of the two. In the Russian Orthodox Church, the title of Hegumen may be granted as an honorary title to any hieromonk, even one who does not head a monastery.

A ruling hegumen is formally installed in a ceremony by the bishop, during which he is presented with his pastoral staff (Greek: paterissa, Slavonic: посох, posokh). Among the Russians, the pastoral staff for a Hegumen tends to be of wood (usually ebony), rather than metal. The hegumen is awarded the gold pectoral cross by the bishop, as for an archpriest. During divine services, the hegumen wears a simple black monastic mantle, while the higher-ranking archimandrite wears a mantle similar to one worn by a bishop (though without the white "rivers" along the sides, and decorated with unadorned "tablets" at the neck and feet). An archimandrite also wears a mitre similar to one worn by a bishop; a hegumen does not (however, in the Russian tradition, a bishop may grant an hegumen the privilege of wearing the mitre as an ecclesiastical award). A hegumen may carry his pastoral staff in processions and when giving blessings in the church (though it is never carried into the sanctuary), although it usually stands upright next to his kathisma (monastic choir stall). When outside the church, a hegumen may use a wooden walking stick (Slavonic: жезл, zhezl) similar to that used by a bishop or archimandrite, only not adorned with a silver knob.

In the Coptic Orthodox Church of Alexandria, the rank is used in the capacity of an archpriest and actually is one. The name in Arabic is kommos (قمص); this honorary title is granted to both married priests and hieromonks without distinction and is not used in the capacity of an Abbot, although the monasteries' abbots used to be Hegumen until the beginning of the 20th century, but by mid-century the Church of Alexandria started to appoint Bishops in the capacity of Abbots. On the other hand, the rank of archimandrite fell into disuse in the Church of Alexandria from the late 16th century.
