= Christian views on divorce =

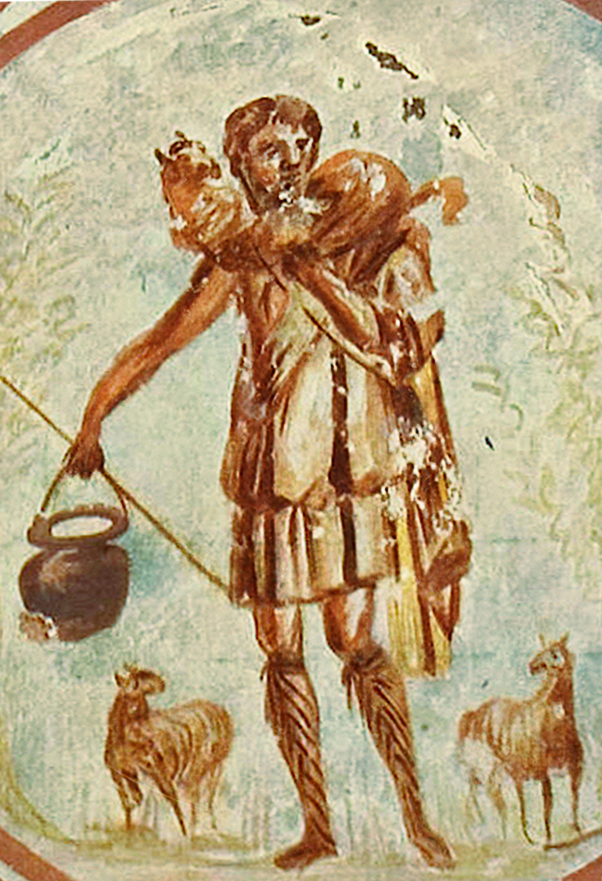
The Shepherd of Hermas, an early Christian text that discussed marriage

Christian views on divorce find their basis both in biblical sources and in texts authored by the Church Fathers of the early Christian Church, who were unanimous in condemning the practice.

== Early Christianity ==
Biblical scholars generally agree that the historical Jesus prohibited divorce and remarriage, though the tradition-history of the command remains debated. According to the synoptic Gospels, Jesus emphasized the permanence of marriage (see Mark 10 at verses 1 to 12, Matthew 19; Luke 16:18) but also its integrity. In the King James Version of the Gospel of Mark, verses 11 and 12, Jesus says "Whosoever shall put away his wife, and marry another, committeth adultery against her. And if a woman shall put away her husband, and be married to another, she commits adultery." The Gospel of Luke adds that those who marry divorced persons also commit adultery, as recorded in Luke 16:18. 1 Corinthians 6:9–10 states that adulterers "shall not inherit the kingdom of God". Matthew 19:9 does discuss adultery as possible grounds for divorce. Matthew's exemption for adultery need not be interpreted as contradictory to Mark 10 and Luke 16; Jesus's ban on divorce could have taken for granted that sexual immorality ended marriage.

The Shepherd of Hermas, an early Christian work on the subject, teaches that while fornication is the only reason that divorce can ever be permitted, remarriage with another person is forbidden to allow repentance and reconciliation of the husband and wife (those who refuse to forgive and receive their spouse are guilty of a grave sin). This Christian teaching is echoed in 1 Corinthians 7:10–11, which forbids divorce and states that those spouses who have deserted their husband/wife should return their partner; if that is absolutely impossible, the husband and wife should remain chaste.

Both in the Gospel of Matthew and of Mark, Jesus remembers and quotes Genesis 1:27 ("male and female created He them"), and Genesis 2:24 ("shall a man leave father and mother, and shall cleave to his wife: and they twaine shall be one flesh."). Paul the Apostle concurred but added an exception, interpreted according to Catholicism as the Pauline privilege; this interpretation of Paul's words teaches that in the case of a non-Christian couple (neither party has ever received the sacrament of baptism) where one of the parties converts to Christianity and receives the sacrament of baptism, that party is allowed to enter into a Christian marriage if and only if the non-Christian spouse departs.

The Catholic Church does not prohibit civil divorce; however, a Catholic may not remarry after a civil divorce unless they have received an annulment (a finding that the marriage was not canonically valid) under a narrow set of circumstances. The Eastern Orthodox Churches permit 'ecclesiastical divorce' and remarriage in church in certain circumstances, though its rules are generally more restrictive than the civil divorce rules of most countries. Most Protestant churches discourage divorce though the way divorce is addressed varies by denomination; for example, the United Church of Christ permits divorce and allows for the possibility of remarriage, while denominations such as the Mennonite Christian Fellowship and Evangelical Methodist Church Conference forbid divorce except in the case of fornication and do not allow for the remarriage of divorced persons.

== Summary by denomination ==
Divorce and remarriage policy by Christian denomination
Policy	Denominations
No official policy, but membership is allowed regardless of divorced status	African Methodist Episcopal Zion Church, Alliance of Baptists, Vineyard USA, Quakers, African Methodist Episcopal, Christian Church (Disciples of Christ), American Baptist Churches USA (ABCUSA), United Church of Christ, National Baptist Convention, USA, Episcopal Church in America, Christian Reformed Church of North America (CRCNA), Reformed Church in America (RCA), Evangelical Lutheran Church in America, Presbyterian Church (USA), United Methodist Church (UMC)
Divorce permitted in case of adultery and desertion by unbeliever	Providence Baptist Church, Christian & Missionary Alliance, United Church of God, Anglican Church of North America, Seventh-day Adventist, Calvary Chapel, Evangelical Free Church
Divorce permitted in case of adultery and desertion	Wisconsin Evangelical Lutheran Synod, Lutheran Church Missouri Synod, Orthodox Presbyterian Church, Evangelical Covenant Church
Divorce permitted in case of adultery, domestic violence and desertion	Assemblies of God, Reformed Church in the United States (RCUS), Evangelical Presbyterian Church, Presbyterian Church in America (PCA)
Divorce permitted in case of adultery	Protestant Reformed Churches in America, Southern Baptist Convention, Jehovah's Witnesses, Oriental Orthodox Churches, Allegheny Wesleyan Methodist Connection
Divorce permitted with permission of the Church leadership	The Church of Jesus Christ of Latter-day Saints
Divorce permitted with permission of local bishop	Church of England (since 2002), Anglican Church of Canada
Divorce permitted up to three times for adultery, desertion, addiction and mental illness	Eastern Orthodox Churches
Divorce prohibited in all cases	Roman Catholic Church, Apostolic Faith Church, Southeastern Mennonite Conference, Mennonite Christian Fellowship, Biblical Mennonite Alliance

== Catholic Church ==
Although marriage was not yet a dogmatically defined sacrament, by the ninth or tenth century the divorce rate had been greatly reduced under the influence of the Catholic Church, which considered marriage to be instituted by God and Christ indissoluble by mere human action. Marriage was later dogmatically defined as a sacrament, beginning in 1208, when Pope Innocent III required members of another religious movement to recognize that marriage was a sacrament as a condition for being received back into the Catholic Church. In 1254, Catholics accused Waldensians of condemning the sacrament of marriage, "saying that married persons sin mortally if they come together without the hope of offspring". In 1439 the Council of Florence defined marriage as a sacrament, solidifying the development of doctrine from the previous twelve centuries and described marriage as 'insoluble' "since it signifies the indivisible union of Christ and the church." The passage follows, "Although the separation of bed is lawful on account of fornication, it is not lawful to contract another marriage since the bond of a legitimately contracted marriage is perpetual."

Although divorce, as known today, was generally allowed in Western Europe after the 10th century, separation of husband and wife and the annulment of marriage were also well-known. What is today referred to as "separate maintenance" (or "legal separation") was termed "divorce a mensa et thoro" ("divorce from bed-and-board"). The husband and wife were physically separated and were forbidden to live or cohabit together, but their marital relationship did not fully terminate. Civil courts had no power over marriage or divorce.

The Catholic Church historically opposed the legalization of civil divorce in Catholic countries. For example, when Republican Spain legalized divorce in Spain for the first time, Pope Pius XI wrote: 'the new Spanish legislation, with the deleterious introduction of divorce, dares to profane the sanctuary of the family, thus implanting, with the attempted dissolution of domestic society, the germs of saddest ruin for civil well-being.'

Canon law makes no provision for divorce, but a declaration of nullity may be granted when the proof is produced that essential conditions for contracting a valid marriage were absent—i.e., that the sacrament did not take place due to some impediment. The grounds for annulment are determined by Church authority and applied in ecclesiastical courts. Annulment was known as "divorce a vinculo matrimonii", or "divorce from all the bonds of marriage", for canonical causes of impediment existing at the time of the marriage. "For in cases of total divorce, the marriage is declared null, as having been unlawful ab initio."

The Church holds that the sacrament of marriage produces one person from two, inseparable from each other: "Holy Scripture affirms that man and woman were created for one another: 'It is not good that the man should be alone.' The woman, 'flesh of his flesh,' his equal, his nearest in all things, is given to him by God as a 'helpmate'; she thus represents God from whom comes our help. 'Therefore a man leaves his father and his mother and cleaves to his wife, and they become one flesh.' The Lord himself shows that this signifies an unbreakable union of their two lives by recalling what the plan of the Creator had been 'in the beginning': 'So they are no longer two, but one flesh. '" Since husband and wife became one person upon marriage, that oneness can only be seen as null if the parties improperly entered into the marriage initially, in which case the marriage does not validly exist.

In 2016, Pope Francis published Amoris laetitia, which pertains to the reception of Holy Communion by the divorced and remarried who live together "more uxorial". However, there have been no updates to Catholic canon law as a result of this apostolic exhortation.

== Eastern Orthodox Churches ==
The Eastern Orthodox Churches do recognize that there are occasions when couples should separate, and permit remarriage in Church, though its 'ecclesiastical divorce' rules are stricter than civil divorce in most countries. For the Eastern Orthodox, the marriage is "indissoluble" as in it should not be broken, the violation of such a union, perceived as holy, being an offence resulting from either adultery or the prolonged absence of one of the partners. Thus, permitting remarriage is an act of compassion of the Church towards sinful man. Ecclesiastical Divorce may be granted by the Eastern Orthodox Churches on the following grounds:

1. one or both parties is guilty of adultery.
2. one party is proven to be mad, insane or suffers from a social disease which was not disclosed to the spouse prior to the marriage.
3. one party has conspired against the life of the spouse.
4. one party is imprisoned for more than seven years.
5. one party abandons the other for more than three years without approval.
6. one partner should be absent from home without the other's approval, except in instances when the latter is assured that such absence is due to psycho-neurotic illness.
7. one partner forces the other to engage in illicit affairs with others.
8. one partner does not fulfill the responsibilities of marriage, or when it is medically proven that one party is physically impotent or as the result of a social venereal disease.
9. one partner is an addict, thereby creating undue economic hardship.

A very low rate of divorce among Orthodox Christians in Greece may suggest that the same may be said for Orthodox Christians in the U.S. However, U.S. rates are inconclusive. The actual divorce rate is probably somewhat higher due to civil divorces obtained without an accompanying ecclesiastical divorce. Divorced individuals are usually allowed to remarry though there is usually imposed on them a penance by their bishop and the services for the second marriage, in this case, are more penitential than joyful. The Orthodox Church traditionally states that "it blesses the first marriage, performs the second, tolerates the third, and forbids the fourth". Widowed spouses are permitted to remarry without repercussion and their second marriage is considered just as blessed as the first. One exception to this rule is the clergy and their wives. Should a married priest die, it is expected that his widow will not remarry. Widowed priests are not allowed to remarry either and frequently end up in monasteries.

== Oriental Orthodox Churches ==
The Oriental Orthodox Churches are more severe than the Eastern Orthodox Church in terms of divorce and adopt an intermediate position between Rome and Constantinople, allowing it only in the case of adultery. This position is true for both the Syriac Orthodox Church, the Armenian Apostolic Church, the Ethiopian Orthodox Tewahedo Church and the Coptic Orthodox Church.

== Anabaptist Churches ==
Certain Anabaptist denominations, such as the Southeastern Mennonite Conference, teach the indissolubility of marriage. In the same vein, the Mennonite Christian Fellowship teaches the "sinfulness of remarriage following divorce". The Biblical Mennonite Alliance holds that divorced and remarried persons are living in adultery and are therefore in "an ongoing state of sin that can only be truly forgiven when divorced and remarried persons separate."

== Lutheran Churches ==
Martin Luther deplored divorce and "thought it clear, both from the ordinance of creation and the teaching of Christ, that marriage is meant to last throughout life". He taught that the innocent party in adultery and the innocent party in desertion were exceptions in which divorce was allowed on Scriptural grounds. With regard to the innocent party in adultery, Luther held that "the guilty party severed the marriage tie so that the innocent one can act as though his spouse has died and he is free to marry again". Concerning the innocent party in desertion, Luther taught that this was an extension of the Pauline privilege as "any husband or wife who deserted the home proved themselves to be unbelievers in fact, whatever they might be in name, and therefore should be treated as such."

== Anglican Churches ==
Henry VIII of England is known for breaking with the Catholic Church partly in order to obtain an annulment.

=== Early history ===
Divorce followed by remarriage was illegal in early modern England, becoming a felony in 1604, categorized as bigamy.

Under influence of Church law and tradition, England lacked general civil divorce laws until 1857. What few civil divorces did occur in England and Wales before 1857 were by Act of Parliament and thus were limited to those with the wealth, power, or connections to secure passage of a private bill. The Divorce Bill of 1857 introduced legislation granting divorces; this was passed over the opposition of most clergy. The Matrimonial Causes Act of 1937 amended the 1857 law, greatly extending the grounds for divorce for matters other than adultery.

=== Prominent Anglican perspectives ===
Several Anglicans have opposed divorce and remarriage:

- Elizabeth I and Archbishop Parker.
- Edmund Bunny (c. 1595) a Yorkshire minister issues sermons and tracts.
- John Dove (c. 1601) preacher at St Paul's Cross.
- John Howson (c. 1602) vice-chancellor of Oxford, 1602.

The Puritans were an English reform movement within the Church of England that sought to remove its Catholic influence and complete the reformation. They largely supported marital dissolubility promoting divorce and remarriage. Prominent Puritans that lobbied the Church of England include:

- John Rainolds, a prominent academic during Queen Elizabeth's reign.
- William Whatley, minister of Banbury.
- John Milton

=== Current Anglican Communion ===
In 2002, the Church of England repealed a longtime ban on divorced people remarrying until after a spouse's death under "exceptional circumstances." This is why King Edward VIII, who married Wallis Simpson (a divorcee with a living ex-husband) in 1936 (i.e. before 2002), could not remain King (and head of the Church of England), while Prince Charles of Wales (later King Charles III) could marry Camilla Parker Bowles (a divorcee with a living ex-husband) in 2005 (i.e. after 2002) and later become King and head of the Church.

The modern Anglican Church of Canada permits divorce and remarriage.

== Reformed Churches ==
The Westminster Confession of Faith (WCF), which is a secondary standard of the Presbyterian Church, allows for divorce under certain circumstances. In chapter 24, section 5, it states that the contract of marriage may be dissolved in the case of adultery or abandonment, citing Matthew 5.31 as proof.

The Reformed Church in America affirms "providing support and help during marital stress and during the difficult period of reconstruction after divorce; and to ensure as far as possible the success of any remarriage that takes place".

== Methodist Churches ==
Traditional Methodist views on divorce have been expressed in the Book of Discipline of the mother church of Methodism, the Methodist Episcopal Church, as well as historic writings by Methodist ministers including Jerry Miles Humphrey, who penned A Word Of Warning On Divorce-Marriage. The Doctrines and Disciplines of the Methodist Episcopal Church (1884) teaches that "No divorce, except for adultery, shall be regarded by the Church as lawful; and no Minister shall solemnize marriage in any case where there is a divorced wife or husband living: but this Rule shall not be applied to the innocent party to a divorce for the cause of adultery, nor to divorced parties seeking to be reunited in marriage." The present-day teaching and church discipline regarding divorce varies with the Methodist connexion. The Allegheny Wesleyan Methodist Connection, in its 2014 Discipline, teaches:

We believe that the only legitimate marriage is the joining of one man and one woman (Gen. 2:24; Rom. 7:2; 1 Cor. 7:10; Eph. 5:22, 23). We deplore the evils of divorce and remarriage. We regard adultery as the only scripturally justifiable grounds for divorce; and the party guilty of adultery has by his or her act forfeited membership in the church. In the case of divorce for other cause, neither party shall be permitted to marry again during the lifetime of the other; and violation of this law shall be punished by expulsion from the church (Matt. 5:32; Mark 10:11, 12). In the carrying out of these principles, guilt shall be established in accordance with judicial procedures set forth in The Discipline.

The Emmanuel Association of Churches teaches in its 2002 Guidebook:

Since God's Word strictly forbids remarriage after divorce (Mark 10:2-12); and because of the suffering of the divorcees, the stigma placed upon their children, and the ruination of homes, no divorced and remarried person who continues to live in such a relationship shall be allowed to belong to the Emmanuel Association of Churches or an affiliated church or take any appointed part in public service.

The United Methodist Church, in its 2012 Book of Discipline, states:

God's plan is for lifelong, faithful marriage. The church must be on the forefront of premarital, marital, and postmarital counseling in order to create and preserve strong marriages. However, when a married couple is estranged beyond reconciliation, even after thoughtful consideration and counsel, divorce is a regrettable alternative in the midst of brokenness. We grieve over the devastating emotional, spiritual, and economic consequences of divorce for all involved, understanding that women and especially children are disproportionately impacted by such burdens. As the church we are concerned about high divorce rates. It is recommended that methods of mediation be used to minimize the adversarial nature and fault-finding that are often part of our current judicial processes, encouraging reconciliation wherever possible. We also support efforts by governments to reform divorce laws and other aspects of family law in order to address negative trends such as high divorce rates.

Although divorce publicly declares that a marriage no longer exists, other covenantal relationships resulting from the marriage remain, such as the nurture and support of children and extended family ties. We urge respectful negotiations in deciding the custody of minor children and support the consideration of either or both parents for this responsibility in the custody not be reduced to financial support, control, or manipulation and retaliation. The welfare of each child is the most important consideration.

Divorce does not preclude a new marriage. We encourage an intentional commitment of the Church and society to minister compassionately to those in the process of divorce, as well as members of divorced and remarried families in a community of faith where God's grace is shared by all.

For those who have been divorced and remarried prior to receiving the New Birth, many Methodist connexions, such as the Bible Methodist Connection of Churches in its 2018 Book of Discipline, teach:

We recognize that, in today's society, many have divorced and remarried while yet unsaved or unenlightened to the Scripture's teaching. When they are born from above, they become new creatures in Christ Jesus; they are justified, sanctified, and washed from the guilt of their former sins. We encourage them, therefore, to raise their current families to live for God.

For those who come to the Lord divorced for reasons other than adultery but who have not remarried, we recommend that they carefully seek God's will and pastoral counsel regarding how to proceed in this matter.

== Baptist Churches ==
Baptist perspectives vary on account of their governance structure that prizes local autonomy of the pastor and its congregants.

=== Particular Baptists ===
Particular baptist John Gill (c.1697–1771) argues for "indissoluble" marriages, yet understands desertion and adultery akin to death of a spouse.

=== 19th–20th centuries views ===
The Southern Baptists Convention states that discouragement of divorces from pastoral leadership was the dominant view throughout the 19th to 20th C. For instance, in 1964 the Christian Life Commission of the Baptist General Convention of Texas published a pamphlet in entitled "The Christian, The Church, and Divorce" which discouraged divorce, and for divorcees to hold leadership in church.

In the 1960s Foy Valentine argued for marital indissolubility stating: "Only in the exclusive union of one man and one woman joined together as one for life... can there be the abundantly full and deeply satisfying development of body, mind, and soul. This is God's intention for marriage." Valentine further opposed remarriage castigating it as "tandem polygamy."

=== Current views ===
Many conservative evangelical and Protestant churches, such as some Baptists, strongly oppose divorce, viewing it as a sin, pointing out Malachi 2:16 – "'For I hate divorce,' says Yahweh, the God of Israel, 'and him who covers his garment with violence!' says Yahweh of Armies. 'Therefore, take heed to your spirit, that you don't deal treacherously'" (WEB). However interfaith marriages are handled differently in Ezra 9–10 and 1 Corinthians 7 (the Pauline privilege).

== Pentecostal Churches ==
=== Holiness Pentecostalism ===
The Apostolic Faith Church, a Holiness Pentecostal denomination, teaches that marriage is a "covenant relationship which establishes a bond between a man and a woman that is dissolved only when death causes the inevitable separation." It teaches, however, that despite a Christian's best efforts to maintain a marriage "even when a believer has been abandoned and divorced by an unfaithful spouse, Scripture makes no allowance for remarriage while the first companion lives." With respect to an existing interfaith marriage, "When a believer is married to an unbeliever, the saved individual is not given license to divorce the unsaved."

=== Finished Work Pentecostalism ===
The Assemblies of God, a Finished Work Pentecostal denomination affirms divorce, yet restricts some divorcees from taking the office of elder in certain cases, stating:

In view of all the available biblical evidence relating to the divorce and remarriage problems in the Early Church, The General Council of the Assemblies of God has adopted interpretation six above—the description, "one woman man," is best understood to refer to persons in a sexually faithful, heterosexual, monogamous marriage, where neither partner has been previously divorced (except where the divorce occurred prior to conversion, as a result of the previous spouse's sexual infidelity, or because of abandonment of the believer by an unbeliever).

== Church of Jesus Christ of Latter-day Saints ==
The Church of Jesus Christ of Latter-day Saints (LDS Church) officially discourages divorce. The LDS Church encourages its members to work around marital problems before they lead to annulment or divorce, yet allows both practices in circumstances of infidelity or other serious cases. Divorce is regarded with heavy social stigma, and Church authorities maintain that "Latter-day Saints need not divorce—there are solutions to marriage problems." LDS Church policy allows members to seek civil divorce independent of ecclesiastical authority, but cancellation of a temple sealing may only be performed with special permission from the First Presidency of the Church.

The LDS Church discourages divorce largely on account of its theology of the family. Early church leaders taught that God himself lives in a family and with a wife. Tim B. Heaton, a sociologist from Brigham Young University, explains, "The key tenet in the Mormon Theology of the family is that, given the proper circumstances, family relationships will be perpetuated in heaven."

Latter-day Saint culture places an extreme emphasis on success in family life, leading to high expectations for marital success. David O. McKay, former President of the Church, stated that "no other success can compensate for failure in the home." Church publications often publish articles instructing members on means to improve married life, and, on rare occasions, will become involved politically when it feels the institution of marriage is threatened by proposed public policy. General Authority of the Church have repeatedly warned against an impermanent view of marriage. "[The view of marriage] as a mere contract that may be entered into at pleasure … and severed at the first difficulty … is an evil meriting severe condemnation, especially where children are made to suffer." In 2007 Dallin H. Oaks, a senior member of the Quorum of the Twelve Apostles, and a former judge on the Utah Supreme Court, has counseled church members that "the weakening of the concept that marriages are permanent and precious has far-reaching consequences."

Latter-day Saint couples (both with and without temple sealings) are found to have slightly lower rates of divorce when compared with Protestants and Catholics, and significantly lower rates when compared with those who state no religious preference. The following is a chart showing the rate of divorce among various religions with data copied from the study "Religion and Family Formation", conducted by Tim B. Heaton and Kristen L. Goodman.

Sex	Catholics	Liberal Protestants	Conservative Protestants	Latter-day Saints	No Religion
Male	19.8%	24.4%	27.7%	14.3%	39.2%
Female	23.1%	30.8%	30.9%	18.8%	44.7%

A lower divorce rate among Latter-day Saints may be due to a strong family culture, the difficulty of securing a cancellation of sealing, and other religious influences. Al Thornton, from the University of Michigan, comments that, "With its unique theology and heritage concerning marriage, family, and children, it should not be surprising to find that Mormon behavior differs from that of the larger society." Certain doctrines which are unique to Latter-Day Saint theology may help account for the lower divorce rate among active members. These doctrines include the literal parenthood of God the Father, the eternal nature of families, and the requirement of a successful temple marriage in order to gain salvation. For Latter-day Saints, divorce is "a very serious undertaking", both socially and religiously.

Various factors have been shown to lower incidence of divorce among church members, including church activity. Heaton says that, "Overall, church attendance is associated with lower rates of nonmarriage and divorce, [and] higher probabilities of remarriage after divorce." Studies suggest that the most important statistical variable affecting marital dissolution rates of Latter-day Saints is marriage in the temple, with some studies finding that non-temple marriages entered into by Latter-day Saints are almost five times more likely to result in divorce than are temple marriages.

The Encyclopedia of Mormonism states that "[t]he Church distinguishes between (1) civil marriages, which are valid for "time" (until divorce or the death of one spouse), and (2) temple marriages, or sealings, solemnized by proper ecclesiastical authority, which are binding for "time and all eternity." In order for a marriage to be considered eternally binding, it must be performed in a Latter-Day Saint temple by properly authorized temple workers. Marriage in the temple is strongly encouraged by church leaders, as Latter-day Saint marriages performed in the temple have less than a 7% chance of dissolution.

Latter-day Saints	Women	Men
Married in Temple	7%	6%
Not married in Temple	33%	28%

There is some debate over the validity of these figures. The LDS Church itself notes that "In reporting their findings, the two researchers noted that if there were some measure of religious commitment comparable to temple marriage among other religions, statistics for those groups might also be more favorable." The accuracy of this statistic is also disputed on the grounds that the process required to obtain a temple recommend artificially limits the test group to those who are already less likely to divorce. For example, the temple recommend requires Church members to abstain from pre-marital sex, a behavior associated with a higher divorce rate. This statistic also fails to take into account couples who enter into a temple marriage and subsequently obtain a civil divorce, yet fail to apply for a cancellation of temple sealings. Nevertheless, numerous studies show a strong link in the Latter-day Saint culture between marriage in the temple and a lower divorce rate, and that among members "the temple marriage [is] the most resistant to divorce."

In order to obtain a cancellation of temple sealings, permission from the First Presidency is required. Applicants for divorce are required to submit a request for a cancellation of sealings through their local ecclesiastical authorities, including information about the couple, and a personal appeal. The resulting cultural impact of a divorce upon an LDS couple is significant. Church leaders have stated that "every divorce is the result of selfishness on the part of one or both", and that selfishness is a leading cause of marital stress and divorce. Divorced Latter-day Saints may report feelings of alienation from fellow church-members and some Latter-day Saints may see divorce as "a sign of failure".

== Jehovah's Witnesses ==
Jehovah's Witnesses only allow divorce in case of adultery by one the spouses.

== Remarriage of divorcees ==
=== Remarriage as adultery ===
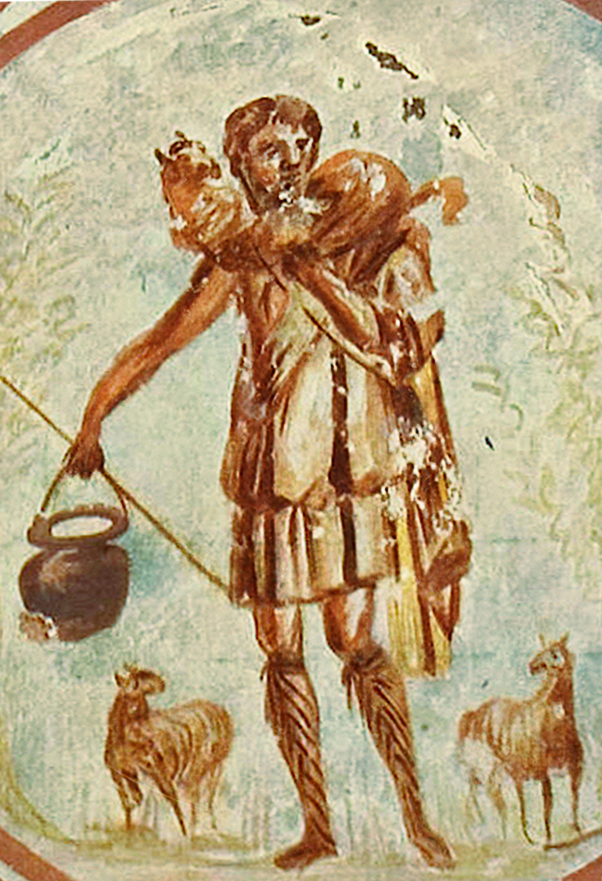
The Shepherd of Hermas, 3rd century, Catacombs of Rome.

Several throughout history have held the position that divorcees who seek to marry a new party while their first spouse remains alive constitutes adultery.

Shepherd of Hermas (c. 140) stated:

But if he put his wife away and marry another, he also commits adultery. And I said to him, "What if the woman put away should repent, and wish to return to her husband: shall she not be taken back by her husband?" And he said to me, "Assuredly. If the husband do not take her back, he sins, and brings a great sin upon himself; for he ought to take back the sinner who has repented."

Athenagoras of Athens discourages remarriage even after death:

[...]a person should either remain as he was born, or be content with one marriage; for a second marriage is only a specious adultery. "For whosoever puts away his wife," says He, "and marries another, commits adultery;" Matthew 19:9 not permitting a man to send her away whose virginity he has brought to an end, nor to marry again. For he who deprives himself of his first wife, even though she be dead, is a cloaked adulterer, resisting the hand of God, because in the beginning God made one man and one woman, and dissolving the strictest union of flesh with flesh, formed for the intercourse of the race.

Jerome stated that "if, while her husband lives, she be married to another man, she shall be called an adulteress." However, Jerome also stated that:

[...]if your sister, who, as she says, has been forced into a second union, wishes to receive the body of Christ and not to be accounted an adulteress, let her do penance; so far at least as from the time she begins to repent to have no farther intercourse with that second husband who ought to be called not a husband but an adulterer.

Augustine of Hippo:

Our Lord, therefore, in order to confirm that principle, that a wife should not lightly be put away, made the single exception of fornication; but enjoins that all other annoyances, if any such should happen to spring up, be borne with fortitude for the sake of conjugal fidelity and for the sake of chastity; and he also calls that man an adulterer who should marry her that has been divorced by her husband. And the Apostle Paul shows the limit of this state of affairs, for he says it is to be observed as long as her husband lives; but on the husband's death he gives permission to marry.

Canon Christopher Wordsworth (later Bishop) of the Church of England opposed the Divorce Bill of 1857, along with the majority of Church of England clergy. In Woodsworth's sermons, he describes remarriage as adultery.

== See also ==
- Biblical law in Christianity
- Expounding of the Law#Divorce
- Get (divorce document)
- Jewish views of marriage
- Houses of Hillel and Shammai (for information regarding 1st century sources that are often used to contextualize Christ's teaching)
- Matthew 5:32
- Pauline privilege
- Petrine privilege
- Religion and divorce
- Talaq (Nikah)
