= Ne Temere =

1907 Catholic decree

Ne Temere was a decree issued in 1907 by the Congregation of the Council regulating the canon law of the Church regarding marriage for practising Catholics. It is named for its opening words, which literally mean "lest rashly" in Latin.

== Issue ==
The decree was issued under Pope Pius X, 10 August 1907, and took effect on Easter 19 April 1908. It concerned the validity of all marriages involving Catholics. Marriages in Germany were exempted by the subsequent decree Provida.

== Differences from Tametsi ==
To the clandestinity requirements of the decree Tametsi of the Counter-Reformation Council of Trent, the decree reiterated the requirements that the marriage be witnessed by a priest and two other witnesses (adding that this requirement was now universal), added requirements that the priest (or bishop) being witness to the marriage must be the pastor of the parish (or the bishop of the diocese), or be the delegate of one of those, the marriage being invalid otherwise, and the marriage of a couple, neither one resident in the parish (or diocese), while valid, was illicit. It also required that marriages be registered.

On the success of a divorce action brought by a non-Catholic spouse, the Catholic spouse was still considered married in the eyes of the Church, and could not remarry to a third party in church.

It explicitly laid out that non-Catholics, including baptized ones, were not bound by Catholic canon law for marriage, and therefore could contract valid and binding marriages without compliance.

== Conflicts of laws ==
In 1911, Ne Temere was criticised by Richard Hely-Hutchinson, 6th Earl of Donoughmore in the then United Kingdom of Great Britain and Ireland for declaring that the Catholic Church would consider invalid for a Catholic a marriage that they entered into in any way other than before the parish priest or a Catholic priest delegated by him, even if in civil law it was valid.

In March 1911, the issue of the Catholic Church's canon law declaring invalid marriages that were recognised as valid by the State raised political and judicial issues in Canada when a judge of Quebec's Superior Court confirmed the annulment by the Catholic Church of the marriage of two Catholics which had been performed by a Methodist minister. The wife subsequently appealed the decision, saying that she had offered no defense in the original civil suit because she feared she might lose custody of her child. The appeal's judge declared that the Ne Temere decree had "no civil effect on said marriage," and that the Archbishop's ecclesiastical decree of annulment had "no judicial effect in said case". The previous civil judgement was declared nullified.

In New South Wales in 1924, the legislature came within one vote of criminalising the promulgation of the decree.

=== McCann Case ===
The McCann case of 1910 served as an example to Protestant Unionists of what would happen if Home Rule, or "Rome Rule" as they saw it, was implemented. The case concerned a couple in Belfast that had been married in a Protestant ceremony. The husband, who was Catholic, allegedly left his Protestant wife by the urging of a priest to the Ne Temere decree, taking their children with him. The controversy sparked outrage among the Protestant Unionists, and more than likely increased opposition to Home Rule.

=== Tilson case ===
Ne Temere focused on the validity of marriages in which only one party was a Catholic. Although it did not specifically make any mention of children born to such marriages, it did require the issuance of a dispensation. A condition of the granting of said dispensation was a promise that any children born of such union would be raised in the Catholic faith.

In common law jurisdictions the father, by what is called the principle of "paternal supremacy", has the right to decide the religious upbringing of all the children of the marriage. At first, this held also in the Republic of Ireland, even if he had entered into a contrary agreement in writing. The Supreme Court of Ireland still upheld paternal supremacy in 1945 in a judgement that the children, whose father had died, should be kept in a Protestant orphanage rather than be placed in the charge of the Catholic mother. It attributed no force to the signed promises that the father had made before the marriage nor to the argument that the 1937 Constitution of Ireland, adopted eight years earlier, declared that "the State recognises the Family as the natural primary and fundamental unit group of Society", and that it "acknowledges that the primary and natural educator of the child is the Family". Largely because this judgement ignored the promises made in the prenuptial agreement, it caused deep resentment in Catholic circles.

In 1951 the Irish Supreme Court made a contrary judgement, upholding on appeal a 1950 High Court decision in a suit brought by a Catholic mother seeking the return of the four children whom their Protestant father had placed in a Protestant home to be raised as Protestants. The High Court ruled that the father was bound by the written undertaking he had given before marriage. The Supreme Court directed its attention to whether the prenuptial agreement was binding. Its own reasoning was that, "in upholding the contractual validity of the pre-marriage promise given by [the father, it] was rejecting an archaic principle of British law that would be the object of public scorn if it still applied in Ireland today". It ruled that under the Irish Constitution the parents had "a joint power and duty in respect of the religious education of their children" and that neither parent had a right to dissolve an established contract. The 1950−1951 decision was confirmed in a 1957 ruling of the Irish High Court that was not appealed, and corresponds to a New York court's decree upholding the binding character of such a prenuptial undertaking.

In its 2010 documentary Mixing Marriages, BBC Radio Ulster broadcast an account of how in 1908, although the Ne Temere decree did not declare invalid the marriages previously entered into otherwise than before the parish priest of the Catholic spouse, a Catholic father, who in vain demanded that his Presbyterian wife, whom he had married in a Presbyterian church, repeat the ceremony before a Catholic priest and allow their children to be brought up as Catholics, abandoned her and took away their two small children. Ensuing publicity by the local Presbyterian minister was a factor in turning Presbyterians against Irish Home Rule.

== Matrimonia Mixta (1970) ==
Ne Temere was superseded in 1970 with the motu proprio Matrimonia mixta issued by Pope Paul VI.

The Pope:

1. Took the view that "mixed marriages, precisely because they admit differences of religion and are a consequence of division among Christians, do not, except in some cases, help in re-establishing unity among Christians."
2. Wrote that "there are many difficulties inherent in a mixed marriage, since a certain division is introduced into the living cell of the Church"
3. Added that "in the family itself the fulfilment of the gospel teaching is more difficult because of diversities in matters of religion, especially in regard to those matters which concern Christian worship and the education of the children".
4. Stated that "For these reasons the Church [...] discourages the contracting of mixed marriages, for she is most desirous that Catholics be able in matrimony to attain to perfect union of mind and full communion of life. However since man has the natural right to marry and beget children," the Church wished to make arrangements to ensure "that the principles of divine law be scrupulously observed and that [...] [the] right to contract marriages be respected".
5. Stated that although the Church was relaxing ecclesiastical discipline in particular cases, "she can never remove the obligation of the Catholic party which, by divine law, namely by the plan of salvation instituted by Christ, is imposed according to the various situations".
6. Stressed that "the Catholic partner in a mixed marriage is obliged [...] as far as possible, to see that the children be baptised and brought up in that same faith and receive all those aids to eternal salvation which the Catholic Church provides for her sons and daughters".
7. Noted that "the problem of the children's education is a particularly difficult one, in view of the fact that both husband and wife are bound by that responsibility and may by no means ignore it or any of the obligations connected with it".
8. Acknowledged that in this area "the canonical discipline [...] cannot be uniform" and "must be adapted to [...] the distinct circumstances of the married couple and the differing degrees of their ecclesiastical communion."

Section 15 revoked the automatic latae sententiae excommunication imposed by the 1917 Code of Canon Law for marrying before a non-Catholic minister or for failing to secure the Catholic upbringing of the children. The 1970 apostolic letter made the granting of a dispensation by the Ordinary conditional on a promise by the Catholic spouse to remove all danger of defecting from the faith and to do all that he or she can to have all the children baptized and brought up in the Catholic Church. The non-Catholic partner was to be made aware of these promises made by the Catholic spouse (sections 4 and 5).

This removed the Ne Temere requirement that both the Catholic and non-Catholic spouse must pledge to raise their children as Catholics during the wedding, which was criticized as "legislating for Protestants".

The regulations in Matrimonia mixta have been maintained in the 1983 Code of Canon Law. In 1996, in a letter to the Irish Times, the Director of the Catholic Press and Information Office, Dublin stated "[T]he Catholic Church's current practice in relation to mixed marriages [...] the new [1991] [standard prenuptial inquiry] form includes the following questions to be asked of all Catholics [...] Do you promise to do what you can within the unity of your partnership to have all the children of your marriage baptised and brought up in the Catholic faith? [...] nothing more in the way of undertakings is required of the Catholic partner in a mixed marriage than is required of Catholics marrying one another." The letter therefore makes it clear that nothing less in the way of undertakings was required of the Catholic partner in a mixed marriage than was required of Catholics marrying one another.

In 1972, two years after the abolition of the Ne Temere decree, the New Ulster Movement publication "Two Irelands or one?", commenting also on the related 1957 Fethard-on-Sea boycott, declared: The removal of the protection of the courts, granted since the Tilson judgement of 1950, to the Ne Temere decree of the Catholic Church. This decree which requires the partners in a mixed marriage to promise that all the children of their marriage be brought up as Catholics, is the internal rule of one particular Church. For State organs to support it is, therefore, discriminatory. The NUM dissolved in 1978.

== See also ==
- Elopement
- Clandestinity (canon law)
