= Disparity of cult =

Diriment impediment in Roman Catholic canon law:

Disparity of cult, sometimes called disparity of worship (Disparitas Cultus), is a diriment impediment in Roman Catholic canon law: a reason why a marriage cannot be validly contracted without a dispensation, stemming from one person being certainly baptized, and the other certainly not baptized.

Canon 1086 (C.I.C 1983) reads: "A marriage between two persons, one of whom was baptized in the Catholic Church or received into it, and the other of whom is not baptized, is invalid."

Disparity of cult does not affect the marriage of a Catholic or baptized non-Catholic with one whose baptism, even after careful investigation concerning the baptismal ceremony or its validity, remains doubtful. Neither does it in any way influence the marriage of two who, after diligent examination, are still considered doubtfully baptized.

A marriage between a Catholic and a baptized non-Catholic is a mixed marriage. See canons 1124-29. Though sometimes referred to by this term, the permission of the bishop is required merely to make the union licit; the marriage is valid but illicit without it.

Disparity of cult can be dispensed for grave reasons, and on the promises (usually written) from the spouses: the unbaptized not to interfere with the spouse's practice of religion or the raising of the children in religion, the Catholic to practice the Catholic religion and raise the children in it.
