= Tametsi =

Former Catholic canon law

Tametsi (Latin, "although") is the legislation of the Catholic Church concerning clandestine marriage which was in force from 1563 until Easter 1908. It was named, as is customary in Latin Rite ecclesiastical documents, for the first word of the document that contained it: chapter 1 of the Decretum de reformatione matrimonii of Session 24 of the Council of Trent. It added the impediment of clandestinity and established the canonical form of marriage for validity in the regions in which it was promulgated.

== Clandestinity ==
This was the document that added the impediment of clandestinity to the marriage law of the church. It also resolved a long-standing debate over how canon law should respond to the pastoral problems caused by clandestine marriages. Since the Sacrament of Marriage is administered by the parties to the marriage to each other, and not by clergy, it is unique among the Sacraments. Fear of possible change in this doctrine prompted the debate, since prior to the Council of Trent (1545–1563), clandestine marriages had been considered valid. These marriages had resultant problems – questions over legitimacy of children; difficulties over inheritance, and the potential for conflict between those who considered they had a right to a voice in the matter.

It declared that while the Church has always disapproved of marriages contracted secretly, or without the consent of parents, Tametsi affirmed that clandestine contracts of marriage freely entered into are valid, unless rendered null by the non-observance of regulations made by the Church, and anathematizes those who hold the contrary as well as those who falsely assert the invalidity of a marriage contracted without parents' consent, or who affirm that parents by their approval or disapproval may affect the binding force of such contracts.

== Canonical form of marriage ==
The outcome of Tametsi was to establish a juridical form of marriage. To be considered valid, the marriage required the presence of the parish priest or his deputy authorized by him or the ordinary, and the presence of two or three witnesses. Banns were to be read before the marriage was to take place. For the first time, a record of marriage was to be kept.

A liturgical form for marriage was established. Couples newly married were expected to receive the priestly blessing in the church, having prepared by Confession and Communion.

== Problems with Tametsi ==
Dacanay identifies several problems that occurred as a result of the enactment of Tametsi.

One was that because Tametsi required the presence of the pastor or ordinary of one of the parties to the marriage according to domicile or quasi-domicile, the problem of determining domicile or quasi-domicile arose. Because the competence of the pastor was personal rather than territorial: the pastor had jurisdiction over the marriage depending on whether one or both of the parties had domicile or quasi-domicile in his parish.

Another problem was that the law was not promulgated everywhere and therefore could not be enforced uniformly.

Another problem was that the law gave rise to what Dacanay calls "surprise marriage" because the involvement of the pastor was merely passive. As an example, Dacanay cites the case where the parties to the marriage would break into the priest's residence, wake him up, and express their consent to the marriage even before the priest becomes aware of what just happened.

== Modifications of Tametsi ==
=== The Benedictine Privilege (November 4, 1741) ===
The Benedictine Privilege exempted heretics from the coverage of Tametsi when they were married among themselves or to Catholics.

=== Ne Temere ===
Tametsi was superseded in 1908 by Ne Temere, which stated that a marriage is invalid unless it is contracted before a parish priest in his own parish, or before a bishop in his own diocese, or by a delegate of either; and, as in Tametsi, in the presence of at least two witnesses. Also, the marriage was to be recorded in the parish register of the parish where each party was baptized. Ne Temere also required the priest solemnizing the marriage to ask and receive the parties' consent to the marriage in the name of the Church, and not just receive the parties' consent.

Another modification was that Ne Temere was promulgated everywhere.

== See also ==
- Ne Temere
- Marriage in the Catholic Church
