= Jerry Miles Humphrey =

J. M. (Jerry Miles) Humphrey (born June 30, 1872) was an American Free Methodist author and speaker in the Holiness Movement of the early 20th century. While in ministry, he divorced his wife, and married another woman seven years later. The day after the wedding, he began to harbor doubts about the propriety of this second marriage, and ultimately ended it after two years of soul-searching, which included eighteen months of mutual sexual abstinence. He wrote a testimony regarding the situation, declaring his repentance.

== Publications ==
His published works include:

- Select Fruits from the Highlands of Beulah Lima, Ohio : True Gospel Grain Pub. Co., c1913. 227 p.; 20 cm.
- Crumbs From Heaven
- Sin's By-Paths
- Old-Time Religion
- Impressive Talks
- Fragments From The King's Table
- A Word of Warning on Divorce - Marriage
- Fire from the Pulpit
- X-ray Sermons Omaha, Neb., "Anywhere" evangelistic workers’ publishing house [c1924] 247 p. 20 cm.
- Daily Guide for the Sanctified Chicago, Ill., The Christian witness co. [c1917] 4 p. l., 7-147 p. 19½ cm.
- Railroad Sermons from Railroad Stories Chicago, Ill., Messenger publishing company, 1917. 84 p. 18 cm..
- The Worker's Secret Of Unction
- Spiritual Lessons From Every-day Life
- Fifty Ready-Cut Sermons
- Gleanings from Emmanuel’s Land Lima, Ohio, True Gospel Grain Pub. Co., 1911. 63, [1] p. 18 cm.
- Echoes from Three Worlds: Sacred Poems Cleveland, Ohio : True Gospel Grain Pub. Co., c1908. 78 p.; 18 cm.
- A Soul's First Day in Heaven
- The Lost Soul’s First Day in Eternity , c1912.
- Sermons That Never Die, Allegheny Publications (January 1, 1990)
- Revival Fire in Song

He also wrote lyrics for several hymns.
