= Natural marriage =

Catholic doctrine on non-sacramental marriage

In Catholic canon law, natural marriage is the covenant "by which a man and a woman establish between themselves a partnership of the whole of life and which is ordered by its nature to the good of the spouses and the procreation and education of offspring". It is distinguished from a sacramental or Christian marriage, in which the two parties involved are baptized.

== Valid baptism a condition for Christian marriage ==
Since only the baptized can receive the other sacraments, the marriage of someone who has accepted Christian beliefs but has not been baptized is non-sacramental. Similarly, the marriage of a person whose baptism the Catholic Church judges to be invalid is a non-sacramental natural marriage. Examples of such baptisms considered invalid are those of the Mormons and the Jehovah's Witnesses.

A marriage of two baptized Protestants, even if the church or churches they belong to and they themselves deny that marriage is a sacrament, and even if they contract marriage only civilly and not in church (they are not bound to observe the form that is obligatory for Catholics), is a sacramental marriage, not a merely natural marriage.

== Transformation into sacramental marriage ==
The marriage that a non-baptized person, of whatever religion or belief, contracts, even with a baptized person, is a non-sacramental natural marriage. However, if the non-baptized person or persons are later baptized, the existing marriage automatically becomes sacramental and no longer merely natural.

== Conditions for natural marriage ==
If a Catholic marries a non-Catholic, the marriage is subject to Catholic canon law on impediments to marriage. If no Catholic is involved, the only impediments that apply are impediments affecting the very definition of marriage (such as if consent, diversity of sex, ability to consummate the marriage are lacking, or in the presence of an already existing marriage bond) and impediments that are considered part of natural law (such as a father-daughter relationship).

Any marriage that is non-monogamous (polygamy), non-heterosexual (same-sex marriage), or involves non-humans (zoophilia) is an invalid attempt at marriage according to natural law.

== Natural marriage and divorce ==
"The Catholic Church does not recognize or endorse civil divorce of a natural marriage as of a sacramental marriage". However, a natural marriage, even if consummated, can be dissolved by the Church when to do so favours the maintenance of the faith on the part of a Christian, cases of what has been called Pauline privilege and Petrine privilege. In these cases, which require intervention by the Holy See, the Church admits real divorce, actual dissolution of a valid marriage, as distinct from the granting by merely human power of a divorce that, according to Catholic theology, does not really dissolve the marriage bond.
