= Clandestinity (Catholic canon law) =

Diriment impediment in the canon law of the Catholic Church

Clandestinity is a diriment impediment in the canon law of the Catholic Church. It invalidates a marriage performed without the presence of three witnesses, one of whom must be a priest or a deacon.

== History ==
It was promulgated in the 16th century by the Council of Trent in the decree called Tametsi. Prior to that time, an unwitnessed exchange of marriage vows was deplored but valid. The decree was enforced only in those regions where it could be proclaimed in the vernacular.

The witnesses must be the parish priest or another priest, with permission either from the parish priest or the local ordinary, and the other two witnesses must be capable of giving witness to the marriage vows.

It was later modified by the decree Ne Temere, to require specific priests, such as the local pastor of the couple's residence. It further stated that marriages ought to be celebrated in the parish of the bride.

Further modifications provided that the priest was not necessary if one of the marrying parties was in danger of death or if the vows could not be exchanged before a priest in a reasonable amount of time.

== See also ==
- Morganatic marriage
- Annulment (Catholic Church)
