= Pauline privilege =

Catholic Church's dissolution of the marriage of spouses married when upbaptized

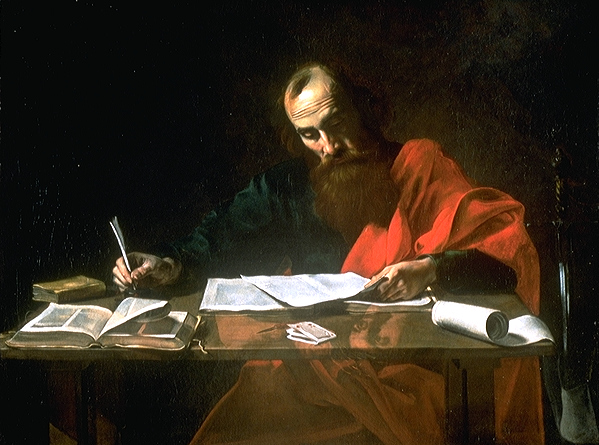
St Paul Writing His Epistles by Valentin de Boulogne

The Pauline privilege (Latin: privilegium Paulinum) is the allowance by the Catholic Church of the dissolution of marriage of two persons not baptized at the time the marriage occurred. The Pauline privilege is drawn from the Apostle Paul's instructions in the First Epistle to the Corinthians.

== Origin ==
The Pauline privilege is the allowance by the Church of the dissolution of marriage of two persons not baptized at the time the marriage occurred.

1 Corinthians 7:10–15 states:

To the married I give charge, not I but the Lord, that the wife should not separate from her husband (but if she does, let her remain single or else be reconciled to her husband) --and that the husband should not divorce his wife. To the rest I say, not the Lord, that if any brother has a wife who is an unbeliever, and she consents to live with him, he should not divorce her. If any woman has a husband who is an unbeliever, and he consents to live with her, she should not divorce him. For the unbelieving husband is consecrated through his wife, and the unbelieving wife is consecrated through her husband. Otherwise, your children would be unclean, but as it is they are holy. 15 But if the unbelieving partner desires to separate, let it be so; in such a case the brother or sister is not bound. For God has called us to peace."

The first section, "not I but the Lord", roughly matches Jesus' teaching on divorce, found in an antithesis (Matthew 5:32) with parallels in Matthew 19:9, Luke 16:18, and Mark 10:11. The second section, "I say, not the Lord", gives Paul's own teaching on divorce, and was initiated to address a serious pastoral problem in the Church in Corinth where problems apparently developed in marriages between believers and unbelievers. Therefore, in instances where the unbaptized spouse left the newly baptized spouse, Paul allowed the latter to enter into a new marriage.

In the Catholic Church and in some Protestant denominations this is interpreted as allowing the dissolution of a marriage between two non-baptized persons in the case that one (but not both) of the partners seeks baptism and converts to Christianity and the other partner leaves the marriage. Assuming it is established that both spouses were un-baptized at the time of their marriage, and subsequently obtained a civil divorce, should the now baptized party wish to enter into a sacramental marriage, the Pauline Privilege ("in favor of the faith") takes place ipso facto at the time of that marriage.

In the Latin Church, the subject is covered in canons 1143–1147 and can be handled on the diocesan level. For the Eastern Catholic Churches the applicable canons are found in the Code of Canons of the Eastern Churches, canons 854–858.

According to the Catholic Church's canon law, the Pauline privilege does not apply when either of the partners was a Christian at the time of marriage. It differs from annulment because it dissolves a valid natural (but not sacramental) marriage whereas an annulment declares that a marriage was invalid from the beginning.

The related Petrine privilege, which also allows remarriage after divorce, may be invoked if only one of the partners was baptized at the time of the first marriage.

== See also ==
- Christian views on divorce
- Pauline Christianity
