= Petrine privilege =

Provision in Catholic canon law

Petrine privilege, also known as the privilege of the faith or favor of the faith, is a ground recognized in Catholic canon law allowing for dissolution by the Pope of a valid natural marriage between a baptized and a non-baptized person for the sake of the salvation of the soul of someone who is thus enabled to marry in the Church.

In essence, it is an extension to marriages between a baptised and a non-baptized person of the logic of the Pauline privilege, the latter being dissolution of a marriage between two non-baptized persons to enable one of them, on becoming a Christian, to enter a Christian marriage.

According to Canon 1150 of the 1983 Code of Canon Law, the privilege of the faith "possesses the favor of law". In other words, whenever it is possible that the privilege is applicable, the law favors its granting. Nevertheless, dissolution of a marriage in favor of the faith, which is seen as having a biblical precedent in Jews putting away their non-Jewish wives recounted in Ezra 10:1–14, is rarely used.

== Terminology ==
While the Pauline privilege is so named in reference to the instructions of Saint Paul in 1 Corinthians 7:12–15, the term "Petrine privilege", which was coined by Franz Hürth in his 1946 lectures on the Holy See's norms and practice, refers not to any rule given by Saint Peter, but to an exercise of authority by the Pope as successor of Saint Peter.

Canonists now generally consider inappropriate the term "Petrine privilege" (as opposed to "privilege or favour of the faith"), but it remains in common use.

== Natural marriage ==
The kind of marriage to which the "favor of the faith" applies is a valid natural marriage. Baptism is required for valid reception of the other sacraments, and because in marriage two people are involved together, if either of them is not baptized, there is no sacrament. A natural marriage, while recognized as valid, is classified as not confirmed (non ratum) and can be dissolved for the sake of the higher good of a person's faith.

If at any time, even after separation, the non-baptized party receives baptism, the marriage becomes sacramental and the "favor of the faith" no longer applies. However, if the husband and wife do not have marital intercourse after both become baptized persons, a marriage thus confirmed but not consummated (ratum sed non consummatum) can still, for a just cause, be dissolved in accordance with canon 1142 of the Code of Canon Law.

== History ==
In response to the missionary growth of the 16th century, the popes (primarily Paul III, Altitudo, 1 June 1537; St Pius V, Romani Pontifices, 2 August 1571; and Gregory XIII, Populis, 25 January 1585) developed new norms in order to deal with polygamists, whereby a number of new "privileges" were approved that went well beyond those provided for by the Pauline privilege. The 1917 Code of Canon Law extended these to the whole Church, and the great increase of mixed marriages and of divorce in the 20th century has greatly increased pastoral needs in relation to marriage. Accordingly, the governing norms have continued to undergo development.

A precedent was set when in 1924 Pope Pius XI dissolved the 1919 marriage of Gerard G. Marsh (unbaptized) and Frances E. Groom (a baptized Anglican) of Helena, Montana, who were civilly divorced a year later. This was done to favor Marsh's marriage to Lulu LaHood, a Catholic. Cases became so numerous that, in 1934, the Holy Office issued "Norms for the Dissolution of Marriage in Favor of the Faith by the Supreme Authority of the Sovereign Pontiff". These applied even when the baptized party was a Catholic who had married a non-baptized person after obtaining a dispensation so as to enter into a valid natural marriage. On 6 December 1973, new norms were issued revising those of 1934. These in turn were replaced by a revised text on 30 April 2001.

== Conditions ==
The petitioner (one of the parties in the marriage to be dissolved):

- if baptized and Catholic at the time of the marriage in question, must intend to marry a baptized Christian (soon after or in the future).
- if non-baptized or baptized in another Christian Church, must either

- intend to enter the Catholic Church or be baptized in it, or
- intend to marry a baptized practicing Catholic.

== See also ==
- Christian views on divorce
- Pauline privilege
