= Declaration of nullity =

Catholic judgement that a marriage is invalid

In the Catholic Church, a declaration of nullity, commonly called an annulment and less commonly a decree of nullity, and in some cases, a Catholic divorce, is an ecclesiastical tribunal determination and judgment that a marriage was invalidly contracted or, less frequently, a judgment that ordination was invalidly conferred.

A matrimonial nullity trial, governed by canon law, is a judicial process whereby a canonical tribunal determines whether the marriage was void at its inception (ab initio). A "Declaration of Nullity" is not the dissolution of an existing marriage (as is a dispensation from a marriage ratum sed non consummatum and an "annulment" in civil law), but rather a determination that consent was never validly exchanged due to a failure to meet the requirements to enter validly into matrimony and thus a marriage never existed.

The Catholic Church teaches that, in a true marriage, one man and one woman become "one flesh" before the eyes of God. Various impediments can render a person unable to validly contract a marriage. Besides impediments, marriage consent can be rendered null due to invalidating factors such as simulation or deceit, or due to psychological incapacity.

For this reason (amongst others) the Church, after an examination of the situation by the competent ecclesiastical tribunal, can declare the nullity of a marriage, i.e., that the marriage never existed. In this case the contracting parties are free to marry, provided the natural obligations of a previous union are discharged.

— Catechism of the Catholic Church (CCC 1629)

In 2015, the process for declaring matrimonial nullity was amended by the matrimonial nullity trial reforms of Pope Francis, the broadest reforms to matrimonial nullity law in 300 years. Prior to the reforms, a declaration of nullity could only be effective if it had been so declared by two tribunals at different levels of jurisdiction. If the lower courts (First and Second Instance) were not in agreement, the case went automatically to the Roman Rota for final decision.

== Reasons for nullity ==
Certain conditions are necessary for the marriage contract to be valid in canon law. According to Matthew 19:5–6 and 1 Corinthians 7:10–11, the Church cannot separate what has been united by God, but with his aid can rule that a marriage has been null since the time of its celebration. The lack of any of these conditions makes a marriage invalid and constitutes legal grounds for a declaration of nullity. Accordingly, apart from the question of diriment impediments dealt with below, there is a fourfold classification of contractual defects: defect of form, defect of contract, defect of willingness, defect of capacity. For a declaration of nullity, proof is required of the existence of one of these defects, since canon law presumes all marriages are valid until proven otherwise.

=== Defect of canonical form ===
Members of the Catholic Church are required by Can. 1108 to marry in canonical form. That means that the marriage of a Catholic is valid only if it is contracted before the local ordinary (e.g. the bishop), the parish priest or a cleric deputed by either of them and two other witnesses are present. The cleric is not the minister of the sacrament; the husband and wife are the ministers by exchanging vows, though the cleric presides over the exchange of the vows and any mass or nuptial liturgical celebration. If one of the parties is Catholic, but there is a serious reason why the marriage should be celebrated in a civil ceremony or in front of a non-Catholic minister, a dispensation can be granted according to Can. 1127 § 2. If no dispensation was granted in advance and the couple – one of them being a Catholic at the time of the wedding – did not observe the canonical form, the marriage is considered invalid in the eyes of the church.

Because "[m]arriage possesses the favor of law" according to Can. 1060, a declaration of nullity by the proper ecclesiastical authority is necessary to prove that the marriage was indeed invalid due to a defect of form. This is the case, e.g., when a couple marries before a priest who did not have the proper authority to witness weddings, or before an insufficient number of witnesses.

However, in situations where there was a complete absence of the canonical form (e.g. if the marriage was concluded in a civil ceremony) and a Catholic later wants to get married in canonical form to a different person, no formal judicial process is required beyond the prenuptial investigation mandated by can. 1066–1067. However, in may dioceses, particular law requires these "lack of form" cases to be handled at the tribunal instead.

If a couple which was married without adherence to the proper canonical form later wants to rectify the lack of form and be married validly in the eyes of the church, the marriage can be regularized by being contracted again in canonical form.

=== Impediments ===
If one of the parties were prohibited from marrying by a diriment impediment (from the Latin for "interrupting"), the marriage is invalid. Because these impediments may not be known at all, the marriage is called a putative marriage if at least one of the parties married in good faith.

Diriment impediments include:

- One or both parties is below the absolute minimum age of 16 for males and 14 for females
- Antecedent and perpetual impotence (not to be confused with sterility)
- Ligamen, or being already validly married
- The situation in which one party is a Catholic and the other has not been baptized (unless a dispensation is granted)
- The man was ordained to holy orders
- Either party made a public perpetual vow of chastity in a religious institute
- Abduction with the intent of marriage (known as raptus), is an impediment as long as the person remains in the kidnapper's power
- Impediment of Crime, bringing about the death of one's spouse, or the spouse of another, with the intention of marriage
- Consanguinity, or close relationship by blood, even if the relationship is only by law
- Affinity, or close relationship by marriage

Some of these laws can be relaxed by a dispensation before the ceremony. For example, Catherine of Aragon and Henry VIII of England received a dispensation from the impediment of affinity (Catherine had previously been married to Henry's brother Arthur, who died). Henry later based his request for annulment from Catherine (which largely led to the reformation of the Church of England) on the grounds that the dispensation was improperly given in that his father, Henry VII, had pressured the Archbishop of Canterbury into granting it.

The correction of this invalidity after the marriage requires first that the impediment has ceased or has been dispensed, and then a "convalidation" can take place or a sanatio in radice can be granted to make the marriage valid.

=== Consensual grounds for nullity ===
A marriage may be declared invalid because at least one of the two parties did not give free and sufficient consent to marriage.

Grounds for nullity include:

- Simulation of consent; that is, the conscious and positive exclusion at consent by either or both of the contracting parties of marriage or one of the essentials of marriage: a) exclusivity of the marital relationship; b) the indissolubility of the marital bond; c) openness to offspring as the natural fruit of marriage (canon 1101§2)
- Deliberate deceit about some personal quality that can objectively and gravely perturb conjugal life, perpetrated for the purpose of obtaining consent (canon 1098)
- Conditional consent, if the condition at the time of marriage concerns the future, or if it concerns the past or present and is actually unfulfilled (canon 1102)
- Force or grave fear imposed on a person to obtain their consent (canon 1103)
- A grave defect of discretion of judgment at consent concerning the essential matrimonial rights and duties mutually to be handed over and accepted (canon 1095 n.2)
- Psychic incapacity at consent to undertake the essential obligations of marriage (canon 1095 n.3).
- Error about the identity of the other spouse (c. 1097)

According to Canon 1095 a marriage can be declared null only when consent was given in the presence of some grave lack of discretionary judgment regarding the essential rights and obligations of marriage, or of some real incapacity to assume these essential obligations. This is verified only when a party was suffering from a serious psychic anomaly. Pope Benedict XVI in his address to the Roman Rota in 2009, echoing words of his predecessor John Paul II, has criticized "the exaggerated and almost automatic multiplication of declarations of nullity of marriage in cases of the failure of marriage on the pretext of some immaturity or psychic weakness on the part of the contracting parties". Calling for "the reaffirmation of the innate human capacity for matrimony", he insisted on the point made in 1987 by John Paul II that "only incapacity and not difficulty in giving consent invalidates a marriage".

== Process ==
Marriages declared null under the Catholic Church are considered as void ab initio, meaning that the marriage was invalid from the beginning. Some worry that their children will be considered illegitimate if they get an annulment. However, Canon 1137 of the 1983 Code of Canon Law specifically affirms the legitimacy of children born in both valid and putative marriages (objectively invalid, though at least one party celebrated in good faith). Critics point to this as additional evidence that a Catholic annulment is similar to divorce; although civil laws regard the offspring of all marriages as legitimate.

However, there are some significant differences between divorce and annulment. Divorce is concerned merely with the legal effects of marriage. Annulment, however, is also concerned with the reality of whether or not a true marriage was ever formed. This leads to the second difference. At least in most countries, divorce is always possible. However, not all applications for marriage nullity are granted.

An annulment from the Catholic Church is independent from obtaining a civil annulment (or, in some cases, a divorce). Although, before beginning an annulment process before an ecclesiastical tribunal, it has to be clear that the marriage cannot be rebuilt. Some countries, such as Italy, allow the annulment process to substitute for the civil act of divorce. In many jurisdictions, some of the grounds the Catholic Church recognizes as sufficient for annulment are not considered grounds for a civil annulment. In such cases, the couple will often need to be divorced by the civil authorities to be able to remarry in the jurisdiction. Once the Church annuls a marriage it would generally prefer that the marriage be subsequently annulled by the civil courts. However, should this not prove feasible, a civil divorce is acceptable.

If someone has been married previously and the first spouse is still alive, he or she must have received a declaration of nullity before entering into a marriage in the Catholic Church, even if neither party in the marriage was Catholic (privilege of faith being separate cases). The Catholic Church treats as indissoluble and valid every marriage when it is the first marriage for both parties. However, the church does not recognise as valid a marriage when one of the parties is Catholic but the marriage was not celebrated before a Catholic priest (unless a dispensation was first obtained).

Canon law presumes that all marriages are valid until proven otherwise. Annulment respondents who want to use canon law to defend their marriage against declarations of invalidity have the right to have a competent advocate assisting them. An advocate is like a lawyer. Respondents have the right to read the petition (called libellus, meaning "little book") of the petitioner. The petition must describe, in a general way, the facts and proofs that the petitioner is using as the basis for alleging that parties' marriage is invalid. It is necessary that tribunal judges study the jurisprudence of the Roman Rota, since the rota is responsible to promote the unity of jurisprudence and, through its own sentences, to be of assistance to lower tribunals (Dignitas Connubii, art. 35, citing Pastor bonus, art.126). Annulment respondents can use case law from the Roman Rota to support their defense of marriage.

In order to obtain a declaration of nullity, the parties must approach a Catholic diocesan tribunal. Most applications for nullity that are heard by the tribunal are granted because one or both of the parties are judged to have given invalid consent (see above). In order to give valid consent, the parties must give it freely. They must have a basic ability to understand what they are doing and to evaluate their decision to enter marriage (1983 CIC, Canon 1095). They must be capable of fulfilling the promises they make on the wedding day; that is, not suffer from any psychological infirmity (Canon 1095) that will prevent them from giving themselves in a partnership of the whole of life that has as its ends the good of the spouses and the procreation and education of children (canon 1055). They must not exclude any of the essential elements or properties of marriage: its indissolubility, its unity, or its orientation towards the good of the spouses and towards the procreation of children (canon 1101). Serious defects in these areas can allow a possible successful application for marriage nullity. There are other reasons that might justify an allegation of invalid consent, such as a serious error concerning the person to whom marriage promises are made (Canon 1097), one party being seriously deceived by the other at the time of the wedding (Canon 1098) or one of the parties being subjected to force or grave fear without which the marriage would not be occurring (Canon 1103).

Church tribunals are courts. As with any court, the person bringing the matter before the judges must prove his or her case; advocates and Tribunals will advise applicants as to how they can present the evidence necessary to prove a case.

The trial begins when the petitioning spouse presents an accusation before the tribunal and the tribunal cites the respondent spouse. One or more grounds of nullity to be investigated will be determined. The judges make their investigation by hearing the parties and witnesses, reviewing documents, and hearing any experts. Both spouses have the right to intervene in the trial equally. They can review the evidence in the trial and offer arguments in favor of their position. These rights are shared by a third party to the trial: the defender of the bond. The defender of the bond is a Church official whose task is to defend the marriage bond against unfounded accusations of nullity.

An affirmative decision is granted when the majority of judges reaches "moral certainty" that the petitioner proved his case. Moral certainty is the absence of any prudent doubt. It is a higher standard than mere probability ("x is probably true"). However, absolute certainty is not required ("the contrary of x is impossible"). The parties and defender of the bond can appeal the final decision to a higher instance court.

Approximately 94% of petitions filed in the United States are granted, and although the United States has only 6% of the world's Catholics, it accounts for 60% of the annulments granted worldwide, leading Bai MacFarlane to suggest that the Church cooperates with the "evil of no-fault divorce". Pope John Paul II expressed concern over the relative ease with which an annulment can be obtained in the United States. The tribunal judges are tasked with distinguishing those unions that were flawed from the outset from those valid marriages that have broken down.

== Numbers ==
Worldwide, diocesan tribunals completed over 49,000 cases for nullity of marriage in 2006. Over the past 30 years about 55 to 70% of annulments have occurred in the United States. The growth in annulments has been substantial; in the United States, 27,000 marriages were declared null in 2006, compared to 338 in 1968.

== Other considerations ==
Pope John Paul II and Pope Benedict XVI were worried about the ease with which annulments were being granted, especially when premised on ill-defined grounds such as "immaturity or psychic weakness" or "psychic immaturity", an expression of concern that the term "annulment" is being regarded as synonymous with "divorce".

Pope Francis expressed worries over the fact that probably "half of all marriages are null" in the light of canon law. This observation was one of the reasons for calling an extraordinary synod of bishops on the family in October 2014. Pope Francis later reformed the matrimonial nullity trial process in 2015.

A declaration of nullity made by the Catholic Church is distinct from a civil divorce. A civil divorce may serve as proof for the ecclesiastical tribunal that the marriage cannot be rebuilt. In some countries, such as Italy, in which Catholic Church marriages are automatically transcribed to the civil records, a Church declaration of nullity may be granted the exequatur and treated as the equivalent of a civil divorce.

== Catholic view of Eastern Orthodox process ==
=== Annulments granted by Eastern Orthodox tribunals ===
The Code of Canons of the Eastern Churches (CCEO), the body of Eastern Catholic canon law for the Eastern Catholic Churches, in Canon 780 follows the Second Vatican Council's teaching that the tribunals of the Eastern Orthodox Churches have a valid annulment process to declare a marriage null. If an Orthodox tribunal holds that the marriage was invalid from its inception, that decision would be accepted by a marriage tribunal in the Catholic Church.

=== Eastern Orthodox economy ===
Some of the Eastern Orthodox Churches allow a second or third marriage in oikonomia ("economy"), which is not permitted in the Catholic Church. This concept states that the first marriage was valid and the second is allowed in the economy of salvation. The Catholic Church would see this as contrary to divine law and therefore invalid. The same impediment would exist as with divorce or "dissolution" of a bond (annulment) that is not in the favor of the faith.

== Declaration of nullity of ordination ==
The term "declaration of nullity" can also apply to cases in which ordinations are invalidly conferred.

== Notable Catholic annulments ==
- The marriage of US Senator Ted Kennedy and his first wife, Joan, was declared null after Ted claimed he had not been truthful at the time of getting married when he vowed to be faithful to his spouse.
- Joseph Kennedy II's marriage to Sheila Rauch Kennedy was declared null after he claimed lack of mental fitness to enter into the marriage; this annulment was later appealed by Sheila to the Vatican, which overturned the ruling in 2007.
- Eadwig, King of the English, had his marriage to Ælfgifu, declared null on grounds that they were too closely related.
- Louis VII of France and Eleanor of Aquitaine had their marriage declared null by a papal court in 1152 as they were distant cousins, after the birth of two daughters and despite a proclamation by Pope Eugene III in 1149 that no word could be spoken against their marriage and that it might not be dissolved under any pretext; each would go on to marry closer cousins.

== Recent controversies regarding the granting of annulments in Catholicism ==
Popes Benedict XVI and John Paul II criticized the Catholic Church on the issue of the overuse of annulments to marriage, but Francis made changes to canon law to make it easier to get annulments. He also asked dioceses to charge no fees for annulments "insofar as possible."

== See also ==
- Catholic doctrine regarding the Ten Commandments
