= Common-law marriage in the United States =

Common-law marriage is a legally recognized form of marriage in only seven of the fifty states within United States. It is formed without the same formalities as a regular marriage — without a license or a formal ceremony. Common-law marriage has three requirements: (1) the couple lives together in an intimate relationship, (2) the couple agree that they are married, and (3) the couple presents themselves to the public as a married couple. It survives in only seven U.S. states as of 2022: Colorado, Iowa, Kansas, Montana, Rhode Island, Oklahoma, Texas and the District of Columbia along with some provisions of military law. Further, three other states, Utah, South Carolina, and New Hampshire recognize domestic common law marriage after the fact for limited purposes.

Disputes over common-law marriage arise in two contexts — first, when the two parties end the relationship, one may claim they were married while the other may say they were only living together; and second, when one party dies, the other may claim inheritance or benefits from the employer or insurance. Because a common-law marriage is a form of lawful marriage, it cannot be ended by separation alone. There is no such thing as "common law divorce"; it requires a legal divorce and formal judicial proceeding. So although it is possible to be married by common law in nine U.S. jurisdictions, divorce must be done by statutory law in all jurisdictions.

The fact that a couple is cohabitating for a certain number of years — even if they buy a home together or have children together — is by itself not sufficient to establish a common-law marriage. Despite this, the term common law marriage is often improperly used colloquially or by the media to refer to cohabiting couples, which can create public confusion both in regard to the term and in regard to the legal rights of unmarried partners. Common-law marriage is also known as informal marriage, or marriage in fact.

== Origin of common-law marriage in the United States ==
It is sometimes mistakenly claimed that, before England's Marriage Act 1753, cohabiting couples in Britain would enjoy the protection of a "common-law marriage". In fact, neither the name nor the concept of "common-law marriage" was known at this time. Far from being treated as if they were married, couples known to be cohabiting risked prosecution by the church courts for fornication.

The Marriage Act 1753 also did not apply to Britain's overseas colonies of the time, and common-law marriages continued to be recognized in what became the United States and Canada. Although it is claimed that common-law marriage in the US originated in English common-law, this institution in the United States appears to have originated in the harsh conditions of colonial America where the presence of relatively few clerics or civil officials necessitated a substitute for ceremonial marriage, and the need expanded as the settlers moved into the sparsely populated regions of the West.

== Contractibility of domestic common law marriage ==
A domestic common law marriage is contracted within a particular jurisdiction. If contracted in a different jurisdiction, it is a foreign common law marriage, just like any type of regular marriage contracted out-of-state.

In 1855, defending the idea of common law marriage, a New York judge described marriage as "the most sacred" of social relationships and said that society would be threatened "if an open and public cohabitation as man and wife for 10 years...followed by the procreation of children, could be overturned."

The following U.S. states continue to recognize common law marriages, albeit with varying requirements:

1. Colorado
2. The District of Columbia
3. Iowa
4. Kansas
5. Montana
6. Oklahoma; but as noted, status may be unclear.
7. Rhode Island
8. Texas

Two other jurisdictions recognize domestic common law marriage in limited circumstances:

1. New Hampshire recognizes domestic common law marriage for purposes of probate only.
2. Utah recognizes only common law marriages that have been validated in a judicial proceeding. A common law marriage may be validated by a court of law up to one year after the alleged marriage has been terminated.

Of the remaining 41 states, 13 never permitted and 28 no longer permit common law marriages to be contracted within their jurisdiction. The latter group will only recognize a domestic common law marriage if it was contracted in the state prior to the date of abolition. Nevertheless, all states recognise validly contracted foreign common law marriages, because they recognize all validly contracted foreign marriages. For example, California abolished the common law contract of marriage in 1895 and, thus, will only continue to recognize a domestic common law marriage contracted in California prior to that date; but any validly contracted out-of-state common law marriage will be recognized by California, because it recognizes all validly contracted foreign marriages under Cal. Family Code 308.

Domestic contract of common law marriage was abolished in 28 states on the dates indicated. Massachusetts (which included Maine, 1652–1820) abolished common law marriage during the colonial period and before it was abolished in England and Wales.

- Alabama (2016)
- Alaska (1917), as the Territory of Alaska
- Arizona (1913), part of New Mexico Territory 1850–1863; then the Territory of Arizona to 1912
- California (1895)
- Florida (1968)
- Georgia (1997)
- Hawaii, as the Territory of Hawaii (1920); previously the independent Kingdom of Hawaii, to 1893; then Republic of Hawaii, 1894–1898.
- Idaho (1996)
- Illinois (1905)
- Indiana (1958)
- Kentucky (1852)
- Maine (1652, when it became part of the Massachusetts Bay Colony; it became a separate state in 1820)
- Massachusetts (1646)
- Michigan (1957)
- Minnesota (1941)
- Mississippi (1956)
- Missouri (1921)
- Nebraska (1923)
- Nevada (1943)
- New Jersey (1939)
- New Mexico (1860), as the Territory of New Mexico, a state from 1912
- New York (1933, also 1902–1908),
- North Dakota (1890)
- Ohio (1991)
- Pennsylvania (2005) – Common-law marriages existing as of January 1, 2005, remain valid.
- South Carolina (2019)
- South Dakota (1959)
- Wisconsin (1917)

These 13 states have never permitted domestic common law marriage; but like all 50 states and the District of Columbia, they recognise all validly contracted out-of-state marriages, including validly contracted common law marriages.

- Arkansas
- Connecticut
- Delaware
- Louisiana
- Maryland
- North Carolina
- Oregon
- Tennessee
- Vermont
- Virginia
- Washington
- West Virginia
- Wyoming

Outside of confederation, the Territory of Guam does not recognise common law marriage. The Commonwealth of the Northern Mariana Islands also does not recognise common law marriage but might recognise customary marriage. In Santos v. Commonwealth, Petitioner argued that common law marriage was sufficiently similar to Carolinian customary marriage that it should be recognised as the same. The Court ruled that, while CNMI statute provides that (English) common law provides the rule of decision in the absence of statutory law or customary law to the contrary, Petitioner did not argue that her marriage was a marriage under customary law but a marriage under common law; thus, whereas a validly contracted marriage under Carolinian or Chamorro customary law might be held a valid marriage, a common law marriage could not be.

Marriage under tribal law is distinct from state marriage law. Many indigenous nations permit common law marriage or its historic tribal equivalent. For example, the Navajo Nation permits common law marriage and also allows its citizens to marry through tribal ceremonial processes and traditional processes. Otherwise, common law marriages can no longer be contracted in any of the other states.

== Proof a common law marriage exists or existed ==
Because there is no marriage certificate or other public record to directly document the marriage, it can be difficult to prove a common law marriage if marital validity is contested in a probate or dissolution proceeding. Similar problems of proof may arise if the parties to a common law marriage were not actually domiciled in the state where they lived at the time they sought to contract the marriage; or they may have thought they were contracting a marriage but they did not actually conform to the law of the state in which they were living. The essential question is whether the marriage was validly contracted under the laws of the jurisdiction where the parties allege their marriage was contracted.

Court have held that "A claim of common-law marriage is regarded with suspicion and is closely scrutinized." Further, the burden of proof is on the person claiming the existence of a common-law marriage to prove it by a preponderance of evidence.

=== Intent to be married ===
In the case In Re: the Marriage of Edi L. Hogsett (2021), in evaluating whether a common-law marriage existed, the court stated that "The core query is whether the parties intended to enter a marital relationship—that is, to share a life together as spouses in a committed, intimate relationship of mutual support and obligation." Further, "courts should accord weight to evidence reflecting a couple's express agreement to marry." The court noted "the centrality of the couple's mutual consent or agreement to marry" while emphasizing that "a mutual agreement to marry does not alone suffice; there must be some evidence of subsequent conduct manifesting that agreement."

=== Presenting as a married couple to the public ===
In the case Murphy v. City of Cedar Rapids, after a man died from a work injury, his girlfriend filed a claim seeking surviving spouse benefits, stating the couple had a common-law marriage. A city commissioner denied the claim after determining that neither of the couple "held themselves out as being married to any governmental entity or the public". The girlfriend sued and on appeal, the court noted the three requirements to show a common-law marriage as including a "public declaration that the parties are husband and wife"; the court added that "The public declaration or holding out to the public is considered to be the acid test of a common-law marriage ... In other words, there can be no secret common-law marriage." The court found that the couple introduced each other as boyfriend/girlfriend and not as husband/wife, nor did they present themselves as a married couple when they bought a house or filed their taxes.

The court found a common-law marriage where the couple had not officially had a formal marriage ceremony but had numerous indicators of marriage, including: a wedding ring and receipt of wedding gifts; telling people in the community that they were married and public perception that they were married; the woman's use of the husband's name; including mail, travel documents, and hotel reservations under the names Mr. and Mrs.; and joint financial accounts.

== Interjurisdictional recognition ==
All U.S. jurisdictions recognize all validly contracted out-of-state marriages under their laws of comity and choice of law/conflict of laws rules - including marriages that cannot be legally contracted domestically. Likewise, an invalidly contracted out-of-state marriage will not be valid domestically, even if it could have been validly contracted domestically. For example, California allows first cousins to marry but Nevada does not. If two first cousins attempt to marry in Nevada, that marriage will not be valid in either Nevada or California, notwithstanding it could be legally contracted in California. But if they attempt to marry in California, their attempt will be successful and the marriage will be valid in both California and Nevada, notwithstanding the marriage could not be legally contracted in Nevada. (The Full Faith and Credit Clause of the United States Constitution does not apply to common law marriages because they are not public acts (i.e., statutes, ordinances, general laws, etc.), not public records, and not judicial proceedings.)

== Federal income tax and other provisions ==
If the marriage is recognized under the law and customs of the state or jurisdiction in which the marriage takes place (even in a foreign country), the marriage is valid for tax purposes (Rev. Rul. 58-66). Specific state or jurisdiction requirements for a common law marriage to be recognised must be considered by couples contemplating filing joint returns.

In February 2015, the United States Department of Labor issued an amended definition of "spouse" under the Family and Medical Leave Act of 1993 (FMLA) in response to the United States v. Windsor decision recognizing same-sex marriage. The new DOL rule became effective March 27, 2015, and extends FMLA leave rights and job protections to eligible employees in a same-sex marriage or a common law marriage entered into in a state or jurisdiction where those statuses are legally recognized, regardless of the state in which the employee currently works or resides.

== States that permit common-law marriage ==
Colorado, Montana, and Texas are the only U.S. states to recognize both putative marriage and common law marriage.

The requirements to contract a valid common law marriage differ between jurisdictions as follows:

=== Colorado ===
Colorado's Supreme Court revised the elements for common law marriage in three related rulings on January 11, 2021, in light of Obergefell v. Hodges, 576 U.S. 644, 674–75 (2015), and also in light of changing social practices, in the cases of In re Marriage of Hogsett & Neale, 2021 CO 1 (January 11, 2021), In re Estate of Yudkin, 2021 CO 2 (January 11, 2021), and In re Marriage of LaFleur & Pyfer, 2021 CO 3 (January 11, 2021). The Colorado Bar Association summarizes the holding of the cases in a summary of the lead case, Hodges, which states:

The Supreme Court revisited the test for proving a common law marriage ... the Court refined the test and held that a common law marriage may be established by the mutual consent or agreement of the couple to enter the legal and social institution of marriage, followed by conduct manifesting that mutual agreement. The core inquiry is whether the parties intended to enter a marital relationship, that is, to share a life together as spouses in a committed, intimate relationship of mutual support and obligation.

=== District of Columbia ===
According to the District of Columbia Department of Human Services, a common law marriage is "[a] marriage that is legally recognized even though there has been no ceremony and there is no certification of marriage. A common law marriage exists if the two persons are legally free to marry, if it is the intent of the two persons to establish a marriage, and if the two are known to the community as husband and wife."

Common law marriages have been recognized in the District of Columbia since 1931. Holding common law marriages legal, District Court of Appeals Justice D. Laurence Groner said,

"an agreement between a man and woman to be husband and wife, consummated by cohabitation as husband and wife, constitutes a valid marriage unless there be in existence in the State in which the agreement is made, a statute declaring the marriage to be invalid unless solemnized in a prescribed manner. We think it equally true that the rule now generally recognized is that statutes requiring a marriage to be preceded by a license or to be solemnized by a religious ceremony ... are directory merely and failure to procure the license or to go through a religious ceremony does not invalidate the marriage."

=== Iowa ===
Adm. Rule 701—73.25 (425) of the Iowa Administrative Code, titled Common Law Marriage, states the required elements to establish a common-law marriage:

(a) a present intent of both parties to become married,
(b) a public declaration by the parties or a holding out to the public that they are husband and wife, and
(c) continuous cohabitation together as husband and wife (consummation of the marriage).

No special time limit is necessary to establish a common law marriage.

Edit: 701—73.26 Rescinded, effective October 2, 1985.

This rule is intended to implement Iowa Code section 425.17. The public declaration or holding out to the public is considered to be the acid test of a common law marriage.

=== Kansas ===
Under Kansas Statute 23-2502, the requirements to establish a common law marriage in Kansas are: (1) capacity to marry; (2) a present marriage agreement; and (3) a holding out of each other as husband and wife to the public.

=== Montana ===
A common law marriage is established when a couple: "(1) is competent to enter into a marriage, (2) mutually consents and agrees to a common law marriage, and (3) cohabits and is reputed in the community to be husband and wife."

=== Rhode Island ===
The criteria for a common law marriage are: (1) the parties seriously intended to enter into the husband-wife relationship; (2) the parties’ conduct is of such a character as to lead to a belief in the community that they were married.

=== Texas ===
The Texas Family Code, Sections 2.401 through 2.405, define how a common law marriage (which is known as both "marriage without formalities" and "informal marriage" in the text) can be established in one of two ways. Both parties must be at least age 18 to enter into a common law marriage.

First, a couple can file a legal "Declaration of Informal Marriage", which is a legally binding document. The form must be completed by both marriage partners and sworn or affirmed in presence of the County Clerk. The Declaration is formally recorded as part of the Official County Records by Volume and Page number, and is then forwarded by the County Clerk to the Texas Bureau of Vital Statistics, where it is again legally recorded as formal evidence of marriage. This is the same procedure that is used when a marriage license is issued and filed; the term "Informal" refers only to the fact that no formal wedding ceremony (whether civil or religious) was conducted.

Second, a couple can meet a three-prong test, showing evidence of all of the following:

1. an agreement to be married;
2. after such agreement, lived together in Texas as husband and wife; and
3. represented to others in Texas that they are married.

Regarding the second prong, the text of the Texas Family Code does not specify the length of time that a couple must cohabitate to meet this requirement. As such, an informal marriage can occur under Texas law if the couple lives together for as little as one day, if the other requirements (an agreement to be married and holding out as married to the public) can be shown.

Dissolution of this type marriage requires formal Annulment or Divorce Proceedings, the same as with the other more recognized forms of 'ceremonial' marriages. However, if a couple does not commence a proceeding to prove their relationship was a marriage within two years of the end of their cohabitation and relationship, there is a legal presumption that they never agreed to be married, but this presumption is rebuttable.

=== New Hampshire ===
New Hampshire recognizes common law marriage for purposes of probate only, and posthumously recognizes common-law marriages to ensure that the surviving spouse can inherit. In New Hampshire "[P]ersons cohabiting and acknowledging each other as husband and wife, and generally reputed to be such, for the period of 3 years, and until the decease of one of them, shall thereafter be deemed to have been legally married."

== States with unclear status regarding common-law marriage ==
=== Oklahoma ===
The situation in Oklahoma has been unclear since the mid-1990s, with legal scholars reporting 1994, 1998, 2005, and 2010 each as the year common law marriage was abolished in the state. However, as of August 2022, the Oklahoma Tax Commission continues to represent common law marriage as legal, and the Department of Corrections continues to reference common law marriage, though that could refer to older marriages. No reference to the ban appears in the relevant statutes; the 2010 bill that attempted to abolish common law marriage passed the state Senate, but died in a House committee. and a reputed ban in 2010 cannot be found in its statutes.

=== Utah ===
The status of common law marriage in Utah is not clear. Government websites claim that common law marriage does not exist in Utah but other legal websites state that "non-matrimonial relationships" may be recognized as marriage within one year after the relationship ends. Whether this amounts to recognition of non-marital relationship contracts, or post-factum recognition of common law marriage is a subject for debate.

In any case, Utah will only recognise the relationship if it has been validated by a court or administrative order: "[A] court or administrative order must establish that" the parties: (1) "are legally capable of entering a solemnized marriage under the provisions of Title 30, Chap. 1 of the Utah Code; (2) "have cohabited"; (3) "mutually assume marital rights, duties, and obligations"; and (4) "hold themselves out as and have acquired a uniform and general reputation as husband and wife".

== Representative legislation in some states that no longer permit domestic common law marriage ==
Even though the following states do not recognize common-law marriage entered into in that state, they will recognize a marriage from another state that is valid unless it is against public policy.

=== Alabama ===
Alabama abolished common law marriage effective January 1, 2017. Common law marriages contracted before this date are still valid. Such a valid common law marriage exists when there is present agreement or consent to be married, public recognition of the existence of the marriage, and consummation.

=== Florida ===
Florida abolished common law marriage effective January 1, 1968; marriages contracted prior to this date are not affected.

=== Pennsylvania ===
Pennsylvania's domestic relations marriage statute now reads: "No common law marriage contracted after January 1, 2005, shall be valid. Nothing in this part shall be deemed or taken to render any common law marriage otherwise lawful and contracted on or before January 1, 2005, invalid." The situation became unclear in 2003 when an intermediate appellate court purported to abolish common law marriage in PNC Bank Corporation v. Workers' Compensation Appeal Board (Stamos) even though the state Supreme Court had recognized (albeit somewhat reluctantly) the validity of common law marriages only five years before in Staudenmayer v. Staudenmayer. The Pennsylvania legislature resolved most of the uncertainty by abolishing common law marriages entered into after January 1, 2005. However, it is still uncertain whether Pennsylvania courts will recognize common law marriages entered into after the date of the Stamos decision (17 September 2003) and before the effective date of the statute (1 January 2005), because Pennsylvania's other intermediate appellate court has indicated that it might not follow the Stamos decision.

== See also ==
- Domestic partnership in the United States
- Civil unions in the United States
- Putative marriage
