= Impediment (Catholic canon law) =

Legal obstacle within Catholic Church canon law

In the canon law of the Catholic Church, an impediment is a legal obstacle that prevents a sacrament from being performed either validly or licitly or both. The term is used most frequently in relationship to the sacraments of Marriage and Holy Orders. Some canonical impediments can be dispensed by the competent authority (usually the local ordinary but some impediments are reserved to the Apostolic See) as defined in Catholic canon law.

== Impediments to marriage ==
Roman Catholic sacramental theology teaches that the ministers of the sacrament of holy matrimony are the man and woman, and therefore any marriage contracted voluntarily between two baptized and unmarried adults is valid, though under ordinary circumstances the marriage must be witnessed by clergy to be licit. However, various provisions in current canon law outline extraordinary circumstances that would form impediments to marital validity.

=== Validity vs. liceity ===
The validity of an action is distinguished from its being licit in that the former pertains to its integrity while the latter its legality. (An analogous illustration might be that of a disbarred lawyer who wins a court case; the verdict is not overturned, but the attorney is still subject to sanctions. Similarly, a priest who has been laicized, suspended, or excommunicated cannot licitly celebrate Mass, but should he nonetheless do so the Mass is still considered valid.)

Impediments to marriage are classified according to many different criteria.

=== Diriment vs. impedient ===
In regard to their effect on the sacrament, impediments are either diriment, which invalidate an attempted marriage, or prohibitive (or impedient), which make a marriage illicit but valid. "Diriment" comes from the Latin word dirimens ("separating"), that is, an impediment that means the couple cannot be joined. The 1983 Code of Canon Law does not list prohibitive impediments as such, and thus the distinction between validity and licitness is less clear than in previous formularies.

=== Of divine law vs. of ecclesiastical law ===
In regard to their origin, impediments are either from divine law, and so cannot be dispensed, or from ecclesiastical law, and so can be dispensed by the competent Church authority. Under the 1983 Code of Canon Law, ecclesiastical impediments only apply to marriages where one or both of the parties is Catholic. Under the prior 1917 Code, ecclesiastical impediments applied to the marriages of non-Catholic Christians as well, unless specifically exempted. Note that, as clarified by articles 2 and 4 of Dignitas Connubii, the Catholic Church now recognizes the diriment impediments of other (i.e., non-Catholic) Churches and ecclesial communities when their members are parties to a marriage.

=== Other distinctions ===
Impediments are also classified as follows:

- public, which can be proved in the external forum, or occult, which cannot be so proved;
- absolute, which apply to one party regardless of the other party, or relative, which apply only in relation to certain other parties;
- permanent or temporary, according to the duration of the impediment; and

whether they can be dispensed by the local ordinary under ordinary circumstances, or whether their dispensation is reserved to the Pope

=== List of diriment impediments to marriage ===
- Age. If the man is under 16 years of age, or the woman is under 14 years of age, then their marriage is invalid. This is an ecclesiastical impediment, and so does not apply to a marriage between two non-Catholics. However, in a marriage between a Catholic and a non-Catholic, the age limitation applies to the non-Catholic party as well. Each national episcopal conference has the authority to set a higher minimum age as a prohibitive impediment. In general, individual bishops do not have this authority (cf. CIC c. 1075 §2). In Canada, and also in New Zealand, this minimum age has been set to 18 years old for both parties. In England and Wales, this minimum age has been set to be in accordance with civil law (i.e., 16 years old for both parties). In Gambia, Liberia, and Sierre Leone, this minimum age has been set to 18 years old for the man and 16 years old for the woman. In the Philippines, this minimum has been set to 21 years old for the bridegroom, and 18 years old for the bride. In South Africa, and also in Switzerland, this minimum age has been set to be in accordance with civil law. In Nigeria, the episcopal conference has delegated the authority to set a higher prohibitive minimum age to the individual bishops. The United States Conference of Catholic Bishops has not enacted a higher prohibitive minimum age for marriage.
- Impotence (physical capacity for consummation lacking). Per Canon 1084 §3 "Without prejudice to the provisions of Canon 1098, sterility- the absolute or probable inability to have children due to defects or abnormalities in the reproductive organs or other associated organs, or of the germ cells (the ova and sperm), neither forbids nor invalidates a marriage." Both parties, however, must be physically capable of completed vaginal intercourse, wherein the man ejaculates "true semen", even if the amount is small and/or if there are no viable sperm, into the woman's vagina (even if the cervix or uterus are absent, the ova are absent or non-viable, or the vagina is deformed). (See for details.) To invalidate a marriage, the impotence must be perpetual (i.e., incurable) and antecedent to the marriage. The impotence can either be absolute or relative. This impediment is generally considered to derive from divine natural law, and so cannot be dispensed. The reason behind this impediment is explained in the Summa Theologica: "In marriage there is a contract whereby one is bound to pay the other the marital debt: wherefore just as in other contracts, the bond is unfitting if a person bind himself to what he cannot give or do, so the marriage contract is unfitting, if it be made by one who cannot pay the marital debt." See also: Impotence and marriage.
- Prior bond. Previous marriages, whether conducted in the Catholic Church, in another church, or by the State. All previous attempts at marriage by both parties wishing to marry must be declared null prior to a wedding in the Catholic Church, without regard to the religion of the party previously married. Divine, absolute, temporary. The impediment of prior bond only arises from a valid marriage. An invalid marriage does not give rise to the impediment.
- Disparity of cult. A marriage between a Catholic and a non-baptized person is invalid, unless this impediment is dispensed by the local ordinary. Ecclesiastical, relative.
- Sacred orders. One of the parties has received sacred orders. Ecclesiastical, absolute, permanent (unless dispensed by the Apostolic See).
- Public perpetual vow of chastity. One of the parties has made a public perpetual (not just temporary vows or the novitiate or postulancy) vow of chastity. Ecclesiastical, absolute, permanent (unless dispensed by the Apostolic See).
- Abduction. One of the parties has been abducted with the view of contracting marriage. Ecclesiastical, temporary.
- Crimen. One or both of the parties has brought about the death of a spouse with the view of entering marriage with each other. Ecclesiastical, relative, permanent (unless dispensed by the Apostolic See). Under the Decretals of Pope Gregory IX, the requirements were that either the adulterous pair should promise marriage after the death of the spouse, or that they should attempt marriage while the spouse was still living. While both partners had to be aware that they are committing adultery, affected ignorance, ignorance from refusal to investigate what they are doing, does not remove it. If the pair who wish to marry co-operated to kill the spouse of one of them, in order that they might be free to marry, the impediment is invoked, even if they had not committed adultery. Likewise, if one of an adulterous pair killed a spouse (of either partner) in order to marry, the impediment is invoked. Only the pope may dispense this impediment; there are no instances in which any pope has done so.
- Consanguinity. The parties are closely related by blood. Ecclesiastical or divine, depending on the degree of relationship. Relative, permanent.
- Affinity. The parties are related by marriage in a prohibited degree. Ecclesiastical, relative, permanent.
- Public propriety. The parties are "related" by notorious concubinage. (Example: A man and a woman live together without marrying; this impediment prevents the man marrying the woman's mother or daughter–but not the woman herself–even if the cohabiting relationship has ended or the woman has died.) Ecclesiastical, relative, permanent.
- Adoption. The parties are related by adoption. Ecclesiastical, relative, permanent.
- Spiritual relationship. One of the parties is the godparent of the other. This no longer applies in the Latin Church, but still applies in the Eastern Catholic Churches.

=== Other factors which invalidate marriage ===
- Lack of form. When a marriage of a Catholic takes place without following the laws and rites of the Catholic Church. Such a marriage does not even have the appearance of validity and, consequently, does not enjoy the presumption of validity.
- Coercion. This impediment exists if one of the parties is pressured by any circumstances to enter into marriage. (In order for the impediment to cease, the situation must change so that the party can marry freely of his or her own will.)
- Psychological immaturity or mental incapacity. To enter into sacramental marriage, both parties must understand and have the capacity to accept the minimum of what it entails.
- Refusal to have children. One of the goods of marriage is children. A man or woman physically capable of fathering or, respectively, conceiving a child but who intends never to have children may not marry in the Catholic Church.
- Exclusion of fidelity. Fidelity of each party to the other is a good of marriage. If this is specifically excluded in the mind of either party, the couple may not marry in the Catholic Church.

== Impediments to ordination to the priesthood ==
Impediments to the priesthood are divided into "irregularities", which are permanent unless removed by the competent authority, and "simple impediments", which may pass with time without action of an ecclesiastical authority. Canon Law also lists various impediments to the exercise of a priesthood that has already been conferred. The bishop can remove most irregularities and simple impediments, except for those involving public apostasy, heresy, or schism; abortion or murder, even if in secret; and existing marriages. Irregularities that cannot be removed by the bishop can be removed by the Holy See (i.e. the Pope or the appropriate dicastery of the Roman Curia).

=== Irregularities ===
An irregularity is a canonical impediment directly impeding the reception of tonsure and holy orders or preventing the exercise of orders already received.

- Mental illness that prevents fulfillment of the duties of the priesthood.
- Apostasy, heresy or schism. Previous rejection of the faith which was public and notorious is an impediment, until and unless it is recanted and has been absolved.
- Attempted marriage. The attempt to marry despite an existing valid marriage or vow of chastity, or the marriage to a woman who had an existing valid marriage or vow of chastity forms an irregularity even after the death of the spouse.
- Participation in an abortion or murder. Any prior act, statement, financial or moral support which contributed positively to a specific case of successful abortion or murder is an impediment. This could include driving a woman to the abortion clinic or paying for her abortion. Paying taxes to a state that funds abortions would generally not be considered a "positive" contribution to the abortion.
- Attempted suicide, self-mutilation, or mutilation of others. Any premeditated attempt at suicide disqualifies one as a candidate for ordination. The act of mutilation must be performed graviter et dolose in order for it to be an impediment (cutting off a hand or foot, castration, etc.).
- Attempt to perform an act proper to the priesthood or episcopate. This applies to acts such as hearing confessions, etc. when one has not received the proper ordination to do so.

==== Irregularities to the exercise of orders ====
- Reception of ordination with an irregularity. If the irregularity is not brought to the bishop's attention before ordination, a cleric might be ordained who has an irregularity. Such a cleric cannot exercise his ministry until the irregularity is removed.
- Apostasy, heresy or schism that occurs after ordination, if this act is publicly known.
- Commission of acts that would have led to an irregularity.

=== Simple impediments ===
==== Simple impediments to ordination ====
- Previous marriage. This applies to Latin Church priests and bishops and Eastern Catholic bishops only. All previous marriages must be declared null, or the spouse must have died. In the case of a deceased spouse, most bishops require that the children be raised to adulthood before the man can undertake a vocation to the priesthood.
- Political office or other positions that a priest is not permitted to occupy. This impediment disappears as soon as the candidate is no longer in office.
- Recent baptism. The bishop must determine when a newly baptized person is sufficiently mature in his faith to undertake an ordained ministry in the Church.

==== Simple impediments to the exercise of the priesthood ====
- Reception of ordination with a simple impediment.
- Physical or mental illness that prevents fulfillment of the duties of the priesthood, until the bishop determines that the priest may resume the exercise of his ministry.

== See also ==
- Declaration of nullity
- Validation of marriage
