= Vinculum =

Vinculum may refer to:

- Vinculum (insect anatomy), a male genital structure in moths and butterflies
- Vinculum (ligament), a band of connective tissue, similar to a ligament, that connects a flexor tendon to a phalanx bone
- Vinculum (symbol), a horizontal line used in mathematical notation for a specific purpose
- Vinculum, a piece of Borg technology featured in the Star Trek:Voyager episode "Infinite Regress"
- Vinculum juris, a Latin phrase meaning "the chain of the law", which denotes that something is legally binding
- Ligamen, a concept in Catholic canon law
