= Matrimonial nullity trial reforms of Pope Francis =

Reforms of the Canon law of the Catholic Church

The matrimonial nullity trial reforms of Pope Francis are the reforms of the Canon law of the Catholic Church governing such trials, made public on 8 September 2015. The reforms were effected by two separate apostolic letters from Pope Francis: the motu proprio Mitis Iudex Dominus Iesus amending the 1983 Code of Canon Law, and the motu proprio Mitis et misericors Iesus amending the Code of Canons of the Eastern Churches. This was in response to the bishops who, during the 2014 Synod on the Family, called for the simplification of the procedure whereby a canonically invalid marriage is declared null.

At the press conference announcing the reforms, Cardinal Francesco Coccopalmerio, the president of the Pontifical Council for Legislative Texts, emphasized that the church does not decree the "annulment" of a legally valid marriage, but rather declares the "nullity" of a legally invalid marriage.

== Scope of the reforms ==
There are three main reforms:

1. A cleric's "second review" before nullity can be declared was eliminated.
2. Bishops now have the authority to declare nullity themselves, and in a more efficient manner.
3. The process should be gratis (for free), as long as the tribunal workers can still be paid a just wage.

The reforms took legal effect on 8 December 2015.

The expedited process may take as few as 120 days.

== History of the reforms ==
The reforms were proposed by a group of experts in matrimonial jurisprudence. According to experts at the Vatican, they are the most expansive revision in matrimonial nullity jurisprudence in centuries. The reforms are a departure from the 18th-century matrimonial nullity reforms of the canonist Pope Benedict XIV.

== Reception ==
Austen Ivereigh described the reforms as "revolutionary" and says that they are the broadest reforms in 300 years.

Kurt Martens, a canon law professor, worries that the reduction in procedure will not guarantee a fair trial. He likened the reforms to the Catholic Church providing a means of no-fault divorce. In an article published by conservative religious journal First Things, Martens stated that many Italian jurists fear that there might be a spike in conflicts between the canonical, Italian, and European Union judicial systems, since the reforms abolish a number of "basic due process norms" which are neither respected nor acknowledged. In his view, this renders the canonical judicial system "incompatible with modern procedural norms".

Pope Francis reflected after the 2014 Synod on the Family that: "A great number of synod fathers emphasized the need to make the procedure in cases of nullity more accessible and less time-consuming, and, if possible, at no expense." Between 1970 and 1983 the United States bishops had experimented with the possibility of one rather than two hearings and 90 % of the cases were decided without the second tribunal. But the Code of Canon Law of 1983 eliminated this possibility, now restored through Pope Francis' revisions. Others saw that "Putting the poor at the centre is what distinguishes the reform of Pope Francis." In the words of the motu proprio: "Care is to be taken that everyone, parties or witnesses, can participate in the process at a minimum of cost."
