= Second Extraordinary General Assembly of the Synod of Bishops =

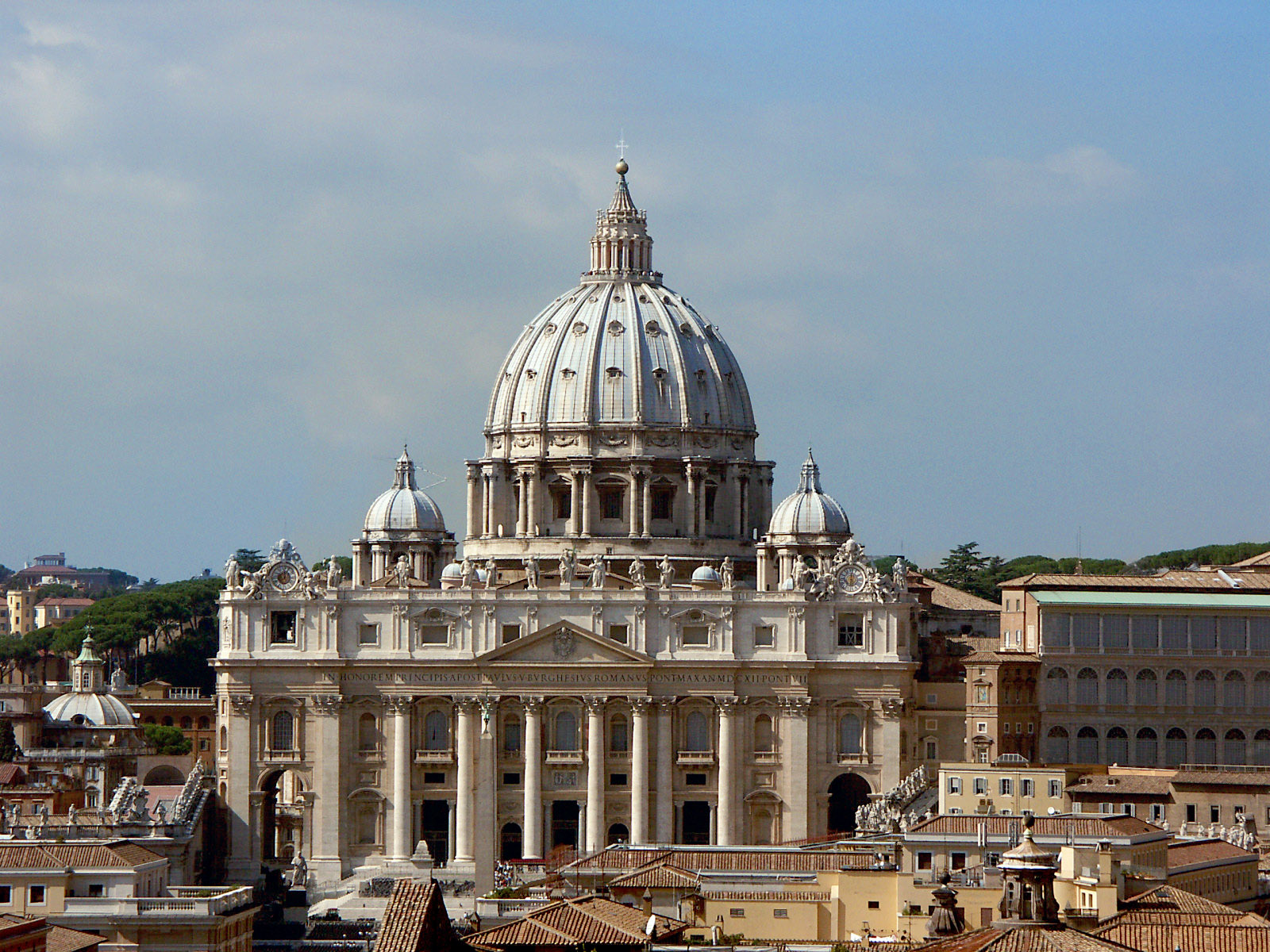
- St. Peter's Basilica
- Date: 24 November–8 December 1985
- Convoked by: Pope John Paul II
- President: Pope John Paul II
- Attendance: 165
- Topics: The Twentieth Anniversary of the Conclusion of the Second Vatican Council
- Documents and statements: Final Report of the Second Extraordinary General Assembly of the Synod of Bishops

The Second Extraordinary General Assembly of the Synod of Bishops, was held in Vatican City from 24 November to 8 December 1985 on the topic of The Twentieth Anniversary of the Conclusion of the Second Vatican Council. The synod was a gathering of 165 bishops and other participants to celebrate, verify, and promote the council, also known as Vatican II. The participants evaluated the implementation of the changes heralded by Vatican II in the past, and discussed how best to apply them in the future. The bishops discussed topics including secularism, evangelization, the universal call to holiness, formation of seminarians, catechism, liturgy, communion, the role of the laity, ecumenism, the preferential option for the poor, and Catholic social teaching.

In the months leading up to it, it was widely expected that the synod would be a showdown between the conservative Cardinal Joseph Ratzinger and more liberal prelates, like the American representative, Bishop James Malone. This led to some calling the event "Ratzinger's Synod." There was also speculation that the representatives of bishops' conferences would seek to gain more autonomy from the Vatican. In the synod's final report, Pope John Paul II included three of the suggestions of the bishops that he welcomed the most: the creation of a catechism of Catholic faith and morals, a study of the theological nature of bishops' conferences, and the publication of a new code of canon law for the Eastern Catholic Churches. The Code of Canons of the Eastern Churches was published in 1990. A notable result of the synod was the 1992 publication of the Catechism of the Catholic Church.

== Background ==
The synod was announced on the evening of 25 January 1985, the Feast of the Conversion of St. Paul, by Pope John Paul II at the Basilica of St. Paul Outside the Walls. In making the announcement, the pope said:

"This year is the twentieth anniversary of the conclusion of the Second Vatican Council, whose first announcement, we well recall, was made by my predecessor John XXIII, of venerated memory, in this very basilica and on this same day, the 25th of January 1959."

The Pope said his goal was to "'to relive in some way that extraordinary atmosphere of ecclesiastical communion.''

In mid-March, Archbishop Jan Pieter Schotte, the Secretary General of the Synod of Bishops, sent a questionnaire to those attending the synod, including the presidents of episcopal conferences, and papal invitees. Cardinal Godfried Danneels was the relator of synod, and he read through the replies and created a summary.

== Chronology ==
=== Opening ===
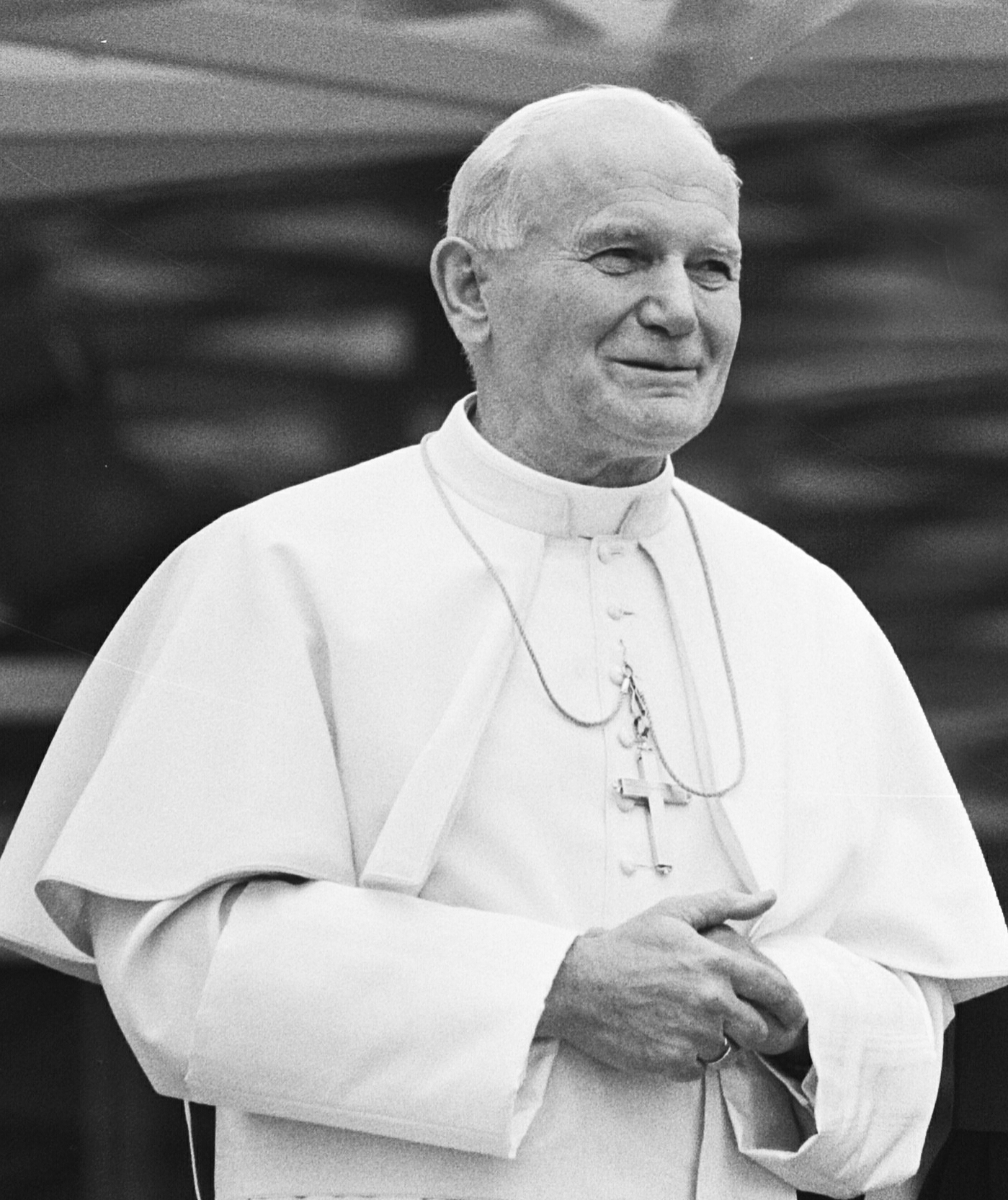
Pope John Paul II

The synod opened with Mass in St. Peter's Basilica on the morning of 24 November 1985, the Feast of Christ the King. The pope and 165 bishops, all wearing choir dress, processed through the basilica on the same path as during the opening ceremony of the first session of the Second Vatican Council. The bishops took their seats on elevated platforms facing the pope, amidst choirs singing liturgical music. In his homily, Pope John Paul II encouraged the bishops to revive the Spirit of Vatican II, saying:

"We start the synod process in this eucharistic celebration with the same willingness to listen to the Holy Spirit, with the same love for the Church, with the same gratitude to Divine Providence that were present in the council Fathers twenty years ago. During the next two weeks all the members of the synod, among whom there are many people who lived in the exceptional grace of the council, they will walk together with the council to revive the spiritual atmosphere of this great ecclesiastical event and to promote, in the light of key documents then issued and the experience gained over the next two decades, the full flowering of new life aroused by the Holy Spirit and ecumenical attention at this, for the greater glory of God and for the coming of his Kingdom."

Later in the homily, he expressed his desire for greater unity both within the Catholic Church and amongst all Christians, specifically acknowledging the presence of the observer-delegates from other denominations. After Mass, Pope John Paul II gave his inaugural address to open the synod. In the address, the pope presented a spiritual theme, but did not deliver specific instructions, appearing to give the bishops flexibility in choosing the synod's direction. He encouraged them to forge new "vistas" for the Church's mission. The pope said:

''In this time of ours, when from various sides the primacy of man is set up in opposition to the primacy of God, the Council in a convincing manner makes aware that the 'kingdom of man' can find its proper dimension only in the Kingdom of God."

Many bishops praised the pope's opening address, appreciating his commitment to the ideals of Vatican II and his hope for its continued realization. The American Cardinal Joseph Bernardin, described the speech as optimistic and encouraging, saying, "My hope is that the synod will motivate us all to continue this kind of reflection and evaluation." In addition to the pope's speech, Cardinal John Krol, one of three delegate-presidents, also gave an opening speech, described by one Catholic magazine as "magnificent." Cardinal Gabriel-Marie Garrone, the President of the Pontifical Council for Culture, gave a reflective address discussed the Second Vatican Council. Following the opening ceremony, Pope John Paul II addressed the hundreds of young people who had gathered in St. Peter's Square, many of them congregated around a large wooden cross that the pope had gifted to the "youth of the world."

=== Sessions ===
The sessions of the synod, which lasted from November 24 to December 8, included eight minute-long addresses by the bishops during the first four days, followed by a series of small group sessions, and a general discussion during the final days.

On 5 December, an Ecumenical Prayer Service was held, with Pope John Paul II presiding over it and the fraternal delegates, who represented non-Catholic groups, present. In a short homily, the pope mentioned the appropriateness of praying for unity with "our friends" the fraternal delegates. He spoke about the necessity for a personal relationship with Jesus Christ in reaching Christian unity.

=== Babi Burke incident ===
On 4 December, Babi Burke, a 44-year-old American nurse and mother of four from Fort Lauderdale, Florida, staged a mock Mass in St. Peter's Basilica to protest the Catholic Church's exclusion of women from the priesthood. Burke, wearing a draping black embroidered robe and a white woolen shawl, entered the basilica in the early afternoon with a small group of journalists and photographers. Carrying a lit alcohol lamp, she approached an altar under Bernini's baldachin, behind the main altar. At the altar, she removed her shawl and put on a priest's stole. She kissed the altar and blessed herself with the sign of the cross, and raised her arms in the gesture of fellowship. Burke proceeded to bless and consume a communion host and raise a silver chalice of wine, drinking from it. The host had been brought with her from the U.S. As she mimicked the most sacred part of the Mass, two Vatican security guards ran towards her and removed her from the basilica, holding her arms. As she was led away, Burke exclaimed, "I am Catholic. I am a woman. I belong here." The whole incident lasted around five minutes. After being removed from the basilica, Burke was taken to the Vatican security headquarters.

Following the incident, the chief Vatican spokesman, Joaquín Navarro-Valls, said that Burke had been released after questioning and no charges would be filed. The Rev. Carlo Caffarra, a spokesman for the synod, condemned the incident, saying, "Morally, it is a sacrilege because it is a serious disrespect of what is most holy in the Church, the sacrament of the eucharist, and it was carried out in a sacred place." Burke held a press conference on Saturday, 7 December, with Marie-Terese Soumoy, a Belgian former nun and a supporter of her cause. Both women were accredited as a reporters covering the synod, and were both members of the Center of Research and Action on Women and Religion. At the conference, Burke delivered a prepared statement, saying,

"This act represents the reality that our dear leaders must not keep us in bondage to the traditional practices and utterances from generation to generation. Presently, there are 165 men deciding on the future of the Church, yet there are no women with a vote at this synod."

Burke's colleague Soumoy then proceeded to speak, addressing the aftermath of the incident. She noted that the Vatican security guards has asked for her and Burke's identity papers and also confiscated film from a photographer who had taken pictures of the mock Mass. She also said that the questioning by the Vatican guards had not been rigorous. Soumoy stated that Burke did not desire priestly ordination herself, but was a "woman full of love" acting on behalf of other women who wish to become priests. A written statement, which had been distributed to journalists after the event, stated,

"This act is a declaration that one of the fruits of Vatican II are the many prepared women called to ordained priesthood. They must be recognized and called into service for their church... Sexism is a sacrilege to the Gospel of Christ... [This act] is a short prayer of profession for the love of God and the church."

=== Closing ===
On 8 December, Pope John Paul II gave his closing address and ended the synod. Delegate-president Cardinal John Krol also gave a closing address, described by one Catholic magazine as "magnificent".

== Participants ==
There were over 165 participants in the synod, including cardinals, archbishops, and bishops (mostly heads of episcopal conferences, 25 heads of the dicasteries of the Roman Curia, nine members of the Ordinary Council for the Secretariat, the Secretary General of the Synod, the Undersecretary, over a dozen members invited by Pope John Paul II, and 10 fraternal delegates. No women were invited to participate as voting members, though several of the observers were women.

In addition to Pope John Paul II, who served as president of the synod, there were multiple other classes of participants. Archbishop Jan Pieter Schotte, CICM, served as Secretary General, Cardinal Godfried Danneels was the Relator General, and the Rev. Walter Kasper was the Special Secretary. The delegate presidents were cardinals John Krol, Joseph Malula, and Johannes Willebrands.

Though the number of bishops was much smaller than at the Second Vatican Council, the press corps was significantly larger. Archbishop John Patrick Foley, the president of the Pontifical Commission for Social Communications, reported that in addition to the 200 regular accredited members of the Vatican press corps, 600 accreditations were issued for the synod, half of which were from the United States. Press briefings were given daily in different languages, and the English briefings were given by the Irish priest Diarmuid Martin. Martin, then part of Archbishop Édouard Gagnon's staff at the Pontifical Council for the Family, is today a cardinal and the Archbishop of Dublin.

== See also ==
- Third Extraordinary General Assembly of the Synod of Bishops
- Joseph Ratzinger as Prefect of the Congregation for the Doctrine of the Faith
