= Law of gradualness =

Concept in Catholic moral theology

In Catholic moral theology, the law of gradualness, the law of graduality or gradualism, is the notion that people improve their relationship with God and grow in the virtues gradually, and do not jump to perfection in a single step. In terms of pastoral care, it suggests that "it is often better to encourage the positive elements in someone's life rather than to chastise their flaws". It is "as old as Christianity itself", being referred to in several New Testament passages.

It is distinct from "gradualness of the law", an idea that would tend to diminish the demands of the law. It does not mean "that we compromise on the content of the law" but that we recognize our failings and strive to correspond to its demands over time.

== Gradations of evil ==
The law of gradualness recognizes that the lives and relationships of people with morally unacceptable lifestyles may have some elements of good, even of great good, such as sacrificial love and consistent respect. It recognizes that virtues are not all-or-nothing propositions, and that elements of good may be found even in the context of morally unacceptable situations.

Gradualism recognizes elements of good in what on the whole is blameworthy, so as to encourage steps towards greater perfection, instead of simply chastising people for their mistakes. In this sense, gradualism is recognition that even in matters of grave evil there can be gradations of objective depravity, although the grave evil does not cease to be a grave evil.

== Growth towards goodness ==
In a Christian sense, conversion does not happen once and is over. It is "a fundamental change in one's direction — a new path or way of life in which one must learn to walk." In his apostolic exhortation Familiaris consortio of 1981, Pope John Paul II declared: "What is needed is a continuous, permanent conversion" that "is brought about concretely in steps which lead us ever forward. Thus a dynamic process develops, one which advances gradually." He added that man "day by day builds himself up through his many free decisions; and so he knows, loves and accomplishes moral good by stages of growth.”

In effect, he said that the Christian life can always be attained through God's grace, and our striving for it becomes easier according as we put it into practice. What Pope John Paul called the law of gradualness in human behavior is the step-by-step perfecting of the person in that person's practice of the Christian life.

Writing on L'Osservatore Romano about the 1986 letter of the Congregation for the Doctrine of the Faith on the pastoral care of homosexual persons, Bartholomew Kiely stated: "The 'law of gradualness' implies that when there exists a genuine (unfeigned) weakness in following a moral norm, the person is obliged to 'endeavour to place [or establish] the conditions for its observance' (Familiaris consortio, 34, par. 4). In other words, a person must be protected from discouragement even if the journey towards a life of Christian chastity involves special difficulties and is accompanied by repeated failures."

== Gradualness of the law ==
Much more controversial has been the use that some theologians have made of the concept as grounds for a permissive attitude to moral norms, treating them merely as ideals. Some have invoked this understanding on matters such as the Catholic Church's ban on artificial contraception, or cohabitating couples. This "lower[ing] the bar" of Church teachings that are deemed to be too difficult has been denigrated as moral relativism. Some believed this interpretation seemed to be mentioned in an interim discussion document presented at the Third Extraordinary General Assembly of the Synod of Bishops in October 2014, but it was excluded from the Synod's final report.

Pope John Paul II cautioned that "what is known as 'the law of gradualness' cannot be identified with 'gradualness of the law'". And in guidelines for confessors in 1997, the Pontifical Council for the Family stated that they should not be led by the law of gradualness to give people the impression that repentance does not require a decisive break with sin.

While the Catholic Church opposes the use of artificial contraceptives, Pope Benedict XVI said that, when a prostitute uses a condom to help stop the spread of AIDS, it could be "a first step in a movement toward a different way, a more human way, of living sexuality." This could be, the pope said, "a first assumption of responsibility, on the way toward recovering an awareness that not everything is allowed and that one cannot do whatever one wants." The concern for others thus suggested is laudable, but it does not mean that either prostitution or condoms are in themselves good.

In the concept of "the law of gradualness", Bartholomew Kiely wrote, those who are genuinely unable to observe the norm are nonetheless obliged to try, as Pope Paul said, "to place the conditions for its observance". They are always free to attempt, even if they lack the freedom to succeed. On the contrary, in the concept of "gradualness of the law", they would be under no obligation even to make an attempt.

What Pope John Paul said is that the moral teachings are always binding (no "gradualness of the law"), and practice makes them easier to observe ("the law of gradualness").

== See also ==
- Don't throw the baby out with the bathwater
