= Third Extraordinary General Assembly of the Synod of Bishops =

Catholic Church Synod

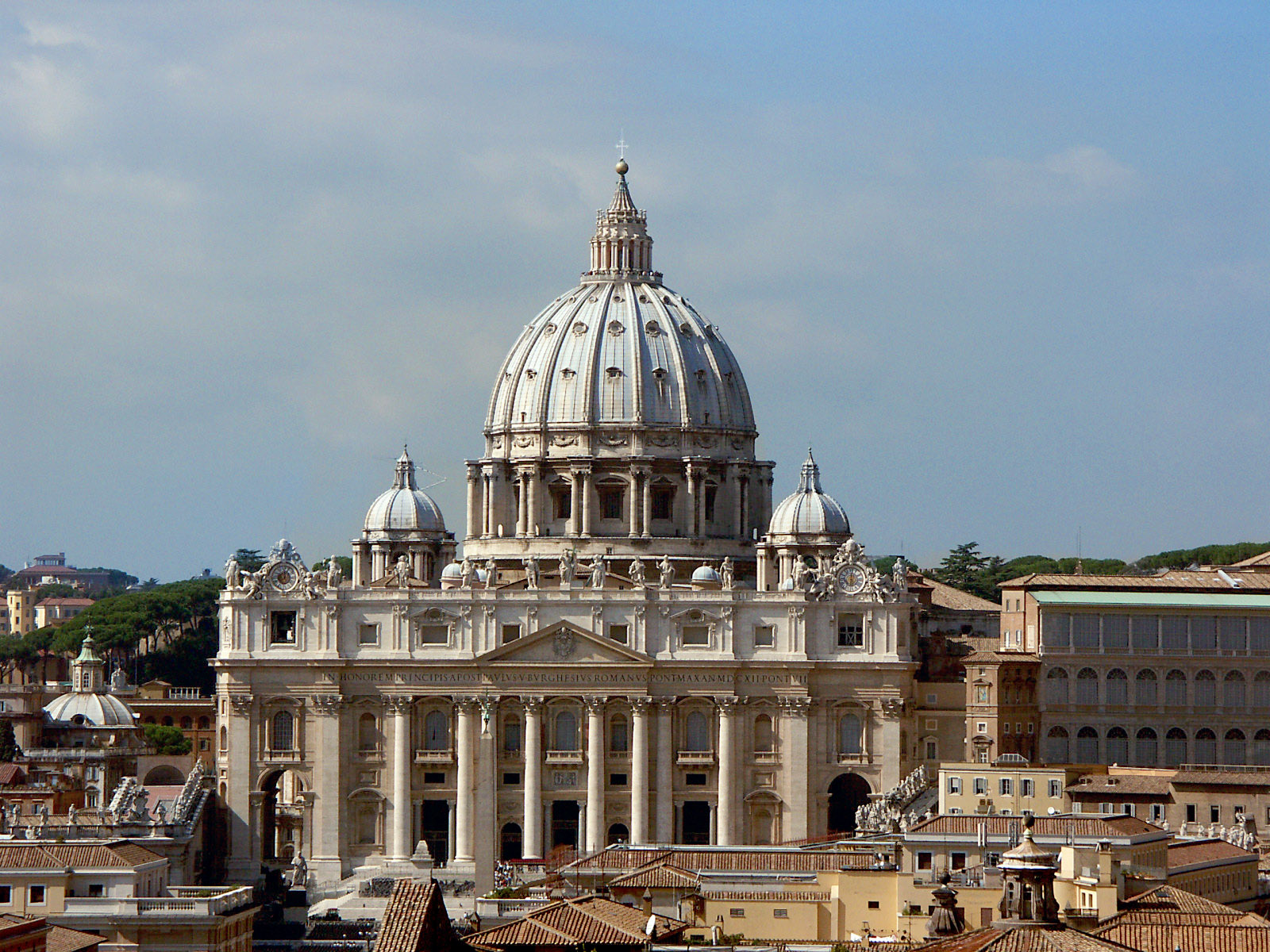
- Date: 5–19 October 2014
- Convoked by: Pope Francis
- President: Pope Francis
- Attendance: 253
- Topics: Pastoral Challenges of the Family in the Context of Evangelization
- Documents and statements: Message of the III Extraordinary General Assembly of the Synod of Bishops

The Third Extraordinary General Assembly of the Synod of Bishops, the first of two synods popularly referred to as the Synod on the Family, was held in Vatican City on 5–19 October 2014 on the topic of Pastoral Challenges of the Family in the Context of Evangelization. The synod was a gathering of 253 bishops and other participants in preparation for a larger synod with the same theme in October 2015. The participants discussed problems facing the family today, including the effects of war, immigration, domestic violence, sexual orientation, polygamy, inter-religious marriages, cohabitation, the breakdown of marriage, and divorce and remarriage. In particular, the synod was marked by debate regarding the pastoral care of Catholics living in "irregular unions", including those civilly remarried after divorce (in particular their desire to receive the Eucharist), unmarried cohabitating couples, and especially gay Catholics. The synod was also noted for the prominence of African bishops.

== Background ==
The synod was called on 8 October 2013 by Pope Francis who said he wished to "continue the reflection and journey of the whole Church, with the participation of leaders of the Episcopate from every corner of the world." The synod was meant to be the first of "two stages, forming a single organic unity" with the Fourteenth Ordinary General Assembly of the Synod of Bishops.

Later that month, Archbishop Lorenzo Baldisseri, Secretary General of the Synod of Bishops, sent a questionnaire to episcopal conferences around the globe asking them to distribute it "immediately as widely as possible to deaneries and parishes so that input from local sources can be received." The document, which includes 39 questions on 9 topic areas touching on themes such as contraception, same-sex unions, cohabitation by unwed couples, and marriage and divorce, marked "the first time the church's central hierarchy has asked for such input from grass-roots Catholics."

Responses were received from the synods of the Eastern Catholic Churches sui iuris, the episcopal conferences, the departments of the Roman Curia, and the Union of Superiors General. Over 90% of the episcopal conferences around the world sent responses. In addition, over 800 other organizations, including parishes, movements, groups, ecclesial associations, families, and both Catholic and non-Catholic academic institutions, also sent responses, which were categorized as observations. These responses formed the basis of a preparatory document known as the Instrumentum Laboris. The synod was "somewhat overwhelmed" by the tens of thousands of pages it received in response.

Archbishop Bruno Forte, selected by Pope Francis as the synod's special secretary, said before the synod that "the doctrine of the church is not up for discussion, but the synod members will be called upon to find ways to improve the 'pastoral application' of church teachings, ways to explain it and to help Catholics live it."

== Participants ==
There were 253 participants in the synod, including 114 presidents of bishops' conferences, 13 heads of Eastern Catholic Churches sui iuris, 25 heads of the dicasteries of the Roman Curia, nine members of the Ordinary Council for the Secretariat, the Secretary General of the synod, the Undersecretary, three male religious elected by the Union of Superiors General, 26 members appointed by Pope Francis, eight fraternal delegates, 38 auditors including 13 married couples, and 16 experts. There were 181 voting members.

In addition to Pope Francis, who served as president of the synod, there were 15 other classes of participants. Cardinal Lorenzo Baldisseri served as Secretary General, Cardinal Péter Erdő was the Relator General, and Forte was the Special Secretary. The delegate presidents were Cardinals André Vingt-Trois, Luis Antonio G. Tagle, and Raymundo Damasceno Assis. The Commission for the Message had Cardinal Gianfranco Ravasi as president and Archbishop Víctor Manuel Fernández as vice president.

Married couples from Africa, the Americas, Asia, Europe, and Oceania participated and were given an opportunity to speak, as did eight fraternal delegates from other Christian denominations, including Lutheran Bishop Ndanganeni Phaswana of South Africa, Anglican Bishop Paul Butler of Durham (Church of England), Russian Orthodox Metropolitan Hilarion of Russia, and representatives from Baptist and other churches.

== Debates ==
American journalist John L. Allen Jr. described the synod as "divided" with "a vigorous debate" between a "moderate-to-progressive camp" that was pushing for more welcoming language and "conservatives worried about blurring church teaching." According to Allen, the debate "was remarkably pointed and at times took on a nasty edge." Each bishop had four minutes to speak, but was allowed to submit longer documents in support of his position. At the outset, Pope Francis asked the synod fathers to speak openly, even if they had an opinion they were worried would conflict with the pontiff's.

Pope Francis said "the view of the media was often somewhat in the style of sports or political chronicles: often there was talk of two teams, for and against, conservatives and progressives." He added that "there was no clash between factions, as in a parliament where this is licit, but [instead] a discussion between bishops."

=== The law of gradualness ===
Many of the synod fathers spoke of the law of gradualness, a concept that at one level observes that there are gradations of virtues and vices, and that living situations need not be either completely good or completely evil. Pope John Paul II, in the apostolic exhortation written after the previous Synod on the Family in 1980, said: "What is known as 'the law of gradualness' or step-by-step advance cannot be identified with 'gradualness of the law', as if there were different degrees or forms of precept in God’s law for different individuals and situations."

=== Ron and Mavis Pirola ===
One of the lay couples to speak were the Australians Ron and Mavis Pirola, who addressed the synod on contemporary family life, saying that it was their desire to have sex with each other that brought them together and kept them together in spite of problems. They said that it was sexual intimacy that distinguished marriage from other Christ-centered relationships, and that "marriage is a sexual sacrament with its fullest expression in sexual intercourse."

Speaking to the press later, Cardinal Vincent Nichols said the Pirolas were "quite explicit", taking the bishops by surprise, and prompting other couples to follow their lead. He added, "That's not what we bishops talk about mostly, quite honestly." Nichols also said they helped the synod to recognize the often central importance of sex for the wellbeing of marriage.

The couple said that the Church, like families, "faces the tension of upholding the truth while expressing compassion and mercy." They gave homosexuality as an example, mentioning friends who "fully believed in the Church’s teachings" but accepted their gay son's request to bring his partner to the family's home on Christmas, simply because he was still their son. Other examples included a divorced woman and her children at their parish, and the elderly mother of a son with Down syndrome.

They added that while they looked to the Church for guidance, Church documents "seemed to be from another planet with difficult language and not terribly relevant to our own experiences."

=== Fraternal delegates ===
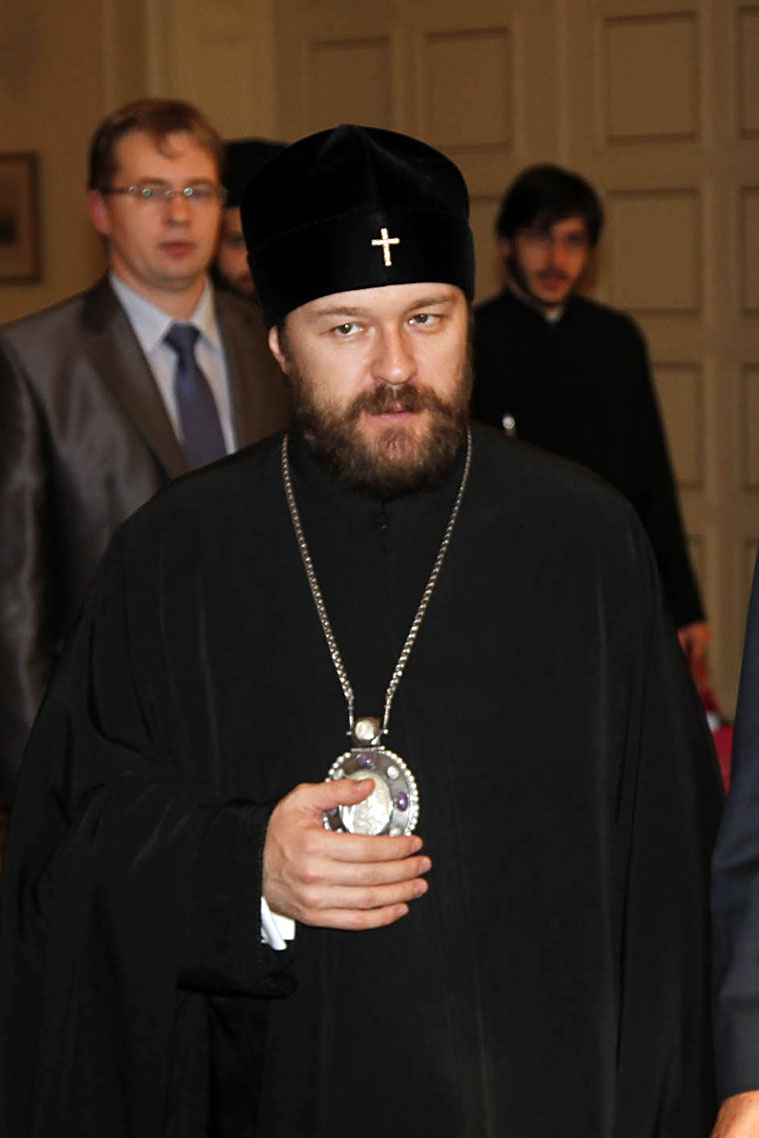
Metropolitan Hilarion

Eight fraternal delegates from other Christian denominations were also invited to participate and to address the synod. Hilarion, the chairman of the Russian Orthodox Church's Department of External Church Relations, made headlines when he took "a gratuitous swipe at Ukraine's Greek Catholic Church." Hilarion was upset about the smaller church's "complaining about Russian foreign policy and the support for Russian incursions in Ukraine voiced by Russian Orthodox leaders." After the speech, Cardinal Timothy Dolan pulled aside Archbishop Sviatoslav Shevchuk, head of the Ukrainian Greek Catholic Church, and taped a segment for his radio show that criticized the comments.

Anglican bishop Butler told the synod that, "like you", the Anglican Communion is "wrestling with how best to respond" to changing family dynamics around the world. While making clear that he considered marriage to be a lifelong commitment between a man and a woman, he added that "we have to minister to and with cohabiting, single-parent, and same-sex families."

== Interim discussion document ==
After the first week a relatio post disceptationem ("report after the debate") was delivered by the synod's relator, Cardinal Péter Erdő. This interim report was supposed to summarize the more than 265 speeches and written position papers given by the participants up until that point and to serve as a basis for detailed discussion in smaller language groups with a view to preparing a final text to be voted on afterwards. It was drafted by a committee of 16 officials, including six papal appointees, and reviewed by Pope Francis before it was released.

Many synod fathers were unhappy with the report. Several asked the synod to focus more on the positive examples of Christian families, to refer more often to the Gospel of the Family, and to change language and approach taken towards the issues of the divorced and remarried, and homosexuals.

The "lead author" of the interim report was not Erdő but Forte, described as "one of the more noted theological minds in the Italian hierarchy" and "known for pushing the pastoral envelope on dealing with people in 'irregular' unions while staying true to Catholic doctrine." He was criticized for trying "to drive the synod forward" by including "stunningly positive language" for those in such unions instead of simply summarizing the first week's discussions. It is thought that "conservative backlash" to this text resulted in the "reworked [and] considerably more cautious terms" in the final document.

Among other reasons, the document was controversial as a mention of the law of gradualness was perceived to be employed in a sense that had been rejected by Pope John Paul II in 1981 and by the Pontifical Council for the Family in 1997. The midterm report used the concept, according to Cardinal Donald Wuerl, "among other ways, to suggest the positive value of 'irregular' relationships such as cohabitation." Wuerl added that this was generally objected to in the small discussion groups, known as circuli minores, and disappeared entirely from the final report for lack of support.

=== Gay Catholics ===
The interim report asked if the Church was capable of guaranteeing gay Catholics "a place of fellowship in our communities" and "accepting and valuing their sexual orientation, without compromising Catholic doctrine on the family and matrimony." The interim report also aroused particular interest for the statement that gay people have "gifts and qualities to offer the Christian community."

It added that the Church ought to recognize the value of same-sex relationships: "Without denying the moral problems connected to homosexual unions it has to be noted that there are cases in which mutual aid to the point of sacrifice constitutes a precious support in the life of the partners." Wuerl argued that it was "not so much a change in the teaching of the Church, but a way of saying it that is far more inviting, far more welcoming."

After it was published and gained wide attention in the press, a heading in the English translation was changed from "welcoming homosexuals" to "providing for homosexual persons." The Italian original, and official, text remained the same: "Accogliere le persone omosessuali." Opponents of the more welcoming language "always prefaced anything they had to say about gays and lesbians by stipulating that they possess the same human dignity as everyone else, that their human rights must be defended, and that they must not be subjected to discrimination or abuse."

A Vatican spokesman could recall only one speech during the first week that dealt with pastoral care of gay Catholics. The importance given to it in the interim report led a journalist to remark that the written submissions that the drafters of the interim report had at their disposal may have included it. Cardinal Vincent Nichols argued that here was "no suggestion" that the Church was going to give approval to same-sex marriage or to change its teaching on sexual morality.

=== Divorced and remarried Catholics ===
The synod considered the issue of whether or not Catholics who had divorced and remarried could receive Holy Communion without first receiving a declaration of nullity. Of the 10 small groups of bishops within the synod, two clearly opposed the idea, one explicitly endorsed it, two others endorsed it with reservations, and the remaining groups did not mention it in their reports. The issue of allowing divorced and remarried Catholics to receive the Eucharist was discussed "with much passion," "kept the attention of numerous speakers during the Synod," and "required a lot of energy." In the end, paragraph 52 of the final report, which won a simple majority but less than two-thirds of the vote, said the issue "needs to be thoroughly examined."

In the months leading up to the synod, a speech given by Cardinal Walter Kasper was leaked to the press in which he suggested that "after a period of penance" Catholics who had divorced and remarried could be admitted to the sacraments of reconciliation and then Communion. Cardinal George Pell predicted that the synod would "not be giving in to the secular agenda," with reference to the question of Holy Communion for those in irregular marriage situations. Pell said that only very few of the synod fathers were in favor of it and that there were wider issues at stake, such as recognition of civil and homosexual unions.

Cardinal Raymond Burke said that church pastors can help people living in canonically irregular unions lead a chaste life by what is commonly termed "living as brother and sister," if staying together is important for the sake of children or other grave reasons. Burke explained that the complexity of nullity cases before tribunals is directly proportional to the complexity of the relationship they are commissioned to examine. He noted that Pope Francis has already named a commission to revise the tribunal process for nullity cases.

=== Reaction to the report ===
Of the bishops at the synod, 41 publicly expressed concern, noting the absence of the word "sin" and of the "gospel of the family" and the presence of various sentences open to misinterpretation. Gądecki, speaking in Polish on Vatican Radio, said that many of the synod fathers saw the text as "strongly ideologized, because it considered more the sociological than the theological side," but above all because "some of its theses seemed to devastate the magisterium of the Church."

The interim report's statements on homosexuality were described by gay rights advocates as "a seismic shift in tone toward acceptance of gays," according to the Associated Press. Rev. James Martin stated in America that the language used "represents a revolutionary change in how the church addresses the LGBT community," pointing to the document's lack of use of phrases such as "intrinsically disordered." The attitude change on homosexuality signaled by the interim report was welcomed by gay groups such as DignityUSA, who said that the "positive language" used "is more affirming and will give many people hope."

"Conservatives were outraged," according to the Associated Press, about "a remarkable tone of acceptance extended to gays" in the report. Cardinal Stanisław Gądecki called the interim report "unacceptable" and a deviation from church teaching, while Burke said the report was "manipulated." Cardinal Christoph Schönborn denounced discrimination against gays and lesbians, but added: "That doesn't mean the church should legitimize homosexual practices and, even less, recognize so-called homosexual 'marriage'."

Archbishop Zbigņevs Stankevičs echoed Gądecki, saying that to face the strong ideological attack waged today against the family, the synod must apply the Church's teaching afresh to the situation, but not by "losing our Catholic identity and without renouncing the truth about marriage." The midterm report left people with many questions, said Archbishop Joseph Edward Kurtz, who added "we didn't want to leave the synod with that lack of clarity." Accordingly, he said, the document had to be reshaped into a report "grounded in sacred Scripture and in the tradition of the church in which the teachings of Christ, of course, are preserved."

== Report of the Synod ==
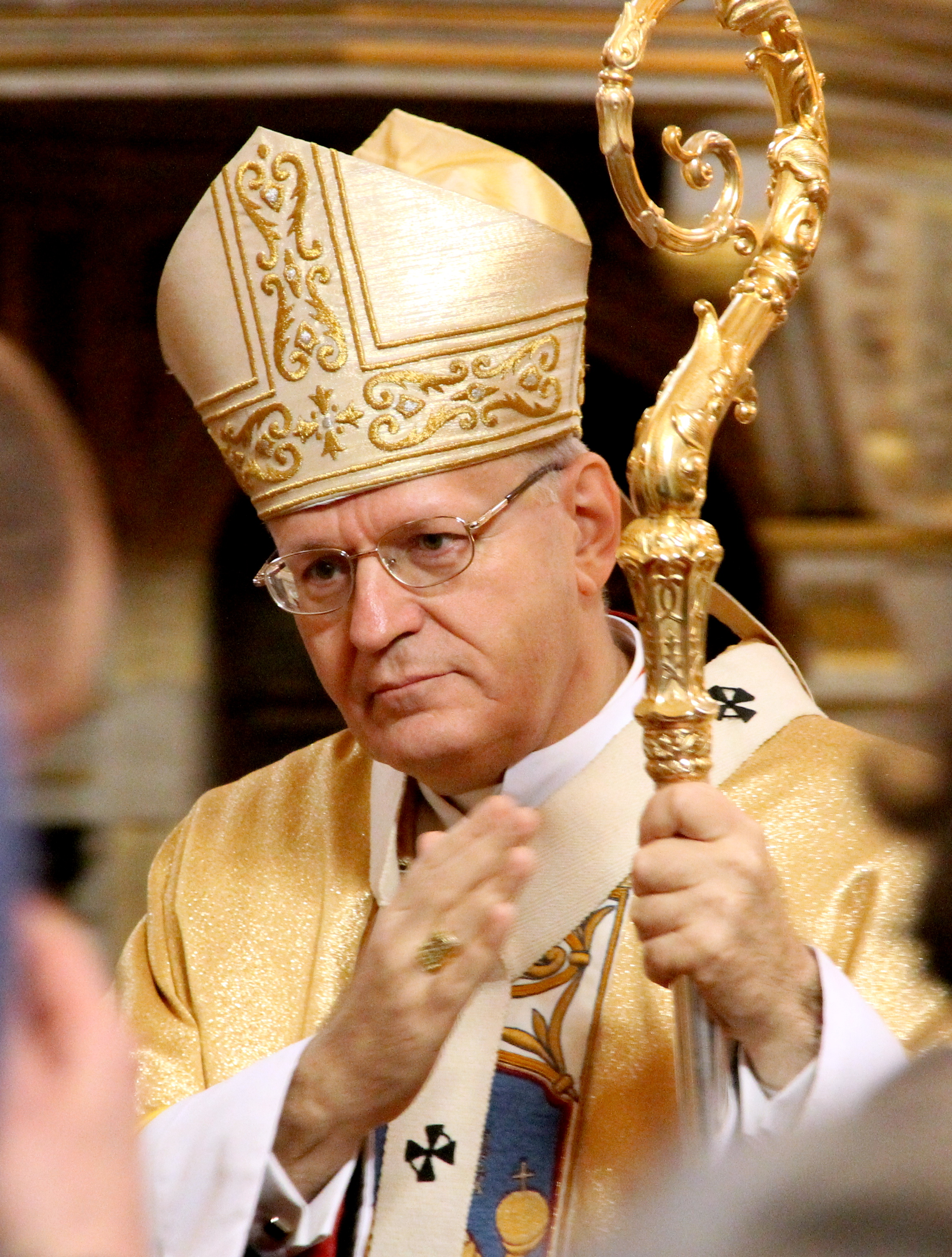
Relator Péter Erdő

After the interim report was published, it was discussed in ten small groups of bishops and other participants, who were organized by language. The work of the small groups was “fundamental, serious, and rich in ideas."

After "all the concerns expressed by the small groups [had] been taken in consideration," a draft of the final document, the relatio synodi (report of the synod), was produced. The papally-appointed drafting committee was originally composed of Erdő, Ravasi, Wuerl, Fernandez, Aguiar Retes, Bishop Peter Woo-il Kang, and Father Adolfo Nicolas Pachon, S.J. The Portuguese Bishops Conference's radio station Renascença reported that, apart from Erdő, all the members of this group were "of liberal tendency."

After several African prelates complained that there were no members from that continent, Pope Francis added African Cardinal Wilfrid Napier and Australian Archbishop Denis Hart to the committee. The draft was divided in three parts: "listening, context, and challenges of the family," "the glance to Christ: the Gospel of the Family," and "the confrontation: pastoral perspectives." It was deemed a "compromise document" that reflected "a spirited internal debate... over several major issues pertaining to the family and sexual morality."

Each paragraph of the draft was voted on separately and won a majority of bishops. Only one of the 62 paragraphs, paragraph 22, received a unanimous vote, but for most of them the votes against were only in single figures. Wuerl said that he was sure the document, taken as a whole, reflected a consensus, because "every single one of those paragraphs received a majority and only a handful didn't receive the two-thirds."

The director of the Holy See press office, Federico Lombardi, said that, though the paragraphs without two-thirds support did not express consensus, they were not completely rejected: they "cannot be considered as dismissed, but primarily as paragraphs that are not mature enough to gain a wide consensus of the assembly.” He said they require further discussion, and stressed that not even the paragraphs that obtained a two-thirds majority carried doctrinal weight.

The final report served as the working paper for the larger synod of about 250 members that would take place on 4–25 October 2015 on the "vocation and mission of the family in the church and the modern world." Journalists saw in the voting figures a strong indication of where the fault lines had been in the synod, although it is hard to tell how many voted no because they saw the text as too bold, and how many did so because they saw it as not bold enough.

The report in paragraph 56 declared altogether unacceptable the application of pressure exercised by, for example, international organizations that make legalization of same-sex marriage a condition of financial assistance. Voting on this paragraph was 159 for, 21 against.

=== Paragraphs without two-thirds support ===
Of the three paragraphs that failed to get a two-thirds majority but were included in the final report, two deal with the question of whether in some circumstances to allow divorced and civilly remarried Catholics to be admitted to the Eucharist, and the third discusses pastoral care for gay Catholics. Paragraph 52 won the least support (104 in favor, 74 against) and described the disagreement among the participants on "the possibility of giving the divorced and remarried access to the Sacraments of Penance and the Eucharist." The paragraph gave no indication of the proportion between those who favored the idea and those who rejected it, but said further study was needed. Paragraph 53 had very similar content and presentation got a slightly better reception: 112 votes in favor, and 64 against.

Paragraph 55 was the third paragraph that failed to get a two-thirds majority and was headed: "Pastoral Attention towards Persons with Homosexual Tendencies." The heading used in the a first English translation of the interim report was "Welcoming Homosexuals." It came close to a two-thirds majority, getting 118 votes for and 62 against. It speaks of the giving of appropriate pastoral care, in harmony with the Church's teaching, to gay Catholics. It declares homosexual unions in no way similar to the divine design for marriage and family, but states that gay people "ought to be received with respect and sensitivity." This was a change from the interim report's statement that homosexuals have gifts to offer the Church, and repeated Catholic teaching that "every sign of unjust discrimination in their regard should be avoided."

After the vote, Archbishop Paul-André Durocher wrote on his blog that "I have the impression many would have preferred a more open, positive language. Not finding it in this paragraph, they might have chosen to indicate their disapproval of it." Cardinal Vincent Nichols said he did not think it a good paragraph, because the absence of the key words "respect", "welcome", and "value" meant it did not go far enough. He said that there was no question in the synod of endorsing the idea of same-sex marriage or of changing the Church's teaching on sexual morality.

== Pope Francis' closing speech ==
In his closing speech, Pope Francis told the bishops that the Church needs to "chart a middle course between 'hostile rigidity' and a 'false sense of mercy'.” It was said that he was "striving mightily to hold the [conservative and progressive] camps together." While acknowledging the "moments of desolation, of tensions and temptations," Pope Francis said that the synod was "a path of solidarity," and "a journey together," not a "debating chamber."

The "temptations" Pope Francis said he wanted the Church to avoid include a "hostile inflexibility" with regard to the letter of the law, and as a result "not allowing oneself to be surprised by God, by the God of surprises." Speaking to the "progressives and liberals," he said the Church should avoid "deceptive mercy [that] binds the wounds without first curing them and treating them; that treats the symptoms and not the causes and the roots."

The third temptation was "to transform the bread into a stone and cast it against the sinners," and the fourth was "to bow down to a worldly spirit instead of purifying it and bending it to the Spirit of God." Finally, Pope Francis warned against seeing oneself as the master of the "deposit of faith," instead of its servant.

After the ten-minute speech in which he said he would be "very worried and saddened if it were not for these temptations and these animated discussions," he received a standing ovation that lasted five minutes.

== Reaction to the Synod ==
Schönborn compared the discussions at the Synod to a situation in which a mother says: "Watch out, be careful,” and the father says: "No, that's fine, go ahead.” Archbishop Joseph E. Kurtz of Louisville, Kentucky, said the final report of the synod was an improvement on the interim report and recommended that at future synods the bishops' interventions should be made publicly available. Francesco Miano, a lay participant, said there was a tension between truth and mercy.

Some reporters have suggested several leaders of the progressive camp were German-speaking, while many of the conservatives were from Africa. The 6,708% growth in the Catholic population of Africa, from 1.9 million to more than 130 million in the 20th century, has given the bishops from that continent a new prominence in the Church. With the African church "coming of age", the divisions have been described as running not "just left/right, but also north/south."

Beyond the geographical divisions, there were also generational splits seen. In particular there was a "1970s generation that seeks cultural accommodation and a younger, John Paul II-era that seeks to be countercultural."

Historian of religions Odon Vallet, commenting in the French daily 20 Minutes, said that the rejection of the language in the interim report signaled a failure of Pope Francis to advance "progressive" views that would make him think hard before trying to do the same at the 2015 synod.

Pope Francis, on the other hand, reassured the synod that the church's unity was not in danger, and warned the synod fathers of extremism on both sides.

== Post-synodal apostolic exhortation ==
From the reflexions of this synod, and the ones of the Fourteenth Ordinary General Assembly of the Synod of Bishops, Pope Francis wrote the post-synodal apostolic exhortation Amoris laetitia.

== See also ==
- Second Extraordinary General Assembly of the Synod of Bishops
