= Public propriety =

Term in the canon law of the catholic church

In the canon law of the Catholic Church, the impediment of public propriety, also called public honesty or decency, is a diriment impediment to marriage, a prohibition that prevents a marriage bond from being formed. It arises from a valid betrothal between the male party to the contract and the blood relatives of the woman in the first degree (mother, daughter, sister), and conversely between the woman and the blood relatives of the man in the same degree (father, son, brother). Once existing, the impediment always remains, even though the betrothal is lawfully broken.

Second, this impediment, for a stronger reason, arises from a marriage contract, where the marriage was not consummated, even if the marriage be invalid, unless the invalidity be due to lack of lawful consent. In cases where the marriage is consummated, public decency gives way to affinity.
