= Ceremonial marriage =

Ceremonial marriage is a common form of marriage in which a couple follows laws and procedures specified by the state in order to gain recognition of their marriage (ex. buying a marriage license, blood testing, participating in a ceremony led by an authorized official, having witnesses at a ceremony). They are often accompanied by weddings, and have different forms, reflecting particular religious and philosophical views of the couple.
