= Ligamen =

Roman Catholic marriage tie

Ligamen or vinculum is, in Roman Catholic canon law, an existing marriage tie, which constitutes an impediment to the contracting of a second marriage.

== Definition ==
Ligamen comes from the Latin word meaning "bond". In Catholic teaching, marriage forms a bond between the parties; this may be considered primarily a metaphysical or ontological bond which cannot be dissolved, or primarily a moral bond of obligation which should not be dissolved. Whether and to what degree the same bond is present in natural marriages as in sacramental marriages is a matter of dispute among Catholic theologians.

The existence of a valid marriage at the moment of forming a second implies the invalidity of the latter.

If one of the parties of a divorced couple (the Petitioner) then wishes to enter into a sacramental marriage with a third party and can show that his/her former spouse (the Respondent) was already married to someone else (the Co-Respondent) who was alive at the time of the wedding between the Respondent and the Plaintiff, and that the Church had not declared the first marriage null, Respondent's first marriage is presumed valid. The Petitioner may then file a Ligamen request for a determination that Respondent/Petitioner marriage was invalid since the Respondent had an existing prior marriage bond.

A putative marriage must be presumed valid, and so constituting the impediment of ligamen, until it is proven invalid.

Should the Respondent/Petitioner marriage have been contracted in good faith, if only by the Partitioner, and yet the marriage is invalid, the parties to it must be separated by the ecclesiastical authorities, and the first marriage re-established. However, the invalid marriage would still be a putative marriage. Once the Co-Respondent dies, the later marriage may be established. Should the Petitioner demand it, the Respondent is then bound to contract marriage validly.

Since monogamy and the indissolubility of marriage are founded on natural law, ligamen is binding on non-Catholics and on the unbaptized. If an unbaptized person living in polygamy becomes a Christian, he must keep the wife he had first married and release the second, in case the first wife is converted with him. Otherwise, by virtue of the "Pauline privilege", the converted husband may choose one of his wives who allows herself to be baptized.

== See also ==
- Bigamy
