= Validation of marriage =

Process in Catholic canon law

In Catholic canon law, a validation of marriage or convalidation of marriage is the validation of a Catholic putative marriage. A putative marriage is one when at least one party to the marriage wrongly believes it to be valid. Validation involves the removal of a canonical impediment, or its dispensation, or the removal of defective consent. However, the children of a putative marriage are legitimate.

== Simple convalidation ==
If the impediment to a marriage is a defective consent by one or both parties, a simple renewal of consent removes the impediment and can effect validation.

"To convalidate a marriage which is invalid because of a diriment impediment, it is required that the impediment ceases or is dispensed and that at least the party conscious of the impediment renews consent." "The renewal of consent must be a new act of the will concerning a marriage which the renewing party knows or thinks was null from the beginning." "If the impediment is public, both parties must renew the consent in canonical form, without prejudice to the prescript of can. 1127".

== Radical sanation ==
A bishop can give a dispensation to an impediment, giving the marriage retroactive validation called radical sanation or sanatio in radice (Latin: "healing in the root"). Some impediments can only be dispensed by the pope, others may be dispensed by the diocesan bishop, while others cannot be dispensed (consanguinity in the direct line or in the second degree of the collateral line).

Sanatio in radice retroactively dispenses the impediment and makes a putative marriage valid from the time the sanatio is granted. The sanatio validates a marriage by reason of a consent formerly given, but ineffective because of an impediment. When the impediment is removed or dispensed, the consent is ipso facto ratified and no renovation is required. In such a case, it is requisite that the consent of both parties to the marriage had not ceased and that their marriage had had the external appearance of a true marriage.

== Bibliography ==
Code of Canon Law - Wm. Woestman, Canon Law of the Sacraments for Parish Ministry, Ottawa 2007.
