= Putative marriage =

Legal status

A putative marriage is an apparently valid marriage, entered into in good faith on the part of at least one of the partners, but that is legally invalid due to a technical impediment, such as a preexistent marriage on the part of one of the partners. Unlike someone in a common-law, statutory, or ceremonial marriage, a putative spouse is not legally married. Instead, a putative spouse believes themself to be married in good faith and is given legal rights as a result of this person's reliance upon this good-faith belief.

Putative marriages exist in both Catholic canon law and in various civil laws, though the rules may vary. In some jurisdictions, putative marriages are a matter of case law rather than legislation. In many jurisdictions, under civil law, the marriage becomes valid if the impediment is removed. If it is not removed, the innocent spouse, at least, is often entitled to the protections of a divorce for division of property and child custody.

== Catholic canon law ==
In Catholic canon law, there are a number of requirements for a valid Catholic marriage. However, a Catholic marriage is considered valid unless and until it is proved otherwise. In consequence, children born as a result of a marriage which is found to be void are considered legitimate, and the spouses cannot marry others without first obtaining an annulment by proving its invalidity. If the invalidity is proven, an annulment can be granted.

Only marriages which have the appearance of validity are considered putative. Consequently, if form is altogether lacking, then the marriage is not considered putative, and the marriage does not enjoy the presumption of validity.

If the impediment is removed, or a dispensation granted, and if consent perdures, the marriage can be convalidated.

== Putative marriage in the United States ==
Many U.S. states have a concept of a putative spouse. The doctrine is particularly applied in matters of divorce or inheritance.

A number of states followed the example of the Uniform Marriage and Divorce Act (also sometimes called the Model Marriage and Divorce Act) to establish the concept of a "Putative Spouse" by statute. The concept has been codified in California, Colorado, Illinois, Louisiana, Minnesota and Montana. Case law provides for putative spouse rights in Nebraska, Washington state, Nevada, Texas and Louisiana. Colorado and Montana are the only U.S. states to have both common law marriage and to formally recognize putative spouse status. Putative spouse concepts, called "deemed marriages" are also recognized under the Social Security program in the United States.

In Colorado, which is typical, "Any person who has cohabited with another person to whom he is not legally marriaged in the good faith belief that he was married to that person is a putative spouse until knowledge of the fact that he is not legally married terminates his status and prevents acquisition of further rights." Section 14-2-111, Colorado Revised Statutes.

Putative spouse status is a remedial doctrine designed to protect the reasonable expectations of someone who acts on the belief that they are married, and generally entitled a putative spouse to the rights a legal spouse would have for the period from the putative marriage until discovery that the marriage was not legal. It is possible that a person could have both a legal spouse and someone as a putative spouse, as when a person remarries, not realizing that the divorce decree had not been made final for their original marriage; in which case, courts are directed to do what seems appropriate in the circumstances.

Unlike a common law marriage, which is possible only when both spouses are legally eligible to marry, putative spouse status can be unilateral. For example, if a husband is married, but goes through a marriage ceremony without informing the woman with whom he goes through with the ceremony of that fact, the husband is not a putative spouse, because he knows that he has no legal ability to marry. The wife however is a putative spouse because she in good faith believes that she is legally married, and has no knowledge that she is not legally married.

In the example above, the putative wife who believed she was married could seek the property division and alimony awards that a legal spouse could have, when the putative spouse discovers that she is not legally married, but her husband could not seek a property division in the putative wife's name or alimony from her, because he knew that their marriage was not legal.

If, on the other hand, the husband had had reliable but incorrect information that his first wife was dead, both the husband and the wife would have the status of putative spouse.

== See also ==
- Common-law marriage
