= Tomba (disambiguation) =

Tomba may refer to:

== Places ==
- Tomba, Montenegro, a town in Bar, Montenegro
- Tomba-kanssa, a town in Kankan, Guinea
- Cavaso del Tomba, a municipality in Veneto, Italy
- Mereto di Tomba, a municipality in Friuli–Venezia Giulia, Italy
- Tomba di Senigallia, former name of Castel Colonna, a former municipality in Marche, Italy
- Tomba di Pesaro, former name of Tavullia, a municipality in Marche, Italy

== People ==
- Captain Tomba, 18th-century African ruler who was enslaved
- Tomba (given name), people with the given name Tomba
- Tomba (surname), people with the surname Tomba

== Other uses ==
- Tomba!, a 1997 PlayStation video game
- Tomba! 2: The Evil Swine Return, a 1999 PlayStation video game
- Dongba script
- Club Deportivo Godoy Cruz Antonio Tomba, an Argentine sports club
