= Catholic Church in India =

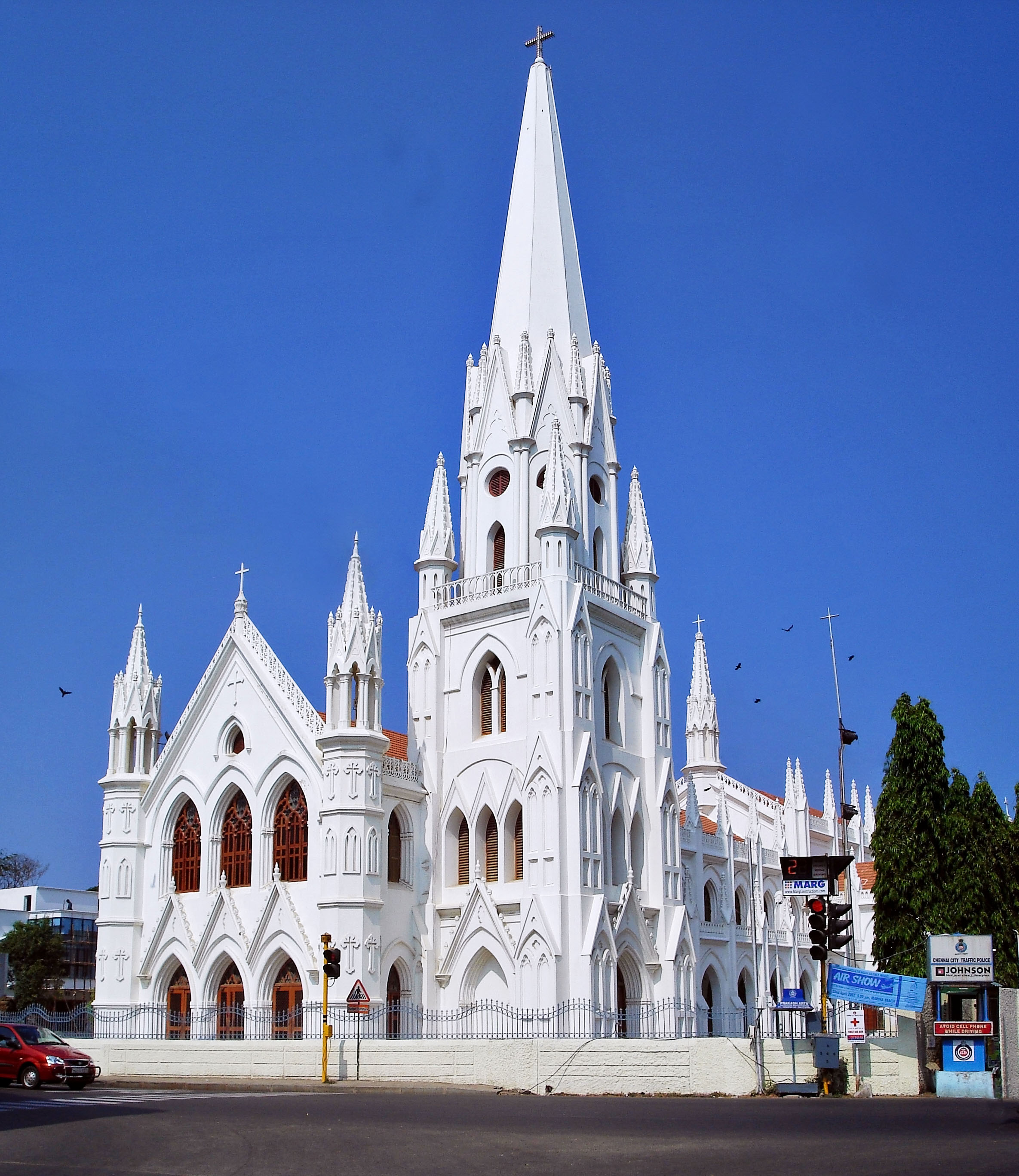
- Mylapore's Santhome Basilica at Madras (Chennai), built in 1523 by the Portuguese in Goa and Bombay, over the tomb of Thomas the Apostle. Renovated in 1896 by British Indian architects. It is an important shrine of the apostolic age in the world.
- Type: Christian denomination
- Classification: Catholic
- Orientation: Eastern & Western
- Scripture: Catholic Bible
- Theology: Catholic theology
- Polity: Episcopal polity
- Governance: CBCI
- Pope: Leo XIV
- President of bishops' conference: Andrews Thazhath
- Region: India
- Language: Multiple
- Headquarters: New Delhi
- Founder: Thomas the Apostle
- Origin: AD 52 (1974 years ago)
- Members: 22.24 million according to World Christian Database (2023)

The Catholic Church in India is part of the worldwide Catholic Church under the leadership of the Pope. There are about 22.24 (2023) million Catholics in India, representing around 1.57% of the total population, and the Catholic Church is the single largest Christian church in India accounting for about 31.3 to 37 percent of Indian Christians. There are 10,701 parishes that make up 174 dioceses and eparchies, which are organised into 30 ecclesiastical provinces. Of these, 132 dioceses are of the Latin Church, 31 of the Syro-Malabar Catholic Church and 11 of the Syro-Malankara Catholic Church. Despite the very small percentage-wise population that Indian Catholics make up in the country, India still has the second-largest Christian population in Asia, after the Catholic Church in the Philippines. All Catholic bishops, from all dioceses, come together to form the Catholic Bishops Conference of India, first convened in British India, in 1944. The ambassador representing the Holy See to the Government of India, is the Apostolic Nuncio to India. The diplomatic mission of the Holy See to India, similar to an embassy, was established as the Apostolic delegation to the East Indies in 1881. It was raised to an Internunciature by Pope Pius XII in 1948, and to a full Apostolic Nunciature by Pope Paul VI in 1967. Archbishop Leopoldo Girelli is the current Apostolic Nuncio, named by Pope Francis on 13 March 2021. The Apostolic Nunciature is located at 50-C, Niti Marg, Chanakyapuri, New Delhi.

The majority, about 78.3%, belong to the Latin Church, the rest are Syrian Catholic Christians. The Syro-Malabar Church, one of the Eastern Catholic Churches, makes up around 19.7% of Indian Catholics, while the Syro-Malankara Church accounts for approximately 2.0%. These figures reflect the diverse liturgical traditions within Indian Catholicism, with Eastern Catholic communities primarily based in the Malabar region (present-day state of Kerala).

== History ==
=== Early Christianity in India ===
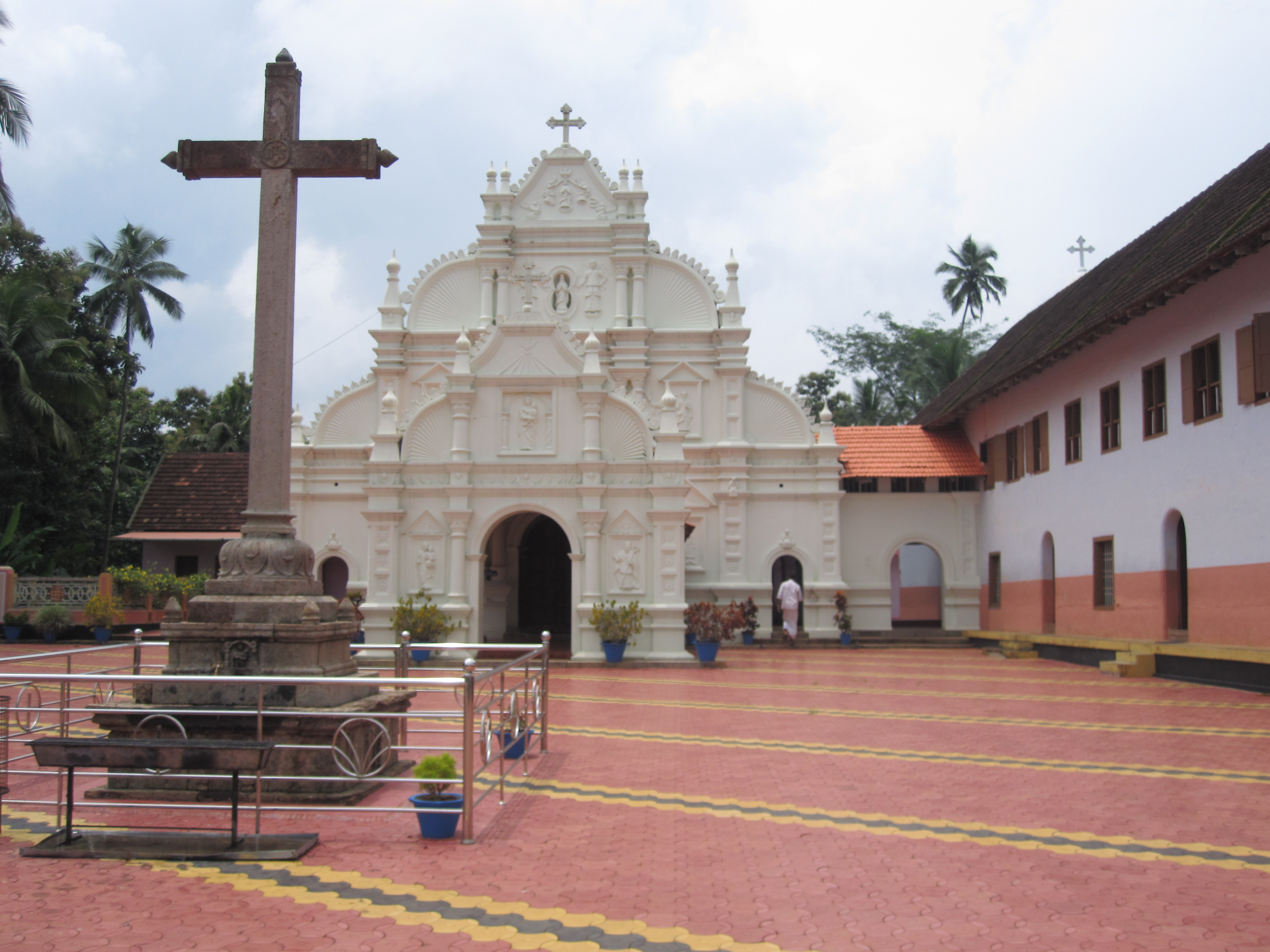
Marth Mariam Syro-Malabar Catholic Church at Arakuzha, Kerala, is an ancient Nasrani church established in 999.

Latin Church provinces and dioceses of the Catholic church in India. The dioceses making up a province have different shades of the same colour.

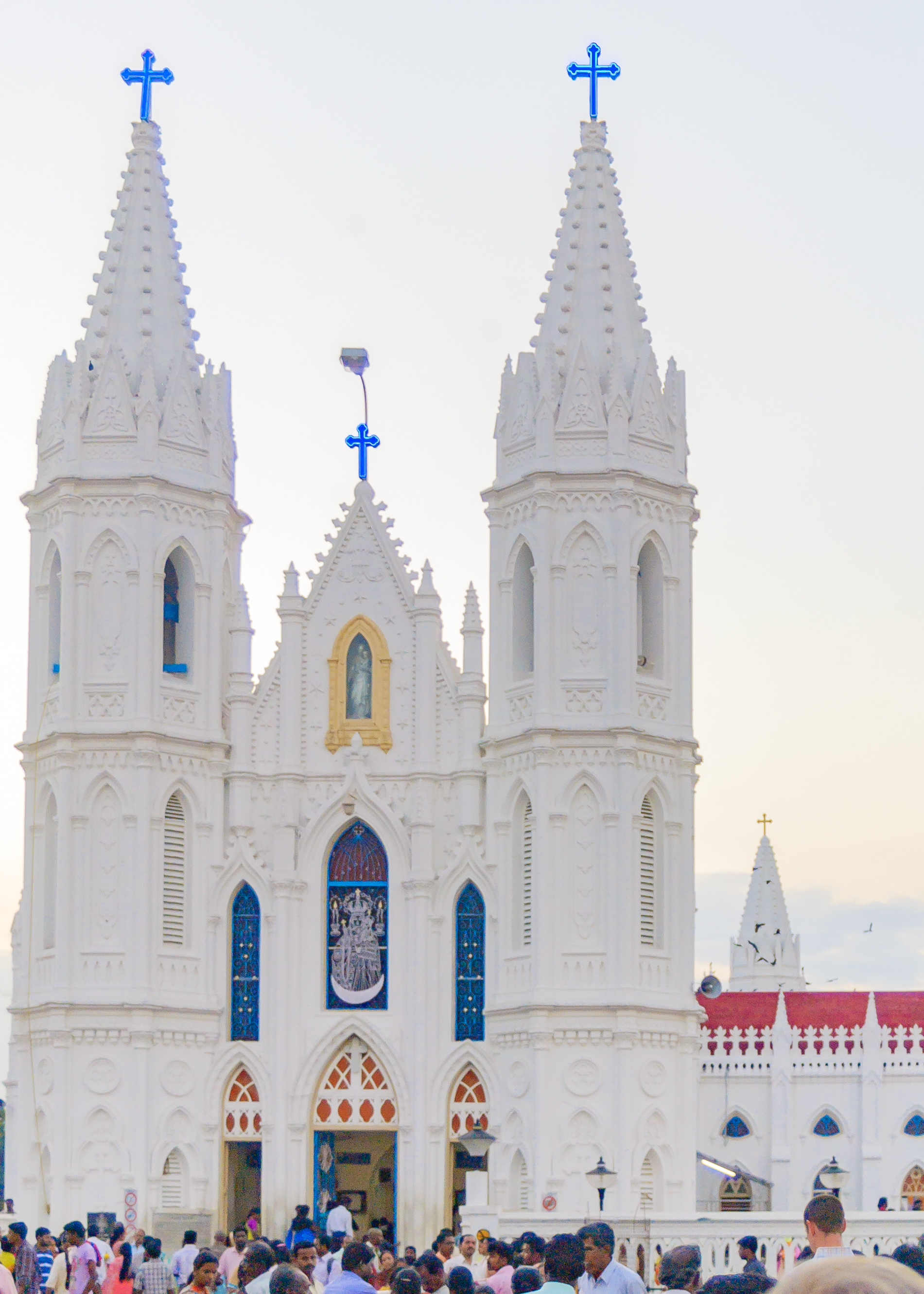
A facade of the Basilica of Our Lady of Vailankanni, in Tamil Nadu (the Coromandel region).

Christianity reached India in AD 52 when Thomas the Apostle reached Muziris in Malabar Coast presently called the state of Kerala. He preached Christianity in Eastern and Western coasts of India. These Saint Thomas Christians are known as Nasrani, which is a Syriac term meaning Follower of the Nazarene Jesus. The Christian community in India later came under the jurisdiction of Bishops from Persia. Historians estimate this date to be around the fourth century. As a result, they inherited the East Syriac liturgy and traditions of Persia. Later, when the Western missionaries reached India, they accused this community of practicing Nestorianism, a heresy that separates Christ's divinity from his human nature. They formed the most ancient church, diocese, and metropolitan province in the Indian subcontinent and the Far East. The East Syriac diocese of India was elevated as a metropolitan province in the eighth century by Patriarch Ishoyab III. In the words of Pope John Paul II, this community, while being a part of the East Syriac Church, had never broken the communion with the worldwide Catholic Church explicitly. Today, the continuity of this early Christian community is found in the Syro-Malabar Catholic Church, an Oriental Church in communion with Catholic Church, following East Syriac traditions.

=== Early missionaries ===
John of Monte Corvino was a Franciscan sent to China to become prelate of Peking in around 1307. He travelled from Persia and moved down by sea to India, in 1291, to the Madras region or "Country of St. Thomas". There he preached for thirteen months and baptised about one hundred persons. From there Monte Corvino wrote home, in December 1291 (or 1292). That is one of the earliest noteworthy accounts of the Coromandel coast furnished by any Western European. Travelling by sea from Mailapur, he reached China in 1294, appearing in the capital "Cambaliech" (now Beijing).

Friar Odoric of Pordenone arrived in India in 1321. He visited Malabar, touching at Pandarani (20 m. north of Calicut), at Cranganore, and at Kulam or Quilon, proceeding thence, apparently, to Ceylon and to the shrine of St Thomas at Maylapur near Madras. He writes he had found the place where Thomas was buried.

Father Jordanus Catalanus, a French Dominican missionary, followed in 1321–22. He reported to Rome, apparently from somewhere on the west coast of India, that he had given Christian burial to four martyred monks. Jordanus is known for his 1329 "Mirabilia" describing the marvels of the East: he furnished the best account of Indian regions and the Christians, the products, climate, manners, customs, fauna and flora given by any European in the Middle Ages – superior even to Marco Polo's.

The Diocese of Quilon headquartered at Kollam is the first Roman Catholic diocese in India in the state of Kerala, first erected on 9 August 1329 and re-erected on 1 September 1886. In 1329 Pope John XXII (in captivity at Avignon) erected Quilon as the first Diocese in the whole Indies as suffragan to the Archdiocese of Sultany in Persia, through the decree "Romanus Pontifix" dated 9 August 1329. By a separate Bull "Venerabili Fratri Jordano", the same Pope, on 21 August 1329 appointed the French Dominican friar Jordanus Catalani de Severac (OP) as the first Bishop of Quilon. (Copies of the Orders and the related letters issued by Pope John XXII to Bishop Jordanus Catalani (OP) and to the diocese of Quilon are documented and preserved in the diocesan archives). In 1347, Giovanni de Marignolli visited the shrine of St Thomas near the modern Madras, and then proceeded to what he calls the kingdom of Saba, and identifies with the Sheba of Scripture, but which seems from various particulars to have been Java. Taking ship again for Malabar on his way to Europe, he encountered great storms.

Another prominent Indian traveller was Joseph, priest over Cranganore. He journeyed to Babylon in 1490 and then sailed to Europe and visited Portugal, Rome, and Venice before returning to India. He helped to write a book about his travels titled The Travels of Joseph the Indian which was widely disseminated across Europe.

=== Arrival of the Portuguese ===
In 1453, the fall of Constantinople, a bastion of Christianity in Asia Minor to Islamic Ottoman Empire, marked the end of the Eastern Roman Empire or Byzantine Empire, and severed European trade links by land with Asia. This massive blow to Christendom spurred the Age of Discovery as Europeans were seeking alternative routes east by sea along with the goal of forging alliances with pre-existing Christian nations. Along with pioneer Portuguese long-distance maritime travellers, that reached the Malabar Coast in the late 15th century, came Portuguese missionaries who introduced the Latin Catholic church in India. They made contact with the St Thomas Christians in Kerala, which at that time were following Eastern Christian practices and were under the jurisdiction of Church of the East.

In the 16th century, the proselytism of Asia was linked to the Portuguese colonial policy. The Papal bull Romanus Pontifex, written on 8 January 1455 by Pope Nicholas V to King Afonso V of Portugal, confirmed to the Crown of Portugal dominion over all lands discovered or conquered during the age of discovery. Further, the patronage for the propagation of the Christian faith (see "Padroado") in Asia was given to the Portuguese. The missionaries of the different orders (Franciscans, Dominicans, Jesuits, Augustinians, etc.) flocked out with the conquerors, and began at once to build churches along the coastal districts where the Portuguese power made itself felt.

The history of Portuguese missionaries in India starts with the neo-apostles who reached Kappad near Kozhikode on 20 May 1498 along with the Portuguese explorer Vasco da Gama who was seeking to form anti-Islamic alliances with pre-existing Christian nations. The lucrative spice trade was further temptation for the Portuguese crown. When he and the Portuguese missionaries arrived they found no Christians in the country, except in Malabar known as St. Thomas Christians who represented less than 2% of the total population and the then-largest Christian church within India. The Christians were friendly to Portuguese missionaries at first; there was an exchange of gifts between them, and these groups were delighted at their common faith.

During the second expedition, the Portuguese fleet comprising 13 ships and 18 priests, under Captain Pedro Álvares Cabral, anchored at Cochin on 26 November 1500. Cabral soon won the goodwill of the Raja of Cochin. He allowed four priests to do apostolic work among the early Christian communities scattered in and around Cochin. Thus Portuguese missionaries established Portuguese Mission in 1500. Dom Francisco de Almeida, the first Portuguese Viceroy, got permission from the Kochi Raja to build two church edifices – namely Santa Cruz Basilica (founded 1505) and St. Francis Church (founded 1506) using stones and mortar which was unheard of at that time as the local prejudices were against such a structure for any purpose other than a royal palace or a temple.

=== Primate of the East ===
In the beginning of the 16th century, the whole of the East Indies were under the jurisdiction of the Archdiocese of Lisbon. On 12 June 1514, Cochin, Goa-Anjediva and Bombay-Bassein became the prominent fields of missionary activity; under the newly created Diocese of Funchal in Madeira. In 1534, Pope Paul III, by the Bull Quequem Reputamus, raised Funchal as an archdiocese and Goa as its suffragan, deputing the whole of India under the diocese of Goa. This created an episcopal see – suffragan to Funchal, with a jurisdiction extending potentially over all past and future conquests from the Cape of Good Hope to China.

Portuguese explorers arrived in Chennai in 1523 and built the Santhome Church over the tomb of Saint Thomas the Apostle, it was the first church in Chennai (Madras). In 1545, Francis Xavier visited this church, prayed in the Tomb of St Thomas and stayed for about one year before his Apostolic trip to China. This church was later elevated to the status of a cathedral in 1606 by Pope Paul V, with the inauguration of the Diocese of Saint Thomas of Mylapore at the request of Portuguese King. Later the cathedral church was rebuilt by the British in 1896 with the style of Neo Gothic. It was made a basilica in 1927 by Pope Pius XII.

Around 1540, missionaries from the newly founded Society of Jesus arrived in Goa. The Portuguese government supported their work, as well as the work of the other religious orders in Goa (Dominicans, Franciscans & so on) who had been arriving since the Portuguese conquest of Goa in 1510. Native Goans who converted were rewarded by the government with Portuguese citizenship. At the same time, many New Christians from Portugal migrated to India as a result of the Portuguese Inquisition. Many of them were suspected of being Crypto-Jews and Crypto-Muslims, converted Jews and Muslims who were secretly practicing their old religions. Both were considered a threat to the solidarity of Christian belief. Saint Francis Xavier, in a 1545 letter to John III of Portugal, requested the Goan Inquisition but the tribunal was set up only in 1560.

In 1557, Goa was made an independent archbishopric, and its first suffragan sees were erected at Cochin and Malacca. The whole of the East came under the jurisdiction of Goa and its boundaries extended to almost half of the world: from the Cape of Good Hope in South Africa, to Burma, China and Japan in East Asia. In 1576 the suffragan See of Macao (China) was added; and in 1588, that of Funai in Japan.

The death of the last East Syriac metropolitan Archbishop – Mar Abraham of the St Thomas Christians, an ancient body formerly part of the Church of the East in 1597; gave the then Archbishop of Goa Menezes an opportunity to bring the native church under the authority of the Latin Catholic hierarchy. He was able to secure the submission of Archdeacon George, the highest remaining representative of the native church hierarchy. Menezes convened the Synod of Diamper between 20 and 26 June 1599, which introduced a number of reforms to the church and brought it fully into his control. Following the Synod, Menezes consecrated Francis Ros, SJ, as Archbishop of the Archdiocese of Angamalé for the Saint Thomas Christians; this created another suffragan see to Archdiocese of Goa and Latinisation of St Thomas Christians started, against the wish of St Thomas Christians (East Syrian Tradition). The Saint Thomas Christians were pressured to acknowledge the authority of the Pope and most of them eventually accepted the Catholic faith, but a part of them switched to West Syriac Rite. Resentment of these measures led some part of the community to join the Archdeacon Thomas I, in swearing never to submit to the Portuguese or to accept Jesuits as their masters in the Coonan Cross Oath in 1653. Those who accepted the West Syrian theological and liturgical tradition of Mar Gregorios became known as Jacobites. The ones who continued with East Syriac liturgical tradition came to be formally known as the Syro-Malabar Church from the second half of the 19th century onward.

The Diocese of Angamaly was transferred to Diocese of Cranganore in 1605; while, in 1606 a sixth suffragan see to Goa was established at San Thome, Mylapore, near the modern Madras. The suffragan sees added later to Goa were the prelacy of Mozambique (1612) and in 1690 two other sees at Peking and Nanking in China.

Missionary work progressed on a large scale along the western coasts, chiefly in Portuguese Bombay and Bassein, that extended from Damaon and Diu, to Salsette Island and Chaul; the missions were a great success until the Mahratta Invasions of Goa-Anjediva and Bombay-Bassein, during which a number of churches and convents were demolished. Conversions were also carried out on the eastern coasts at San Thome of Mylapore and as far as Portuguese Chittagong, and beyond Bengal in the East Indies. In the southern districts the Jesuit mission in Madura was the most famous, it extended to the Krishna river, with a number of outlying stations beyond it; the mission of Cochin in the Malabar region of South India, was also one of the most fruitful, until the persecution of Catholic Christians by Dutch Calvinists, in former Portuguese lands began. Several missions were also established in the interior northwards, for eg, that of Agra and Lahore in 1570 and that of Tibet in 1624. Still, even with these efforts, the greater part even of the coast line was by no means fully worked, and many vast tracts of the interior northwards were practically untouched.

With the onslaught of the Dutch and decline of the Portuguese power, other colonial powers – namely the British and other Christian nations gained influence.

=== 18th century ===
Bettiah Christians, the northern Indian subcontinent's oldest Christian community, was established in the 18th century by Italian Christian missionaries belonging to the Order of Friars Minor Capuchin, a Roman Catholic religious order. The patron of the Bettiah Christian Mission was Maharaja Dhurup Singh, king of the Bettiah Raj in Hindustan, who requested Giuseppe Maria Bernini to treat his ill wife and was successful in doing so. The Bettiah Christian Mission flourished under the patronage of the royal court of the Bettiah Rajas, growing in number.

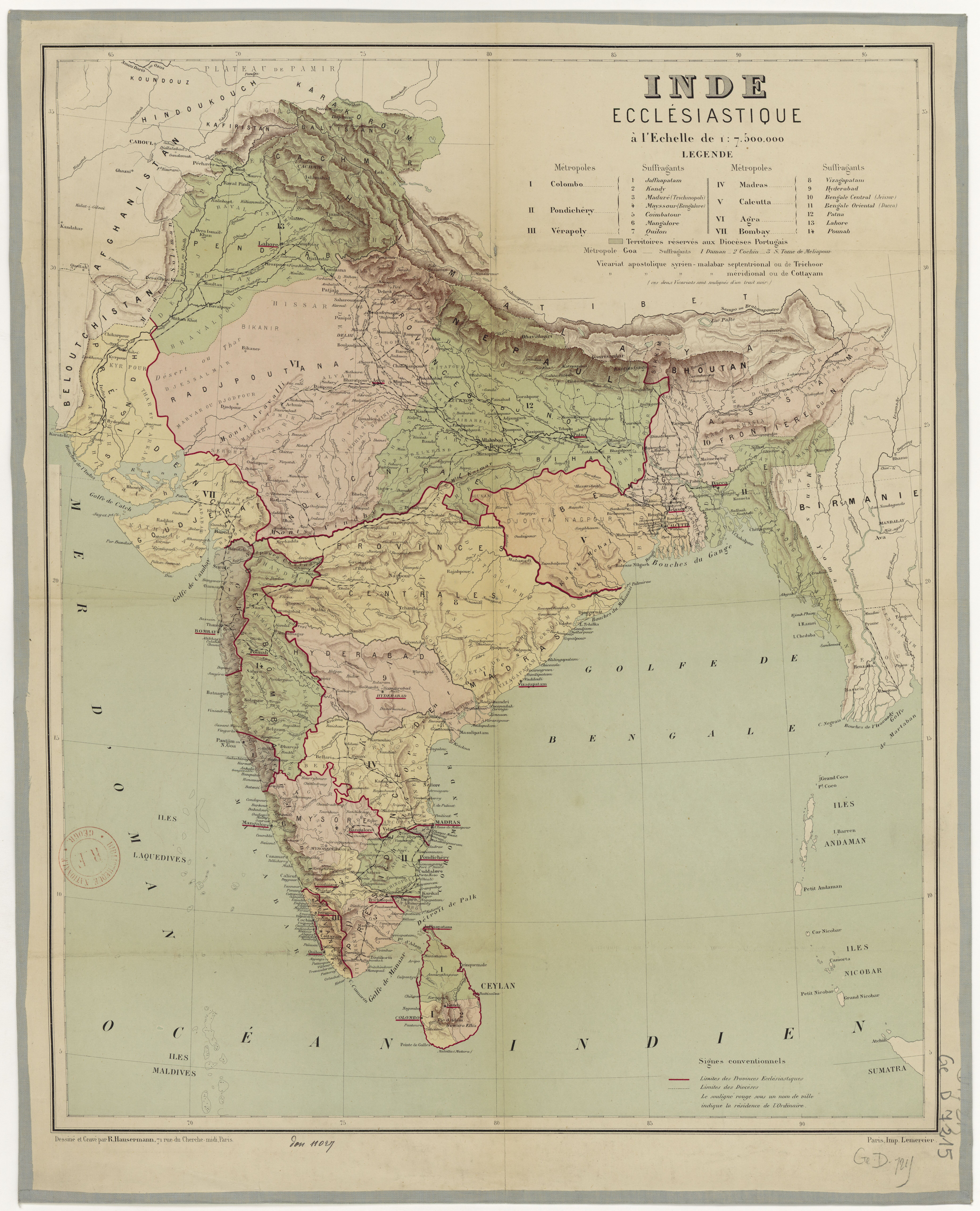
Map showing the Catholic dioceses in India around 1888

The Portuguese spread the Catholic faith in Goa, then in Cape Comorin, inland districts of Madurai and the western coast of Bassein, Salcette, Bombay, Karanja, and Chaul. With the advent of suppression of Jesuits in 1773 the missionary expansion declined in India along with the need for organisations within the Church in India. Especially when the Vicar Apostolate of Bombay was erected in 1637 which was under the direct ruling from Rome, this caused misunderstanding between the Portuguese missionary and the Apostolate. The Inquisition of Goa had caused strained relationship and mistrust with the Hindus of India. The strained relations between the Church and the Portuguese missionaries reached a climax when in 1838 the Holy See cancelled the jurisdiction of the three suffragan Sees of Crangaqnore, Cochin, and Mylapur and transferred it to the nearest vicars Apostolic, and did the same with regard to certain portions of territory which had formerly been under the authority of Goa itself. Finally in 1886 another concordat was established, and at the same time the whole country was divided into ecclesiastical provinces, and certain portions of territory, withdrawn in 1838, were restored to the jurisdiction of the Portuguese sees.

=== Role in the Indian independence movement ===
On 30 October 1945 in the All India Conference of Indian Christians (AICIC) formed a joint committee with the Catholic Union of India to form a joint committee that passed a resolution in which, "in the future constitution of India, the profession, practice and propagation of religion should be guaranteed and that a change of religion should not involve any civil or political disability." This joint committee enabled the Christians in India to stand united, and in front of the British Parliamentary Delegation "the committee members unanimously supported the move for independence and expressed complete confidence in the future of the community in India." The office for this joint committee was opened in Delhi, in which the Vice-Chancellor of Andhra University M. Rahnasamy served as president and B.L. Rallia Ram of Lahore served as General Secretary. Six members of the joint committee were elected to the Minorities Committee of the Constituent Assembly of India. In its meeting on 16 April 1947 and 17 April 1947, the joint committee of the All India Conference of Indian Christians and All India Catholic Union prepared a 13-point memorandum that was sent to the Constituent Assembly, which asked for religious freedom for both organisations and individuals; this came to be reflected in the Constitution of India.

== Social services ==
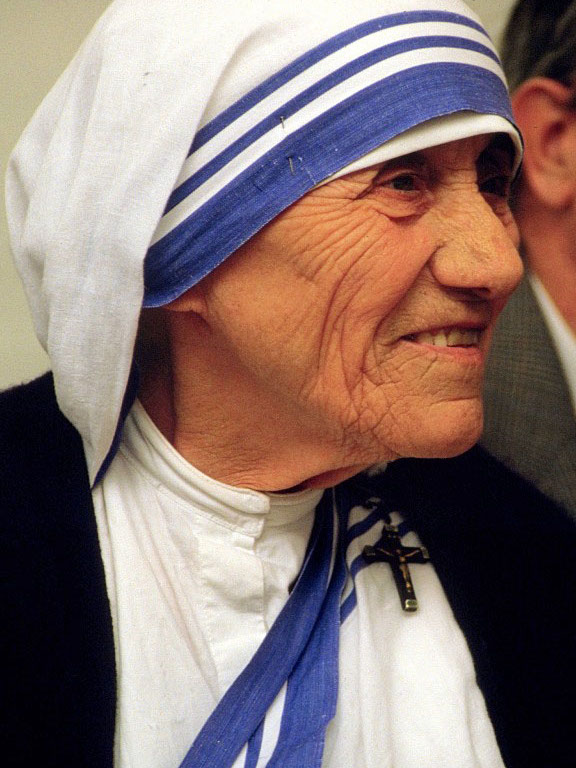
Mother Teresa

Concern with charity was common to Catholics and Protestants, but with one major difference: whilst the former believe that salvation comes from faith in God and dedication to good works, which can manifest itself as charity, the latter believe that only one's faith alone is a sufficient requisite of salvation, and that one's works are not necessary to gain or lose salvation. Consequently, Catholic charitable efforts in India have been extensive.

In Portuguese India, for instance, Saint Francis Xavier and his fellow missionaries were especially careful to help the local charitable institutions by tending to the sick, both spiritually and physically, and performing other works of mercy. The Jesuits' educational institutions have left a prestigious impact through their education institutions. Education has become the major priority for the Church in India in recent years with nearly 60% of the Catholic schools situated in rural areas. Even in the early part of the 19th century, Catholic schools had emphasised relief for the poor and their welfare.

In 2019, Father Vineeth George, a 38-year-old Catholic priest, was awarded as the 'Best Citizen of India'. The title is an acknowledgment of his work with the marginalized in the north of the country.

== Demographics ==
Various surveys and reports provide different total count for Indian Catholics. In 2011, Pew Research Center reported 10,570,000 Catholics (33.19%), out of a total of 31,850,000 Christians in India, based on their analysis of 2001 census of India. According to a 2021 Pew survey of Indian Christians, Catholics constituted the single largest Christian denomination in India, accounting for 37% of Christians in the country.

According to the World Christian Database, 71,120,000 Indians or 5% of the total population of India are Christians, as of 2023. Out of this, 22,241,000 (31.3%) individuals are Catholic. In 2025, the World Religion Database estimated that 1.56% of all Indians are Catholic. Other sources estimate the total number of Indian Catholics at around 17 million, which is approximately 1.6 percent of India's population.

== Church Statistics ==
Statistics for 2011

- Bishops: 126
- Diocesan priests: 9,322
- Religious priests: 6,765
- Religious brothers: 2,528
- Religious Sisters: 50,112
- Colleges and schools: 14,429
- Training Institutes: 1,086
- Hospitals and dispensaries: 1,826
- Publications: 292

== See also ==
- Bombay East Indian Catholics
- Catholic Church in Bhutan
- Catholic Church in Nepal
- Catholic Church in Tibet
- Catholic Church in Sri Lanka
- Goan Catholics
- Goan Catholics under the British Empire
- Latin Catholics of Malabar
- List of Catholic dioceses in India
- List of Catholic churches in India
- List of saints of India
- Reddy Catholics
- Bettiah Christians
- Mangalorean Christians
- Christianity in India

== Literature ==
- Becker, Christopher (2007). Sebastian Karotemprel (ed.). The Catholic Church in Northeast India 1890–1915. Shillong: Becker Institute Sacred Heart Theological College. OCLC 311601683.
- Frykenberg, Robert E. (2008). Christianity in India: From Beginnings to the Present. Oxford: Oxford University Press. ISBN 9780198263777.
- Wilmshurst, David (2000). The Ecclesiastical Organisation of the Church of the East, 1318–1913. Louvain: Peeters Publishers. ISBN 9789042908765.
