= Maharaja Harendra Kishore Public Library =

Depository library in Bihar, India

- 26.799974581467264°N 84.50440604942916°E
- Location: Soa Babu Chowk, Bettiah, West Champaran, Bihar, India
- Type: Public
- Established: 1905

Collection
- Items collected: Books, Newspaper Periodicals, Braille Books, Digital Media
- Legal deposit: National Depository Centre

Other information
- Director: Mr. Lalan Jha
- Website: maharajapubliclibrary.org

Maharaja Harendra Kishore Public Library is a depository library in Bettiah in West Champaran district in the Indian state of Bihar. It was established in 1905 as Victoria Memorial Library and was renamed to its present name, Maharaja Harendra Kishore Public Library on Maharaja Sir Harendra Kishore Singh's birthday in 1955.

The library functions under the Government of Bihar and development activities are carried by the Digital Empowerment Foundation and the Bill & Melinda Gates Foundation. The District Education Officer (DEO) serves as the president of the library. Presently, Mr. Lalan Jha is the president of the library. On 21 February 2013, Maharaja Harendra Kishore District Public Library Resource Center was established as an initiative of Bill & Melinda Gates Foundation's Gates Global Library Project by the state government of Bihar with the help of Digital Empowerment Foundation.

== History ==
Maharaja Harendra Kishore Public Library was established in 1905 as Victoria Memorial Library and continued to function at Chitragupta Maidan in Bettiah from 1905 to 1934. In 1936, the library was shifted to the land of Bettiah Raj following the earth quake in 1934. In 1955, on Bettiah Raj last king Maharaja Sir Harendra Kishore Singh's birthday, the library was renamed from Victoria Memorial Library to its present name, Maharaja Harendra Kishore Public Library and a statue of the king was established in the library premises. It was promoted to the status of the library of sub-division by the state government of Bihar in 1958. In 1980, the library was promoted to the status of "central district library".

== Infrastructure ==
The library is established in an area of 1.45 acre and surrounded by boundary. It has four princely hall rooms comprising three depository rooms, one reading room, one office and one bathroom. There is a stage made in the east, which is used to host cultural functions and various other programs.

== Vision ==
- To avail rural people free access to information resources and services.
- To effectively manage the district public library harnessing benefit of development of the digital catalog system.
- To make functional access to the information and communication technology in the district public library.

== Facility ==
- Internet - The library provides internet access to its members to read national/international news paper online and to online submit application forms.
- Printing/Scanning/Photocopy - Printing, scanning and photocopy services are available to the registered members of the library.
- IT Training - The library also provides Information Technology training to the local population.
- Career Counselling - The library provides career counselling to the youth of the city and around on various vocational and higher education studies.

== Membership ==
Any person that is native of India is eligible to be a member of the library.
