= Sisters of the Sacred Heart =

Religious order within the Catholic Church

- Formation: June 11, 1926; 100 years ago
- Founder: The Most Reverend Louise Van Hoeck
- Type: Catholic religious order
- Legal status: Religious congregation
- Parent organization: Catholic Church

The Sisters of the Sacred Heart is a Roman Catholic religious order founded in the Indian city of Bettiah in 1927. Their charism is "education and catechetical instruction, care of the sick and social service according to the needs of the church and time."

== History ==
The Sisters of the Sacred Heart was founded on 11 June 1926 by Bishop Louis Van Hoeck in the city of Bettiah, home to the northern Indian subcontinent's oldest Christian community known as the Bettiah Christians. It was founded with the focus of "women religious to serve in villages", where most of the population in the Bihar Province of colonial India resided at the time.

The Sisters of the Sacred Heart has established several schools.

In the 1980s, the Sisters of the Sacred Heart shifted from Bettiah to Patna, from where they have been based since that time.

On 30 July 2020, Sister Elsita Mathew, the Superior General of the Sisters of the Sacred Heart died; her funeral was held on 31 July 2020 at Queen of the Apostles’ Church in Patna.
