= Giacomina Lapenna =

Italian journalist

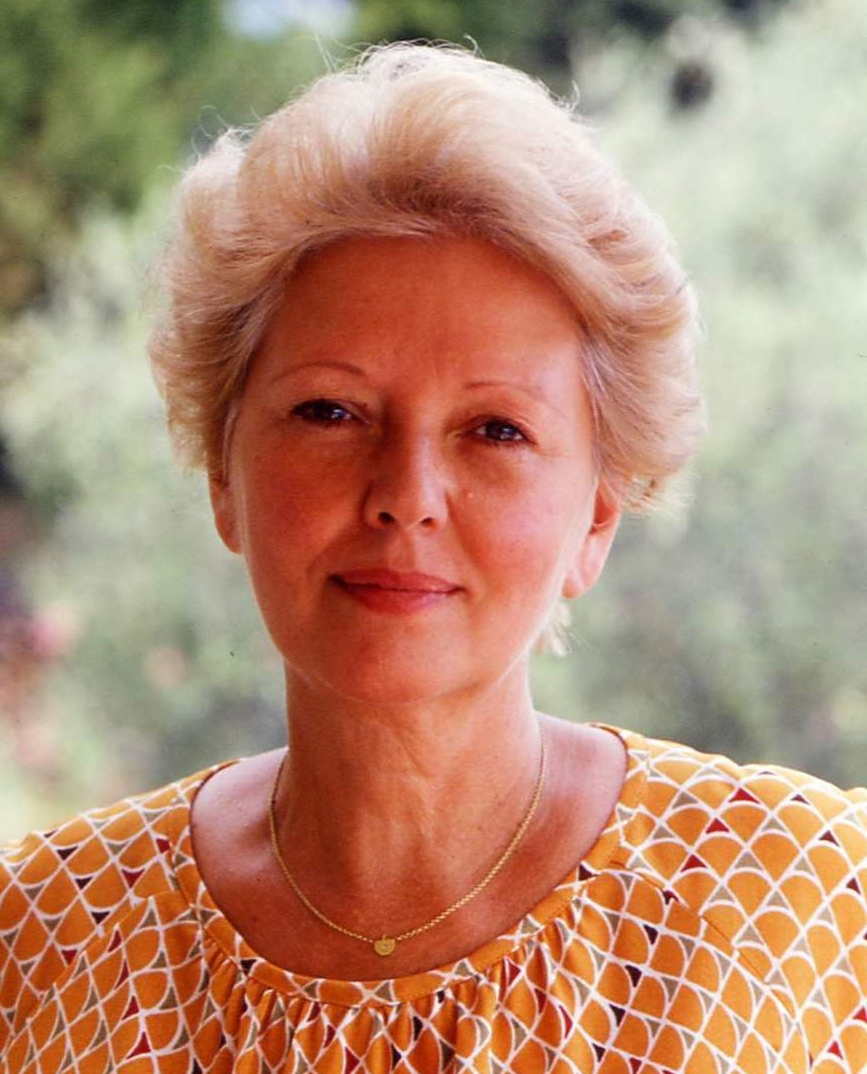
- Giacomina Lapenna in 1978
- Born: December 14, 1924; Trieste, Italy
- Died: September 30, 2013 (aged 88)
- Education: University of Trieste
- Occupations: Entrepreneur; Journalist; media executive; author

Giacomina Lapenna (born Giacomina Lapenna, December 14, 1924 - died September 30, 2013) was an Italian entrepreneur, journalist, teacher, and communication expert. She was the first woman in Italy to work in the field of public relations. In 1958, she co-founded the National Union of Public Relations Experts, Italy. She was also a member of several international public relations organizations and of the European association of women executives.

== Personal life ==
Lapenna, born in Trieste in 1924 to Donato, father and Maddalena Raccamarich, mother. She graduated in modern literature at the University of Trieste. In 1951, on behalf of the University of Trieste, she served as director, the cultural initiatives office, which was the first structure for public relations in an Italian university. In 1954 she founded the Italian language and culture courses for foreigners in Gargnano, an initiative of the University of Milan.

She opened a public relations firm in Milan in 1962. She was co-founder in 1958 of UNERP (National Union of Public Relations Experts), which was later renamed FIRP (Italian Federation of Public Relations) in 1968. Founding member in 1970 in Milan of FERPI (FEderation Italian Public Relations), was vice-president from 1970 to 1973 and board member for over 20 years. From 1975 to 1990 the Persona Project was conceived and implemented, a psychological training program for managers. It was an intensive training course, through individual consultancy or seminars, for the enhancement and improvement in communication of managers, entrepreneurs, freelancers and politicians. Since 1980, she was an advisor and trainer of the Donne in Carriera (Career Women) network, founded by Federica Olivares, later called EWMD (European Women's Management Development) Italy, the association of women managers in Europe. In 1999 she began organizing and carrying out advanced training summer camps in Gargnano, on Lake Garda.

From the first issue (1962) of Amica, the weekly magazine of Corriere della Sera, she edited the column La donna che lavora (The woman who works). As author of the first guide book on professions open to women, with the legal provisions of the time, she won the "Cinque vie" award in 1969, awarded by the mayor of Milan Aldo Aniasi. From 1970 to 1991 she edited the column for scholastic and professional orientation Cosa farò domani (What I'll do tomorrow) in the weekly magazine Famiglia Cristiana. In 1978 she was awarded the prize of the Presidency of the Council of Ministers as author of a guide book on paramedical professions in Italy. She published in 1994, for Lupetti publishing, Come parlare in pubblico con travolgente insuccesso (How to speak in public with overwhelming failure) and in 1998, for the same publisher, Come te non c'è nessuno. Comunicazione d'amore o quasi (There is no one like you. Communication of love or almost). In 2011 she was awarded the gold medal for 50 years of journalistic activity by the Italian Order of Journalists.

Since 1971 she participated, as advisor and consultant to the priest Luigi Maria Verzé, in the foundation of the San Raffaele Hospital in Milan and in the formation of the Fondazione Centro San Raffaele del Monte Tabor, hosting the school centre of the "Taborine", a specialized nursing corps. Beginning in 2005 she was involved, on a voluntary basis, in the training of executives and managers of the non-profit organization SOS Milano. She died in Milan on 30 September 2013. Her last book, Parlare in pubblico e Carisma (Public Speaking and Charisma), remained unpublished.
