= Tomba (given name) =

Tomba (Meitei: ꯇꯣꯝꯕ) is a Meitei ethnic male given name, meaning "little, small, tiny" or "young". Notable people with this given name are:

- Ayekpam Tomba Meetei, Indian social worker
- Haobam Tomba Singh (born 2003), Indian footballer
- Kangabam Tomba (born 1946), Indian actor
- Wangkheirakpam Tomba Singh (born 1982), Indian footballer

== See also ==
- Tombi (given name)
