= Tomba (surname) =

Tomba is a surname from Northern Italy, probably derived from the occupation of a tomb maker, gravedigger or cemetery keeper, or from a nickname for a quiet person. Notable people with the name include:

- Alberto Tomba (born 1966), Italian alpine skier
- Lotario Tomba (1749–1823), Italian architect
- Marco della Tomba (1726–1803), Italian Capuchin friar and missionary
- Maria Tomba (born 2002), Italian singer and songwriter
- Pietro Tomba (1774–1846), Italian painter
