= Bettiah Christians =

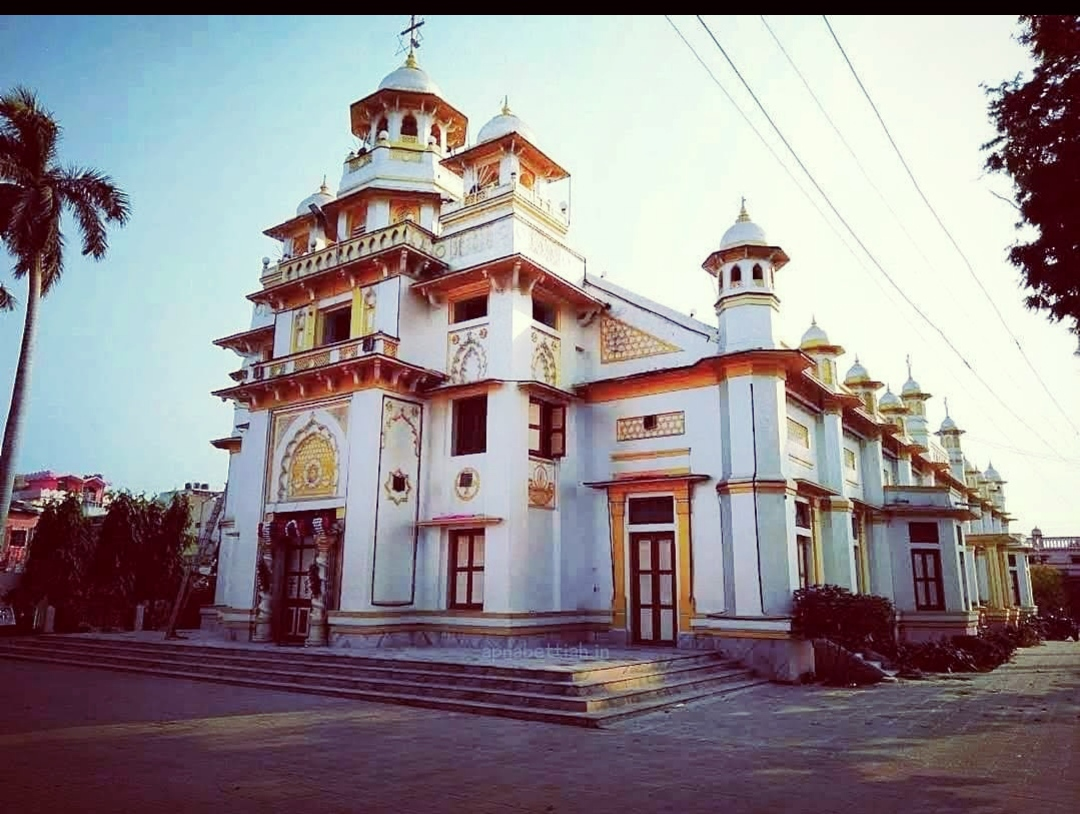
- Roman Catholic Church Bettiah

Total population
- 16,000

Regions with significant populations
- Indian subcontinent

Languages
- Hindi; Urdu; Bhojpuri; English

Religion
- Roman Catholic Christianity

Related ethnic groups
- other Indo-Aryan peoples

The Bettiah Christians (Hindustani/Bhojpuri: Béttiah Masīhī or Béttiah ʿĪsāʾī), also known as Betiawi Christians, are the northern Indian subcontinent's oldest Christian community, which emerged in the 18th century. The origins of the Bettiah Christian community lie in Champaran in what is now the Indian state of Bihar, in which the king of the Bettiah Raj, Maharaja Dhurup Singh, invited Roman Catholic missionaries of the Order of Friars Minor Capuchin to establish the Bettiah Christian Mission there.

Upper and middle-caste Hindus who converted to Christianity in the 18th and 19th centuries constitute the majority of the ethnoreligious community of Bettiah Christians, though it has incorporated those from former Muslim, Newar and scheduled caste heritage as well.

Bettiah Christians are known for working in education, serving in the roles of teachers and professors. A number of them have served in ecclesiastical positions as bishops, nuns, brothers and priests. Their erudite background has led to a Bettiah Christian diaspora across northern India.

== History ==
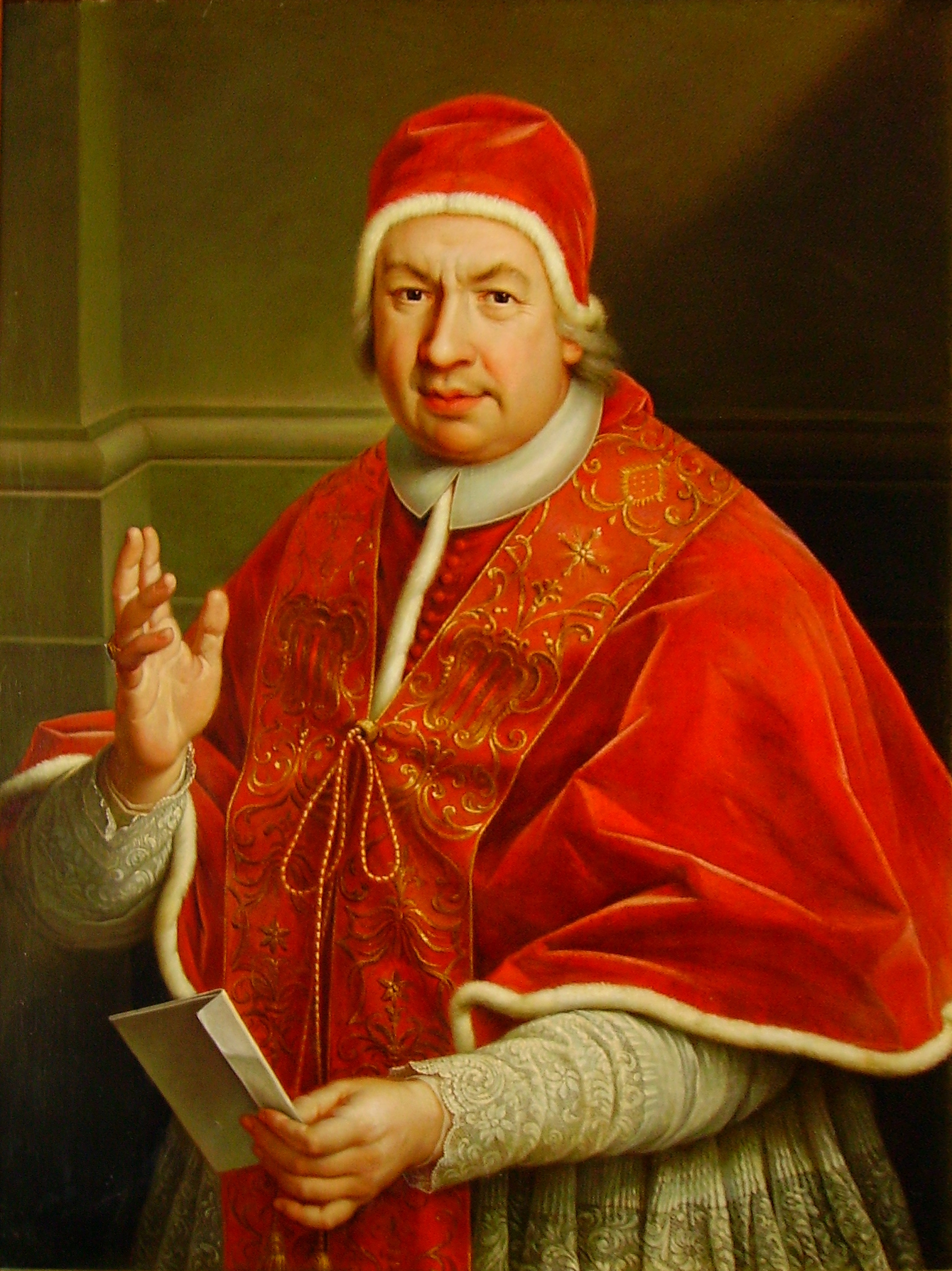
Pope Benedict XIV blessed the Bettiah Christian Mission under the Capuchins in a letter to Maharaja Dhurup Singh dated 1 May 1742.

The Bettiah Raj in India was established by Ugrasen Singh, a Bhumihar ruler who established the state in India in the early 17th century A.D. His son, Gaja Singh, was declared a Raja by the Mughal Indian emperor Shah Jahan.

In 1713, Christian missionaries of the Order of Friars Minor Capuchin established a hospice in Patna, India. Maharaja Dhurup Singh, the ruler of the Bettiah Raj, developed a close friendship with Italian Capuchin missionary priest Joseph Mary Bernini, who practiced medicine and faith healing, as well as being fluent in Hindustani and Sanskrit. The queen of Maharaja Dhurup Singh, was ill and Joseph Mary Bernini came to their Bettiah Palace to pray for her and treat her; the queen was cured of her "incurable illness" and as a result, Singh invited Bernini to found the Bettiah Christian Mission. To secure Bernini's presence at the Bettiah Fort, Maharaja Dhurup Naryan Singh wrote to Pope Benedict XIV asking that priests be sent to Bettiah and on 1 May 1742, Pope Benedict XIV replied stating that the Capuchin priests could remain there and preach the Gospel. Raja Dhurup Singh donated 16 hectares of land, which became known as the Christian Quarters, to the Roman Catholic missionaries of the Capuchin Order.

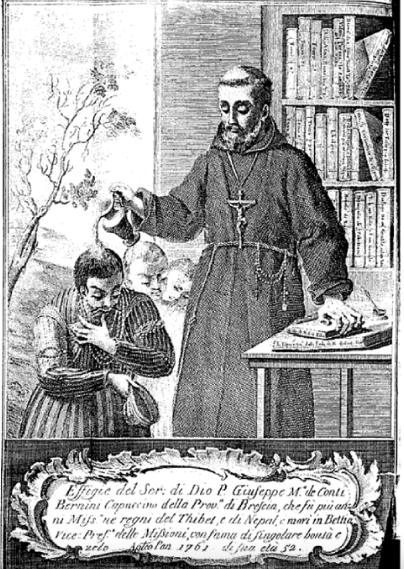
Drawing of Giuseppe Maria Bernini, who played a pivotal role in the foundation of the Bettiah Christian community

In 1749, Joseph Mary Bernini was transferred to Chandannagar to minister to European Christians but he became "sickened at heart with the loose morals of the settlers in the colonial [French] settlement" and wished to be transferred to a location "where there were no Europeans." As such, he returned to his "beloved Bettiah" and Raja Dhurup Singh provided Bernini and his fellow priests the wood to erect a church there. At the dedication of the church in 1751 on Christmas Day, copies of a book describing the friendly relations between Hindus and Christians were brought out, with special copies being printed for the king and other distinguished members of his court. During this event at which most of the citizens of Bettiah were present, Raja Dhurup Singh participated and provided musicians who played outside the church compound.

The German missionary, scientist and geographer Joseph Tiefenthaler wrote in his account on Hindustan that within the walled city of Bettiah, also known as the Bettiah Fort, was a Hindu mandir and the convent of the missionaries of the Franciscan Order.

On 15 January 1761, Joseph Mary Bernini, who had stayed at the Bettiah Christian Mission for the remainder of his life, died and his body was said to produce the odour of sanctity. In the same year, the Bettiah Fort, along with the Bettiah Christian Mission, was attacked by Mir Qasim Ali Khan, the Nawab of Bengal. A fellow Italian Capuchin friar, Marco della Tomba, succeeded Bernini in Bettiah. He also spent much of his time in Bettiah until his death in 1803.

In 1766, Bettiah was attacked by the British under Sir Robert Barker, who damaged the fort and the Catholic church there. The East India Company generally viewed the Italian Capuchins with suspicion and in the 1760s, harassed and imprisoned them for several months; that being said, some individual Englishmen were fond of the Bettiah Christians and financially supported them, and "extended Government help for the care of orphans." Raja Jugal Kishore Singh, the ruler of the Bettiah Raj in India refused to accept British rule in his state, and fought the British with his army though they ended up retreating to Bundelkhand. Following this, the British appointed an estate manager to govern the East India Company. Lacking the local expertise to govern Bettiah, the East India Company invited Raja Jugal Kishore Singh in 1771 to rule the region under the auspices of the East India Company.

The Government of the East India Company honoured Raja Dhurup Singh, in 1786, gave the Bettiah Christian Mission 60 bighas of land within the fort, 200 bighas of land outside the fort, along with the village of Chuhari. At that time, there were three Catholic churches in each of these places, with 2500 Christians residing in Bettiah itself, along with 700 Christians residing in Chuhari and 400 Christians residing in Dossaiya.

During the Indian Rebellion of 1857, the Maharaja of Bettiah sided with the British government and in 1909 through the Court of Wards, the Bettiah Raj came under the control of the British Raj in India.

== Traditional occupations ==
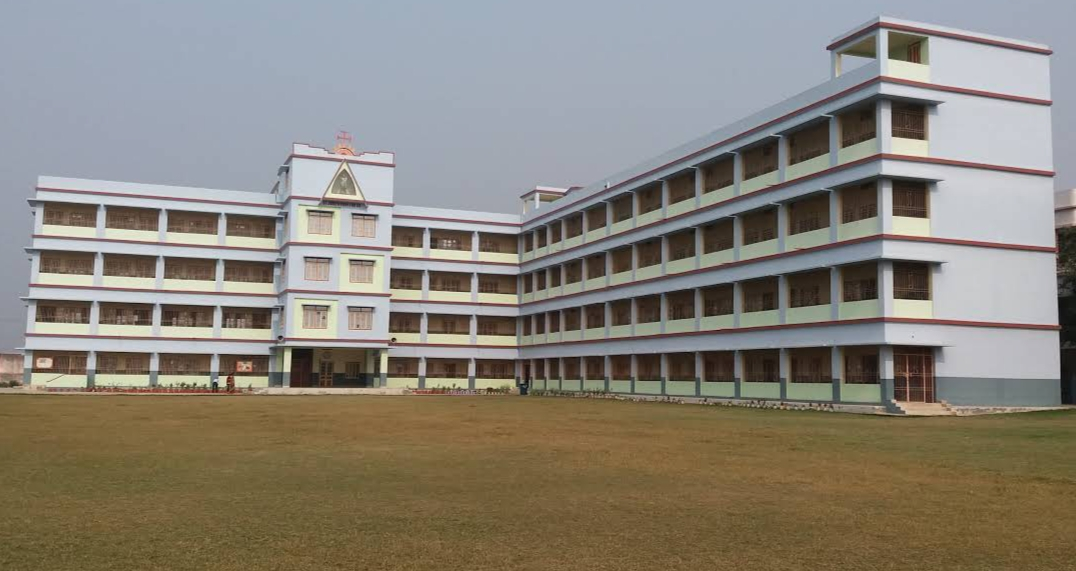
St. Joseph's School in Bettiah is a Catholic school served by the Bettiah Christian community.

At the time of their conversion to Christianity, the Bettiah Christians were largely scholars, cultivators and farmers, as well as artisans involved in carpentry, gold smithery, masonry, and blacksmithy. The Brahmins, however, gave up their priestly work.

The majority of Bettiah Christians became involved in the education sector, serving as teachers and professors. Among the first schools opened by the Bettiah Christian Mission included St. Stanislaus Mission Middle English School in 1860, along with St. Aloysius Pathsala and Jubilee Memorial Nursery School; these have produced hundreds of graduates. Khrist Raja High School, established in 1922, has been widely attended by members of the Bettiah Christian Indian community too. Female education was a priority of the Bettiah Christian Mission, with St. Teresa's Mission Middle English School being founded in 1922, along with St. Teresa's Teacher Training College in 1928. As of 1995, there are twenty-seven schools in Bettiah managed by the Bettiah Christian community. While the literacy rate of Bettiah in general was 52.8% in 1991, among the Bettiah Christian community, it stood at 70.09%.

== Clothing ==
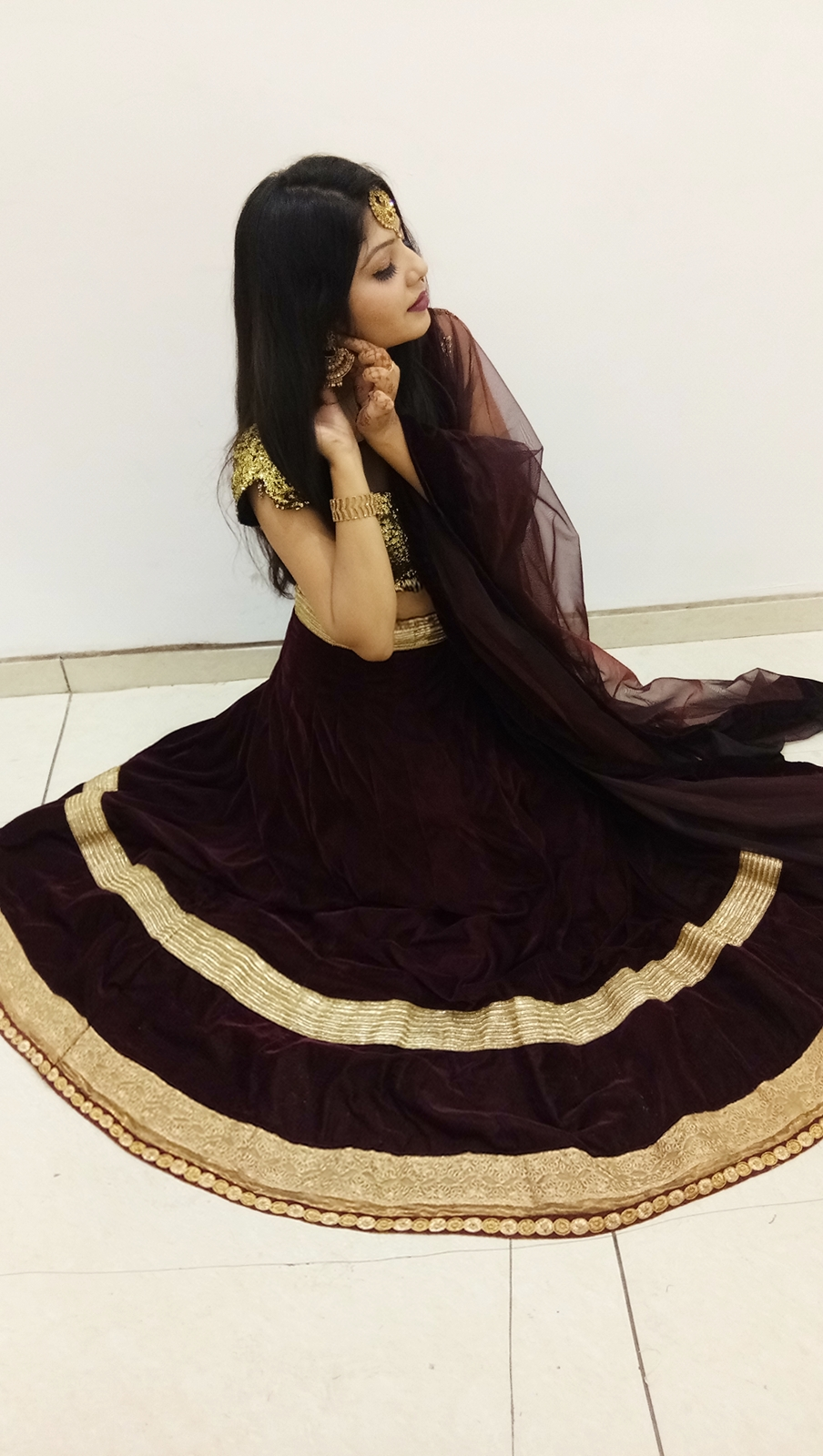
The lehenga was the traditional dress worn by Bettiah Christian women.

The lehenga, a garment worn by women in northwestern India, was the traditional dress worn by Bettiah Christian women. Since the 1950s, Bettiah Christian women are indistinguishable in dress from their neighbours, wearing the saree and shalwar qameez.

During weddings, men usually do wear Western-style suits.

== Castes ==
Being principally descendants of Brahmins, they hold a fair social position, ... [though] one-fourth are carpenters, one-tenth blacksmiths, one-tenth servants, the remainder are carters.

— William Wilson Hunter (1872)

The majority of Bettiah Christians were upper and middle caste converts from Hinduism and Islam; they are composed of individuals with the following castes:

- Brahmin
- Bhumihar
- Rajput
- Kayasth
- Bania
- Lohar
- Hazam
- Mahto
- Koeri
- Kumhar
- Raut

A community of originally two hundred Newar Christians settled in the Bihari village of Chuhari after fleeing persecution and over time, some members of this community have intermarried with the Bettiah Christians.

In the Christian Quarters of Bettiah, historically, sonars (goldsmiths) resided in Sonar Patt, lohars (blacksmiths) resided in Lohar Patt, Kayasths (accountants) resided in Kayasth Patt, barhais (carpenters) resided in Barhai Patt, etc. In 1790, the Bettiah Christians in a historic caste panchayat voted to abolish "caste jati norms for marriage and dining." Due to their patronage by the Bettiah Rajas and the zamindari position of the Bettiah Christian Mission authorities, the Bettiah Christian converts mixed freely with Hindus and Muslims, "without any discrimination". Due to the "inter-community marriages and participation in shared community activities such as life-cycle rituals, festivals, ceremonies, [and] social functions", the Bettiah Christians "oriented to the ideal of a casteless community". Today, the Bettiah Christians stress a "brotherhood in religion" over caste, forming amicable relationships with Christians of other communities, including Dalit Christians.

== Marriage ==
With regard to marriage, the Bettiah Christians are generally strict.

During weddings, at the conclusion of the Nuptial Mass, the groom applies sindoor to the parting in his bride's hair.

== Ecclesiastical life ==
The first Roman Catholic priest from the Bettiah Christian community was ordained in 1861. As of 1995, two bishops of the Catholic Church from the Bettiah Christian community have been ordained.

The Sisters of the Sacred Heart was founded in Bettiah in 1926, with the religious order focusing on service in villages; it has established several schools.

== Interfaith relations ==
The tradition of communal harmony between the Bettiah Christians and other religious communities has been maintained since the dedication of the first Catholic church in Bettiah:

After the blessing of the new church at night, the Christian pooja (Mass) was repeated in the morning when more people came to attend the church service, including the nephew of the Raja and his retinue. The attendance of the Raja's court along with the Hindus, seems to be the beginning of a beautiful practice in religious harmony and dialogue still in vogue at Bettiah church. Every year at Christmas and on Good Friday, hundreds of non-Christians, particularly Hindus, largely in family groups, visit the church and offer prayers both inside it and at the shrine of Mother Mary, outside.

Since their inception, the Bettiah Christians have maintained a spirit of communal harmony with Hindus and Muslims. Adherents of other faiths often visit the churches of the Bettiah Christians and pray there, especially at the grotto containing a statue of Mother Mary.

== Bettiah Christian diaspora ==
Educational opportunities fueled the migration of some Bettiah Christians to other urban centres of northern colonial India. The Cornelius family was among the first Bettiah Christian migrants to the city of Kanpur. Some Bettiah Christians are now settled abroad in the United Kingdom, United States, Australia and Canada.

== See also ==
- Punjabi Christians
