= Tombi (given name) =

Tombi (Meitei: ꯇꯣꯝꯕꯤ) is a Meitei ethnic unisex given name, meaning "little, small, tiny" or "young". Notable people with this given name are:

- Khumujam Tombi Devi (born 1982), Indian judoka
- N. Tombi Singh (1927–2001), Indian politician
- Tombi Bell (born 1979), U.S. Virgin Islands basketball player

== See also ==
- Tomba (given name)
