= Captain Tomba =

African slave

Captain Tomba was an African ruler who was sold into slavery during the Middle Passage of the 18th century.

== History ==
Tomba refused to work with European slave traders and began harassing the locals who did so. He was captured by John Leadstine, the European in control of a factory at Sierra Leone and sold to Captain Richard Harding aboard the slave ship Robert in the year 1721.

Captain Tomba tried to escape from Robert; during the insurrection Tomba killed two sailors but was recaptured. Harding decided to spare Tomba's life because Tomba was valuable, but instead he took the life of three other enslaved people. The first Harding murdered instantly, then he made the other two eat the heart and liver of this man. A woman "he hoisted up by the Thumbs, whipp'd, and slashed her with Knives, before the other Slaves till she died".

Captain Tomba survived the trip across the Atlantic Ocean and was sold in Kingston, Jamaica, along with 189 people.

== Sources ==
- Rediker, Marcus (2007). The Slave Ship: A Human History. U.K.: Viking. ISBN 978-0670018239.
