= Tomba Singh =

Tomba Singh may refer to:

- Tomba Singh Haobam (born 2003), Indian footballer
- Tomba Singh Wangkheirakpam (born 1982), Indian footballer
