= Gargnano =

Gargnano Gargnà
- Comune
- Comune di Gargnano

- Coat of arms

- Location within Italy Location within Lombardy
- Coordinates: 45°41′20″N 10°39′50″E
- Country: Italy
- Region: Lombardy
- Province: Brescia (BS)
- Frazioni: Bogliaco, Costa, Fornico, Formaga, Liano, Musaga, Muslone, Navazzo, Sasso, Villa, Villavetro, Zuino

Government
  - Mayor: Giovanni Albini

Area
  - Total: 78 km^{2} (30 sq mi)
- Elevation: 98 m (322 ft)

Population (31 December 2011)
  - Total: 3,033
  - Density: 39/km^{2} (100/sq mi)
- Demonym: Gargnanesi
- Time zone: UTC+1 (CET)
  - Summer (DST): UTC+2 (CEST)
- Postal code: 25084
- Dialing code: 0365
- Website: Official website

Gargnano (Gardesano: Gargnà) is a town and comune (municipality) in the province of Brescia, in Lombardy, Italy. It is situated on the western shore of Lake Garda. The municipal territory includes the artificial Valvestino Lake, created in 1962.

== History ==
The name of the village appears for the first time in a document of 937 as Garniano, perhaps derived from the Latin stem Garenius. Passages of the Roman historian Titus Livius and inscriptions on headstones testify to the presence of Etruscans, Celts, Cenomani and Romans.

From 1350 to 1426 the territory of Gargnano was a dominion of the Visconti of Milan, later a dominion of the Republic of Venice.

In 1866 Gargnano was bombarded by the Austrian navy during the fighting on Lake Garda which formed part of the Third Italian War of Independence.

== Notable residents ==
- Giovanni Beatrice, called Zanzanù, and Eliseo Baruffaldo, brigands of the 17th century
- Pietro Bellotto, Baroque painter
- Lorenzo Fiorini, Domenico Pattuccelli and Tommaso Chiaromonte, volunteers in the southern army of Giuseppe Garibaldi during the military campaign of 1860
- Alexander Bettoni Cazzago, soldier, partisan and horseman. Won the Siena Square dressage competition in 1942. As colonel of the Third Regiment of the Savoy Cavalry in 1942 he led charges in the Russian campaign that are among the last uses of cavalry in modern warfare.
- Erika Blanc, actress
- Cesare Lievi, theatre director, poet and dramatist
- Benito Mussolini, during the Italian Social Republic (the Republic of Saló) lived in the Villa delle Orsoline (Villa Feltrinelli)
- D. H. Lawrence, novelist lived in Gargnano from 18 September 1912 to 30 March 1913 with Frieda Weekley von Richthofen
- Uto Ughi, violinist
- Oscar Ghiglia, guitarist
- Giuseppe Maria Bernini, Capuchin friar and missionary
