= Marco della Tomba =

Italian friar (1726–1803)

Marco della Tomba, O.F.M. Cap. (1726–1803) was an Italian Capuchin friar, who served as a missionary in North India, then called by its Persian name of Hindustan. He was a part of the Mission to Tibet financed by the Sacred Congregation of Propaganda Fide, which still supervises the missionary activity of the Catholic Church throughout the world.

Friar Marco appears to have lived and worked in Tibet, Nepal, and northern India, viz., Bihar and Bengal. He is credited for writing several essays and letters describing his experiences of Indian society and customs for the benefit of future missionaries, notably in two autobiographical essays: Diversi sistemi della religione dell'Indostano and Osservazioni sopra le relazioni che fa Monsieur Holwell Ingles; several translations of Indian religious texts from Hindi to Italian; and 55 pieces of correspondence between himself and Cardinal Stefano Borgia, Secretary of the Congregation of Propaganda Fide.

This friar was literally unknown or unheard of until his life and works were described by journals and articles published by Cambridge University Press and others, based on a research project in 1998 by David Lorenzen, an author who used Marco's surviving letters in the Vatican Library and the Vatican Secret Archives of the Propaganda Fide to write a personal and intellectual biography of him from Marco's own view. Lorenzen used the texts of Marco's surviving letters and essayswith material from various works to fill in the gaps. He thus wrote the friar's life, attributing to Marco words that he never wrote or spoke, in order to "construct" a "historical text".

== Life ==
He was born Pietro Girolamo Agresti in 1726 to Crisostomo Agresti and Vittoria Luzietti in the village of Tomba, near the town of Senigallia, then part of the province of Urbino in the Papal States, now in the Province of Ancona. There existed a Capuchin friary in his town, and he was clearly inspired by the lives of the friars to enter their Order. He was received into the novitiate of the Capuchin friars in Camerino on 25 April 1745 and given his religious name of Marco. He professed solemn vows as a member of the Order one year later. Volunteering for the foreign missions, he was sent to serve the Tibet Mission which had been entrusted to the members of his Capuchin ecclesiastical province by the Propaganda Fide. After departing Italy, Marco arrived in Chandernagore in the region of Bengal on 8 October 1757.

What Marco found was a small Capuchin community struggling to cope with the devastation caused by the conquest of the French fort by British forces. At the order of the head of the prelature, he left for Bihar on 29 January of the following year, where he took up the post of military chaplain for the French forces commanded by Jean Law in Bettiah. Marco spent much of his time in Patna, Chuhari, and in the mission station in Bettiah - near the Nepal border and more or less, directly south of Kathmandu. During this time, he recorded and commented on the number of events of the late eighteenth century as essays, letters, and translations, including religious texts, beliefs, and practices in India. He was ordered by his superiors to return to Italy in 1773, where he remained until 1783. During this time he made a number of requests either to be sent back to India or to Brazil, as he knew Portuguese.

Marco was sent back to India in 1783 and lived mostly in Bettiah, Patna, Chandernagore, and Bhagalpur. He died in Bhagalpur on 13 March (or 7 June) 1803 at an age of 77.

== Writings ==
During his stay in Northern India, Marco wrote a great number of essays and letters, which still survive in the Vatican library and the archives of the Propaganda Fide. Marco nowhere mentioned the overview of the mission and his own life. Based on the archives of the Capuchin Order, by the time he arrived in Chandernagore on 8 October 1757, the English had transported most of the French men to outside the city, after a war between French and English in March of that year; a large number of English workers were employed to demolish the fort and factories belonging to the French company. His accounts also describe several historical events such as a plague in the city of Chandernagore after its conquest by the British; his departure to Bettiah and Patna; accounts such as English were in war against the people of the country, both Hindu and Muslim; and the banishment of the Jesuits from Chandernagore.

In 1766 Marco wrote an essay in Italian entitled Diversi sistemi della religione dell'Indostano referring to the people of the country as Gentili, but never using the term "Hindu"; instead, he contrasts their religion with that of both the Christians and Muslims. He divides the "diverse tribes of men" as that are believed to originate from the body of Brahma—the tribes of Brahmins and cows; the Vaishnavas (Bisnuas); the Ramanandis; the Saivas; the Smartas ( Asmaetr) of Sankaracarya, the Nastikas or atheists, the Pasandas or hedonists(according to Marco), and the Saktas. He further subdivides religious practitioners of these sects or groups, according to their style of observance into Yogis, Vanaprasthas, Sannyasis, Nagas, Vairagis, and Avadhutas. Marco distinguishes the Kabir Panthis (Cabiristi) and the Sikhs (Nanekpanti) as two groups somewhat separate from other eight groups. In his discussion of the Sikhs, he tried to show that Sikhs had staked out a religious position combining elements of both the Hindu and Muslim faiths, based on a Hindi phrase:

Nanak fakir, Hindu ka guru, Musalaman ka pir.

In 1771 he wrote an essay in Italian language entitled Piccola descrizione dell'India orientale, o Industan (A short description of East India, or Hindustan) in which he described his Indian experiences for the benefit of future missionaries.

After Marco returned to Italy in 1773, sometime between 1774 and 1783, he edited some of his earlier essays to refine them, and wrote an essay Osservazioni sopra le relazioni che fa Monsieur Holwell Ingles (Observations on the Accounts of the English Lord Holwell) and a long polemical essay against Holwell's views on Hinduism. During his stay in Italy, he also drew up a plan for the future of the Tibet mission, which had already been expelled from Tibet in 1745. No writings by him are known from after his return to India.

== Legacy ==
In general, Marco's essays, letters, and translations of Indian religious texts into Italian appears in his accounts of his experiences and explorations in India. Among them is the translation of a part of Tulsidas's Ram-carit-manas (Ramcharitmanas) and an essay entitled Libri Indiani(Indian Books), which contain the discussions of the four Vedas, eighteen Puranas, different philosophical darsanas, more in line with the standard model of Hinduism.
