= Giuseppe Maria Bernini =

Italian Capuchin missionary, physician and Orientalist

Giuseppe Maria Bernini da Garghano OFMCap
- Vice-prefect of the Tibet-Hindustan Mission
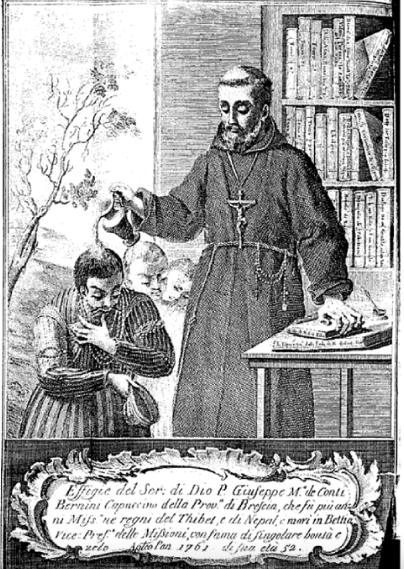
- Drawing of Giuseppe Maria Bernini De Gargnano from the 1767 book Memorie Historiche by Cassiano de Macerata
- Church: Roman Catholic Church

Personal details
- Born: Bernardino Bernini; 2 September 1709
- Died: 15 January 1761
- Denomination: Roman Catholic
- Residence: India

Ordination history of Giuseppe Maria Bernini
History
Priestly ordination
- Ordained by: ?

Giuseppe Maria Bernini, also known as Giuseppe Maria da Gargnano (English: Joseph Mary Bernini, Hindustani: ज्यूसेपे मारिया बेर्निनी (Devanagari), جیوسپی ماریا بیرنینی (Nastaleeq)), who lived from 1709–1761, was an Italian Capuchin missionary, physician and Orientalist. His efforts led to the establishment of the northern Indian subcontinent's oldest Christian community—the Bettiah Christians. Bernini was the first European to author tracts in Hindustani (Hindi-Urdu), as well as to translate Indian classics from Sanskrit into Italian.

== Life ==
Bernini was born at Gargnano in Lombardy on 2 September 1709. He met Horatio della Penna of the Tibetan Mission in Rome, and himself travelled to Lhasa. He acquired a knowledge of the languages and dialects of India, being fluent in Hindustani and Sanskrit, as well as in Latin, French, German and Italian. Bernini's skills as a medical doctor were known throughout northern India, Tibet and Nepal, though he also practiced faith healing.

In 1713, Christian missionaries of the Roman Catholic Order of Friars Minor Capuchin established a hospice in Patna, India. Maharaja Dhurup Singh, the ruler of the Bettiah Raj in India, developed a close friendship with Giuseppe Maria Bernini. The queen of Maharaja Dhurup Singh, was ill and Bernini came to their Bettiah Palace to pray for her and treat her; the queen was healed of her illness that was said to be incurable, and as a result, Singh invited Bernini to found the Bettiah Christian Mission. To secure Bernini's presence at the Bettiah Fort, Maharaja Dhurup Naryan Singh wrote to Pope Benedict XIV asking that priests be sent to Bettiah and on 1 May 1742, Pope Benedict XIV replied stating that the Capuchin priests could remain there and preach the Gospel.

In 1749, Joseph Mary Bernini was transferred to Chandannagar to minister to European Christians but he became "sickened at heart with the loose morals of the settlers in the colonial [French] settlement" and wished to be transferred to a location "where there were no Europeans." As such, he returned to his "beloved Bettiah" and Raja Dhurup Singh provided Bernini and his fellow priests the wood to erect a Catholic church there.

Joseph Mary Bernini spent his life establishing what would become the northern Indian subcontinent's oldest extant Christian community—the Bettiah Christians. When he died on 15 January 1761, his body was said to produce the odour of sanctity.

== Works ==
In his travels through the country he made a study of the manners, languages, customs, and religious beliefs and practices of the people. The results of his studies were collected in his work: "Notizie laconiche di alcuni usi, sacrifizi, ed idoli nel regno di Neipal, raccolte nel anno 1747". This work has never been published, but was preserved in manuscript in the library of the Propaganda at Rome, and in the museum of Cardinal Borgia. Bernini also wrote "Dialogues", in one of the Indian languages, also preserved in manuscript in the Propaganda; a translation of "Adhiatma Ramayana"; one of "Djana Sagara", and a collection of historical studies under the title, "Mémoires historiques" (Verona).

Bernini authored a Hindustani-Italian dictionary, which Joseph da Rovato declared was "perfect in every respect".
