= Bettiah Raj =

Zamindari estate in Bihar, India

- 16th century–1952
- Capital: Bettiah
- Religion: Hinduism
- Historical era: India under the Mughal Empire
  - Established: 16th century
  - Disestablished: 1952

Area
  - Total: 4,724 km^{2} (1,824 sq mi)

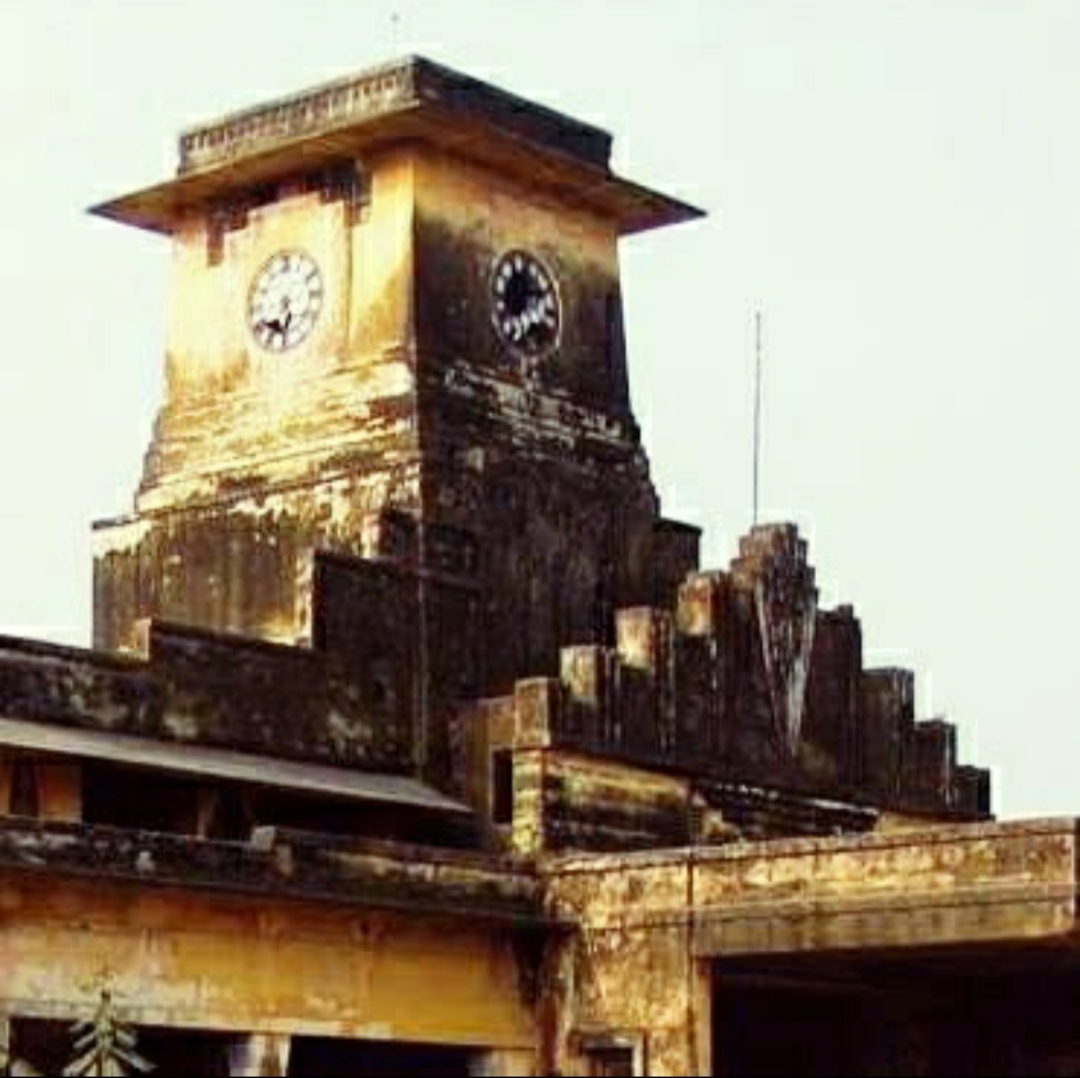
Buildings in the Bettiah Raj, including the old gate, mandir, and Bettiah Raj Mahal (top), with a focus on the Ghanta Ghar of the Bettiah Raj Mahal (bottom)

The Bettiah Raj was a chieftaincy in the Mughal province of Bihar. The area of the Bettiah Raj was about 2000 sq. miles and it generated an annual land revenue of more than 2 million rupees.

Part of a series on the
History of Bihar
Ancient History
Prehistoric and Vedic Era

- Chirand (Neolithic) - Vedic period - Videha - Mithila (ancient) - Anga - Kikata

Urbanisation and Shramana

- Second Urbanisation - Rise of Shramana - Buddhism • Jainism • Ajivika

Gaṇasaṅghas

- Magadha - Vajjika League

  - Nāya
  - Vajji (tribe)
  - Licchavis of Vaishali

- Malla (tribe) - Kashi - Bulis

Imperial Magadha

- Brihadratha dynasty - Haryanka dynasty

  - Bimbisara
  - Ajatashatru

- Shishunaga dynasty - Nanda Empire

  - Mahapadma Nanda

- Maurya Empire

  - Chandragupta Maurya
  - Ashoka
Post-Mauryan and Smriti

- Shunga Empire

  - Pushyamitra Shunga

- Kanva dynasty - Development of Smriti - Brahmanical Revival

The Interregnum

- Kushan Influence - Mitra Dynasty - Resurgence of Licchavis

Classical and medieval
The Classical Age

- Gupta Empire

Early Medieval

- Later Gupta dynasty - Maukharis

Pala Era and Feudatories

- Pala Empire - Khayaravala dynasty - Pithipatis of Magadha

Medieval Mithila

- Karnats of Mithila - Oiniwar dynasty

Islamic Incursions

- Delhi Sultanate

Centers of Learning

- Nalanda - Vikramashila - Odantapuri - Telhara monastery

Early-modern
Afghan and Mughal Rule

- Sur Empire

  - Sher Shah Suri

- Mughal Empire

  - Bihar Subah
Regional Chieftaincies

- Chakwars - Chero dynasty - Gidhaur chieftaincy - Kharagpur Raj - Khokhra chieftaincy

Major Zamindari Estates

- Bettiah Raj - Khandavala dynasty - Dumraon Raj - Hathwa Raj - Jagdishpur estate

Colonial & Independence Era
Colonial Rule (1764–1947)

- Battle of Buxar (1764) - East India Company - Permanent Settlement (1793) - Santhal rebellion - Indian Rebellion of 1857

  - Kunwar Singh

- Bihar famine of 1873–74 - Bihar Province (Est. 1912) - 1934 Nepal–Bihar earthquake

Freedom Struggle

- Champaran Satyagraha (1917) - Salt Satyagraha - Bihar Vidyapeeth - Kisan Sabha

  - Swami Sahajanand Saraswati

- Quit India Movement

  - Azad Dasta
Modern Era (Post-1947)
Congress Era (1947–1967)

- Sri Krishna Sinha - Anugrah Narayan Sinha - Zamindari Abolition

Socialist and JP Era (1967–1989)

- Karpoori Thakur - Bihar Movement (1974) - Jayaprakash Narayan - Bhagalpur riots (1989)

RJD Era (1990–2005)

- Lalu Prasad Yadav - Rabri Devi - Fodder Scam

State Division (2000)

- Bihar Reorganisation Act, 2000 - Creation of Jharkhand

NDA Era (2005–Present)

- Nitish Kumar - Politics of Bihar

Culture, art, and society
Art and architecture

- Mahabodhi Temple - Nalanda - Barabar Caves - Tomb of Sher Shah Suri - Rohtas Fort - Golghar - Mithila Painting - Patna Qalam - Manjusha Art - Didarganj Yakshi

Society and language

- Bihari culture - Mithila • Magadh • Anga - Bihari languages

  - Maithili • Magahi
  - Bhojpuri • Angika
Religion

- Religion in Bihar - Buddhism in Bihar - Jainism in Bihar - Islam in Bihar - Sikhism in Bihar

Portal India Portal Bihar

Its territory was mainly situated within the sarkar of Champaran and consisted of the mahals of Samru, Mehsi and Majhora.In 1244 A.D., Gangeshwar Dev, a Brahmin of the Jaitharia clan, Now known as Bhumihar Brahmin. settled at Jaithar in Champaran

== History ==
=== Origins ===
Bettiah was one of many chieftaincies that emerged after the collapse of the Oiniwar dynasty of Mithila in the 16th century. The chiefs of Bettiah traced their origins to the Oinwars.

=== Pre-colonial era ===
The chieftaincy first finds reference in the Baburnama when Babur mentions that the region of Champaran was independent and estimates its revenue to be 1,90,86,060 tankas. However it would not be until the reign of Emperor Akbar that Bettiah had its first contact with the Mughals when the current chieftain, Udai Karan, offered his submission to the governor of Bihar, Muzaffar Khan Turbati and assisted him against the Afghan rebels in Hajipur. In 1576, Udai Karan again provided assistance to Turbati when a revolt was started by the Afghans of Chota Nagpur. Udai Karan was able to provide assistance into the topography of the region. Udai Karan also engaged in a conflict with the neighbouring chiefs of Raj Darbhanga. The Raja of Darbhanga, Mahesh Thakur, laid claim over territories falling within the Bettiah Raj and this was followed by multiple skirmishes between their respective retainers.

During the reign of Emperor Shah Jahan, the chieftain of Bettiah, Jay Singh, was granted the title of Raja by the Emperor although the sources do not provide any information as to the reason why. After Raja Jay Singh's death in 1694, his chieftaincy was divided up among his three sons with the eldest, Dalip being given Bettiah while the other two sons received smaller parganas. Dalip Singh ruled the chieftaincy till 1715 when he died and was thereafter succeeded by his son, Raja Dhrup Singh, who held Bettiah till 1763. During the reign of Emperor Aurangzeb the hostilities between Bettiah and Darbhanga restarted when Raja Gaj Singh built a fort in Bettiah which Mahinath Thakur considered to be an act of war. Darbhanga laid siege to Bettiah and the fort was eventually captured. Disputes between the two chieftaincies continued following the death of Aurangzeb and into the reign of Alivardi.

=== East India Company ===
In 1765, when the East India Company acquired the Diwani, Bettiah Raj held the largest territory under its jurisdiction. It consisted of a portion of the territory of Champaran. Bettiah Raj also came into being as a result of mallikana chaudharai and quanungoi, the connection with the revenue administration building on local dominance, and their ability to control and protect hundreds of villages. Internal disputes and family quarrels divided the Raj as time moved forward. Madhuban Raj was created as a consequence of such.

During the Bettiah Raj of Bihar, the ethnoreligious community of Bettiah Christians, largely descended from upper-caste and middle-caste Hindu and Muslim converts to Christianity, was established in India by missionaries belonging to the Order of Friars Minor Capuchin, a Roman Catholic religious order. It is one of the northern Indian subcontinent's oldest Christian communities. The mission was founded after Raja Dhurup Singh requested Joseph Mary Bernini to heal his ill wife of a severe illness and was said to be successful in doing so. The Bettiah Christian Mission flourished under the blessing of Pope Benedict XIV and the patronage of the royal court of the Rajas, growing in number.

=== British Raj era ===
The last zamindar was Maharaja Harendra Kishore Singh, who was born in 1854 and succeeded his father, Maharaja Rajendra Kishore Singh Bahadur, in 1883. In 1884, he received the title of Maharaja Bahadur as a personal distinction and a Khilat and a sanad from the Lieutenant Governor of Bengal, Sir Augustus Rivers Thompson. He was created a Knight Commander of the Most Eminent Order of the Indian Empire on 1 March 1889. He was appointed a member of the Legislative Council of Bengal in January 1891. He was also a member of The Asiatic Society. He was the last ruler of Bettiah Raj.

Maharaja Sir Harendra Kishore Singh Bahadur died heirless on 26 March 1893 leaving behind two widows, Maharani Sheo Ratna Kunwar and Maharani Janki Kunwar. Maharani Sheo Ratna Kunwar who succeeded to the estate of Maharaja Harendra Kishore Singh on his death as his senior widow died on 24 March 1896 and on her death Maharani Janki Kunwar became entitled to the possession of the estate. Since it was found that Maharani Janki Kunwar was not able to administer the estate, its management was taken over by the Court of Wards, Bihar in 1897. Maharani Janki Kunwar who was a limited holder of the estate died on 27 November 1954.

The Bettiah Raj forests were managed for timber production. Bihar state government took over management of the Bettiah Raj forests in 1953 and 1954 under the Bihar Private Protected Forests Act (1947). Valmiki National Park and Wildlife Sanctuary include a portion of the former Bettiah Raj estate.

== Rulers ==
1. Raja Ugrasen Singh (1620-1659)
2. Raja Gaj Singh (1659-1694)
3. Raja Dalip Singh (1694-1715)
4. Raja Dhrub Singh (1715-1762)
5. Raja Jugul Kishore Singh (1762-1783)
6. Raja Bir Kishore Singh (1783-1816)
7. Maharaja Ananda Kishore Singh (1816-1838)
8. Maharaja Nawal Kishore Singh (1838-1855)
9. Maharaja Rajendra Kishore Singh (1855-1883)
10. Maharaja Harendra Kishore Singh (1883-1893)
11. Maharani Sheo Ratna Kuer (1893-1896)
12. Maharani Janki Kuer (1896-1897)

== See also ==
- Zamindars of Bihar
