= Bettiah =

- City
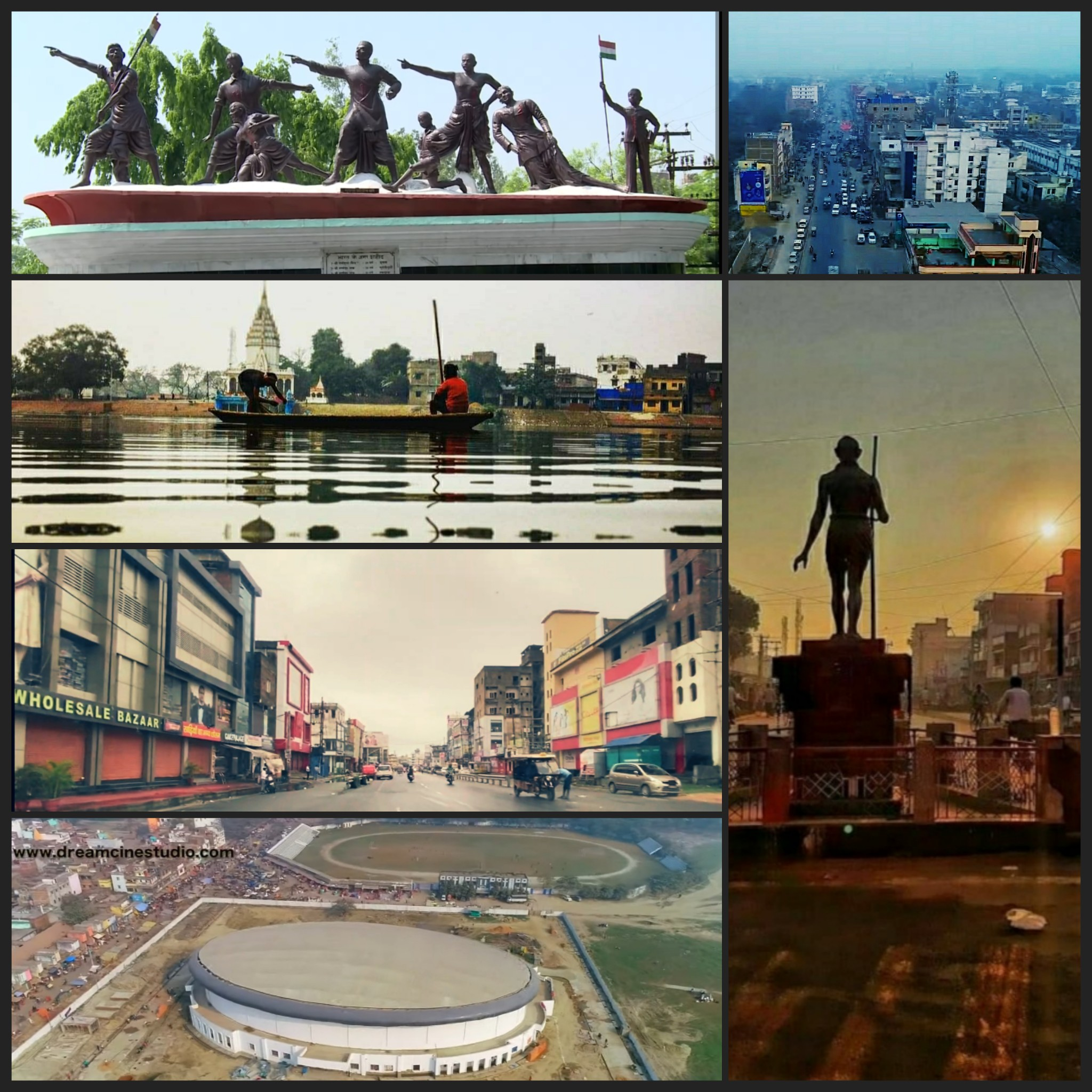
- Anticlockwise from top left -Bettiah Raj mahal Saheed Park, Sagar pokhra and Shiv Mandir, Supriya Cinema road, Bettiah auditorium and Maharaja Stadium, Gandhi statue at Hariwatika Chowk, Aeria view of Station chowk.

- Location in Bihar, India
- Coordinates: 26°48′05″N 84°30′10″E
- Country: India
- State: Bihar
- District: West Champaran
- Established: 1244 AD
- Founder: Gangeshwar Dev

Government
  - Type: Mayor-council
  - Body: Bettiah Municipal corporation

Area
  - City: 30 km^{2} (12 sq mi)
  - Urban: 64 km^{2} (25 sq mi)
- Elevation: 65 m (213 ft)

Population (2020)as estimated
  - Rank: 14th(as in 2011)in Bihar
  - Urban: 414,453

Language
  - Official: Hindi
  - Additional official: Urdu
  - Regional: Bhojpuri
- Time zone: UTC+5:30 (IST)
- PIN: 845438
- BTH: 06254
- ISO 3166 code: IN-BR
- Vehicle registration: BR-22
- Sex ratio: 53% male : 47% female ♂/♀
- Lok Sabha constituency: Paschim Champaran/was before Bettiah
- Vidhan Sabha constituency: Bettiah
- Website: westchamparan.bih.nic.in

Bettiah is a city and the administrative headquarters of West Champaran district (Tirhut Division) in the Indian state of Bihar. It is near the Indo-Nepal border, 225 kilometres (140 mi) northwest of Patna.

== History ==
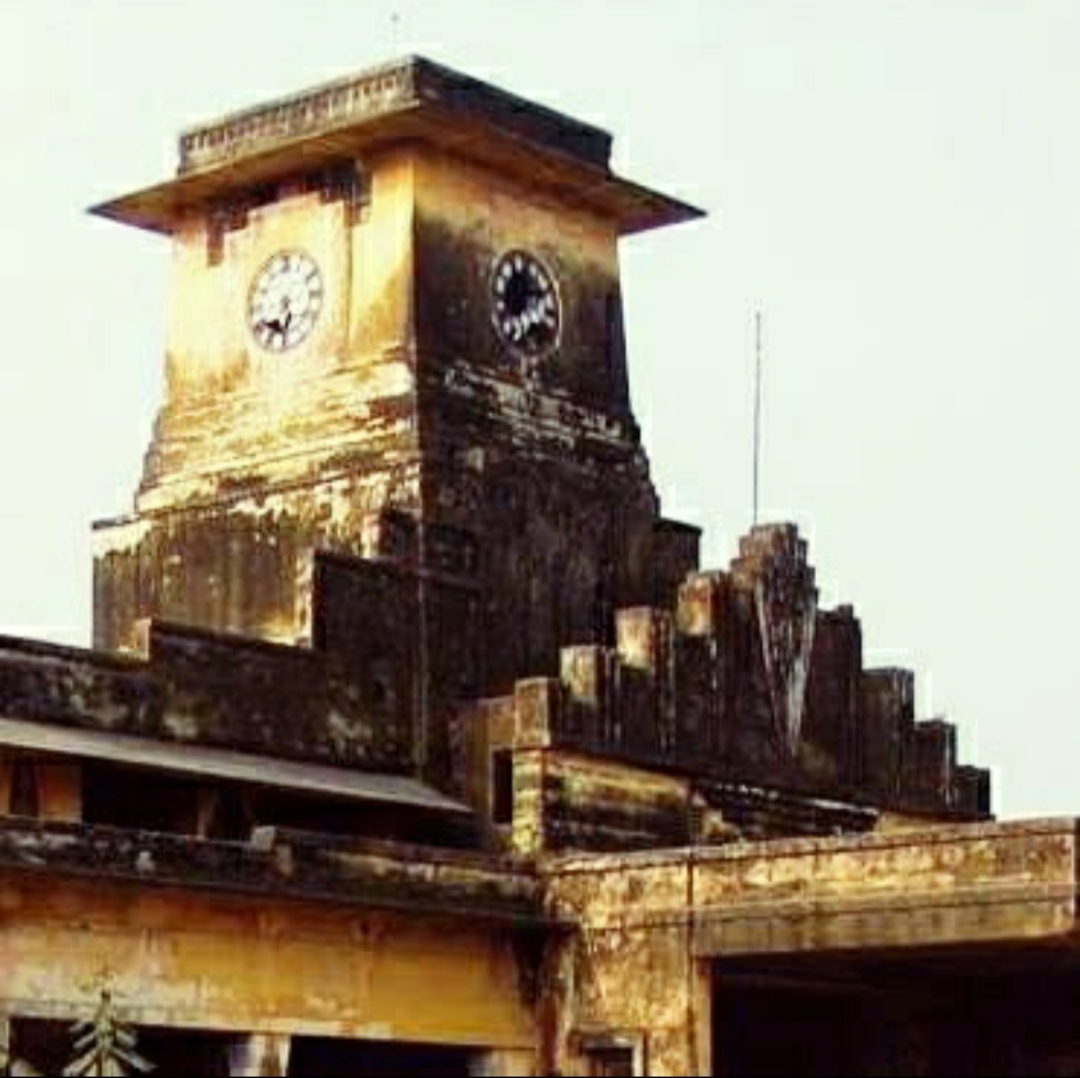
Ghanta Ghar of Bettiah Raj Mahal

In 1244 A.D., Gangeshwar Dev, a Bhumihar of the Jaitharia clan, Now known as Bhumihar Brahmin. settled at Jaithar in Champaran. One of his descendants, Agar Sen, acquired large territories during the reign of Emperor Jahangir, and was bestowed the title of 'Raja' by Emperor Shah Jahan. In 1659, he was succeeded by his son Raja Gaj Singh, who built the palace of the family at Bettiah. He died in 1694 A.D. The palace stands today and is used as a marketplace.

In 1740, a Roman Catholic mission was founded in the city. On 7 December 1745 AD, Father Joseph Mary, Father Cassen, and Nepali Christian Michael arrived in Bettiah from Nepal. The King of Bettiah provided them with a house located in front of the royal court. This three-room house became the center of their activities. One room served as a clinic where free medicines were distributed to the general public, the second room was a Christian prayer house—a small church, and the third room was dedicated to providing religious education. From this modest setting, the propagation of Christianity began in Bettiah, laying the foundation for what would later become the presence of the Catholic Church in the northern Indian subcontinent, as well as the foundation of the Bettiah Christian community.

In 1765, when the East India Company acquired the Diwani, the Bettiah Raj held the largest amount of territory under its jurisdiction. It consisted of all of Champaran except for a small portion held by the Ram Nagar Raj.

Maharaja Sir Harendra Kishore Singh was the last king of Bettiah Raj. He was born in 1854 and succeeded his father, the late Maharaja Rajendra Kishore Singh Bahadur in 1883. In 1884, he received the title of Maharaja Bahadur as a personal distinction and a Khilat and a sanad from the hands of the Lieutenant Governor of Bengal, Sir Augustus Rivers Thompson. He was appointed a Knight Commander of the Most Eminent Order of the Indian Empire on 1 March 1889. He was appointed a member of the Legislative Council of Bengal in January 1891. He was also a member of The Asiatic Society. He was the last ruler of Bettiah Raj. Maharaja Sir Harendra Kishore Singh Bahadur died heirless on 26 March 1893, leaving behind two widows, Maharani Sheo Ratna Kunwar and Maharani Janki Kunwar . There are a few institutions named after the queen Maharani Janki Kunwar, such as M.J.K College and M.J.K Hospital.

The Bettiah Gharana was one of the oldest styles of vocalised music. Madhuban was part of the erstwhile 'Bettiah Raj'. Internal disputes and family quarrels divided the Bettiah Raj as time went on. As a result, the Madhuban Raj was created.

In 1869, Bettiah was constituted and affirmed as a municipality.

A section of Dhrupad singers of Dilli Gharana (Delhi Gharana) from the Mughal Emperor Shah Jahan's court had migrated to Bettiah under the patronage of Bettiah Raj, and thus was sown the seed of Bettiah Gharana. The well-known Dagar brothers had praised the Bettiah Dhrupad singers and some of them were invited to the Bharat Bhavan in Bhopal to perform with other accomplished singers in 1990.

The University of Bihar has a local branch of its college in Bettiah, M.J.K. College, first established in 1955 under the name of Bettiah Mahavidyalya. The current name is in honour of Maharani Janki Kunwar of the Bettiah Raj.

On 26 December 2020, Bettiah became a municipal corporation. It includes San Saraiyan Tola, Banuchapar, Purvi Kargahiya and nearby areas. Development and upgrades to the local infrastructure are planned.

== Geography ==
=== Climate ===
The climate of Bettiah is characterised by high temperatures and high precipitation especially during the monsoon season. The Köppen Climate Classification sub-type for this climate is "Cwa" (Dry-winter humid subtropical climate).

Climate data for Bettiah
Month	Jan	Feb	Mar	Apr	May	Jun	Jul	Aug	Sep	Oct	Nov	Dec	Year
Mean daily maximum °C (°F)	23.3 (73.9)	26.3 (79.4)	32.4 (90.3)	37.3 (99.1)	38.7 (101.7)	37 (99)	33.5 (92.3)	32.8 (91.1)	33.3 (91.9)	32.3 (90.1)	29.2 (84.6)	24.6 (76.2)	31.7 (89.1)
Daily mean °C (°F)	16.2 (61.1)	18.7 (65.6)	24.2 (75.5)	29.2 (84.6)	32 (89)	32 (89)	29.6 (85.3)	29.1 (84.4)	28.9 (84.1)	26.6 (79.9)	21.9 (71.4)	17.4 (63.3)	25.4 (77.8)
Mean daily minimum °C (°F)	9.1 (48.3)	11.1 (51.9)	16.1 (60.9)	21.2 (70.2)	24.6 (76.2)	26.2 (79.1)	25.7 (78.3)	25.4 (77.8)	24.6 (76.3)	21.0 (69.8)	14.6 (58.2)	10.2 (50.4)	19.2 (66.5)
Average precipitation mm (inches)	13 (0.5)	13 (0.5)	10 (0.4)	18 (0.7)	46 (1.8)	200 (7.7)	380 (14.9)	360 (14)	230 (8.9)	66 (2.6)	5.1 (0.2)	5.1 (0.2)	1,330 (52.4)
Average precipitation days	1.4	1.1	1.1	1.0	2.1	5.4	10.9	11.9	7.3	2.4	0.6	0.7	45.7
Mean daily sunshine hours	11.1	11.7	12.4	13.2	13.9	14.2	14.1	13.5	12.7	11.9	11.2	10.9	12.6
Source: Weatherbase

== Demographics ==
Religions in Bettiah
Religion	Percent
Hindus	64.08%
Muslims	33.72%
Christians	1.90%
Others	0.30%

As of 2011 Indian Census, Bettiah NP had a total population of 132,209, of which 69,529 were males and 62,680 were females. Population within the age group of 0 to 6 years was 18,995. The total number of literates in Bettiah was 91,298, which constituted 69.1% of the population with male literacy of 72.7% and female literacy of 64.9%. The effective literacy rate of 7+ population of Bettiah was 80.6%, of which male literacy rate was 85.0% and female literacy rate was 75.8%. The Scheduled Castes and Scheduled Tribes population was 8,266 and 828 respectively. Bettiah had 24,463 households in 2011.

As per 2011 census, the Bettiah Urban Agglomeration had a total population of 156,200, with 82,663 males and 73,537 females. The population within the age group of 0 to 6 years was 22,067, and the effective literacy rate (literacy of people above the age of 7) was 80.89%. The urban agglomeration includes Bettiah (municipal corporation), Mansaraut Tola (census town), Purvi Kargahia (census town) and Hat Saraiya (census town).

On 26 December 2020, Bettiah became a municipal corporation. It included San Saraiyan Tola, Banuchapar, Purvi Kargahiya, and other nearby areas. The total population at this time was 414,453.

== Notable landmarks ==
- Amwaman Lake- state's first water sports zone
- Sagar Pokhra Bettiah
- Udaypur Wildlife Sanctuary
- Hajarimal Dharmshala- Shyam Baba Mandir
- Mata Ranisati Mandir
- Gopinath Panchayat Mandir
- Sant Ghat Mandir & River Bank
- Joda Shivalay Mandir
- Saraiyaman Jheel
- Shahid Smarak
- Raj Dwedhy- Raj Palace
- Raj Kachahri
- Nazarbagh Park
- Maa Kalibagh Dham
- Sidhpith Patjirwa Mata Mandir
- Durgabagh Mandir
- Christian Quarter Catholic Church
- Jangi Mosque
- Machhli Lok
- Valmiki National Park- a tiger reserve

== Transport ==
=== Railway ===
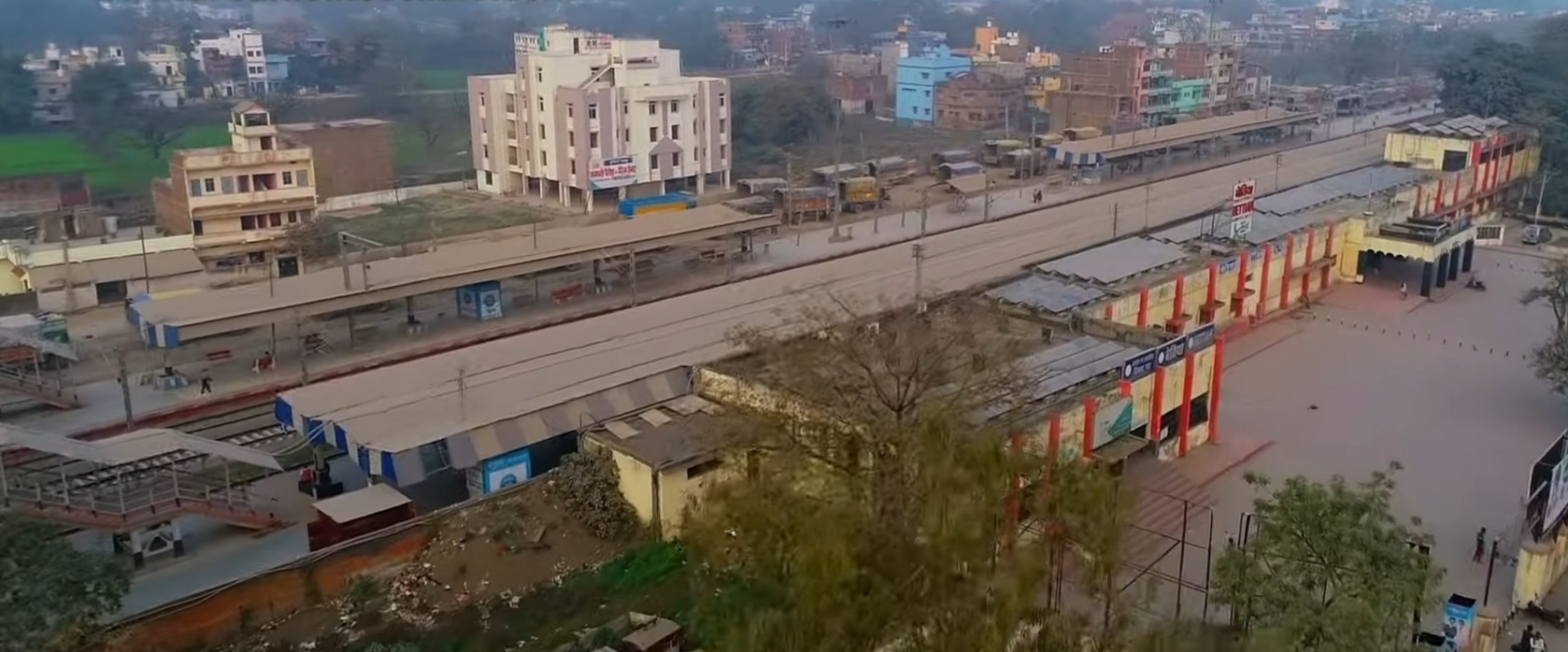
Bettiah Railway Station

Bettiah is connected to different cities of India through railways. Bettiah railway station is the main railway station serving the city. Direct trains are available to all the major destinations across India like Patna, Delhi, Mumbai, Kolkata, Guwahati, Ahmedabad, Lucknow, Jaipur, Jammu & Katra, etc.

Prajapati Halt railway station, also known as Bettiah Cant Railway station, is another railway station serving the city.

=== Roadway ===
The National Highways 727, 139W, 28B, 727aa, and State Highway 54 pass through the city.

The National Highway Authority of India (NHAI) has declared a new Patna-Bettiah road as National Highway 139W, setting the stage for the construction of a high-quality four-lane road between the two towns that would reduce the distance between them to 167 kilometres from the current 200-odd km, and travel time to around two hours.

The new Gopalganj-Bettiah Road passes through the New Town section of San Saraiyan Tola. Through this new road, a distance of 60 km (37 mi) is shortened from the commute to Gopalganj-Bettiah.

A new expressway is currently being constructed via Bettiah which links Gorakhpur to Siliguri.

A direct NH is being constructed to link Bettiah to Gorakhpur, designated 727aa. NH727AA connects Manuapul (Bettiah), Patzirwa, Paknaha, Pipraghat, and Sevrahi in the states of Bihar and Uttar Pradesh.

=== Airway ===
The nearest airport is Kushinagar International Airport which is about 97 km (60 mi) from Bettiah. The nearest airport in Bihar is Jay Prakash Narayan International Airport located in Patna which is about 200 km (120 mi) from Muzaffarpur and 177 km (110 mi) from Areraj.

== Education ==
=== Schools ===
- Alok Bharati Shikshan Sansthan English Medium School, Bettiah
- Amna Urdu High School, Bettiah
- Oxford Public Boarding & High School, Bettiah
- Assembly of God Church School, Bettiah
- Bipin High School, Bettiah
- Delhi Public School, Bettiah
- Jawahar Navoday Vidyalaya, Vrindavan, Bettiah
- Kendriya Vidyalaya, Bettiah
- Khrist Raja High School, Bettiah
- Kidzee Play School, Bettiah
- Krishna International Public School, Bettiah
- National Public Higher Secondary School, Bettiah
- Notre Dame Public School, Bettiah
- Raj Enter Secondary School, Bettiah
- R.L international School, Bettiah
- S.S. Girls High School, Bettiah
- Sacred Heart High School, Bettiah
- Sarsawati Vidya Mandir, Bettiah
- St. Joseph’s School, Bettiah
- St. Mary/Remijius High School, Bettiah
- St. Michael’s Academy. Bettiah
- St. Teresa's Girls' Senior Secondary School, Bettiah
- St. Xavier's Higher Secondary School, Bettiah
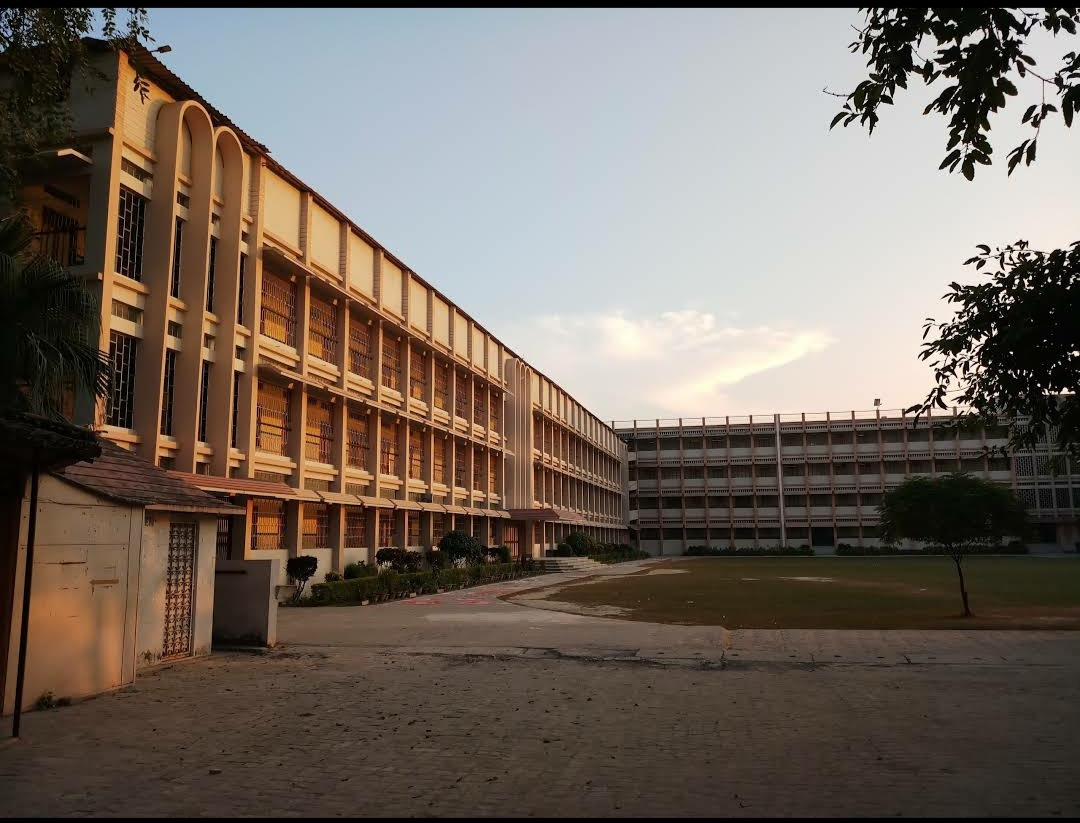
St. Xavier's Higher Secondary School

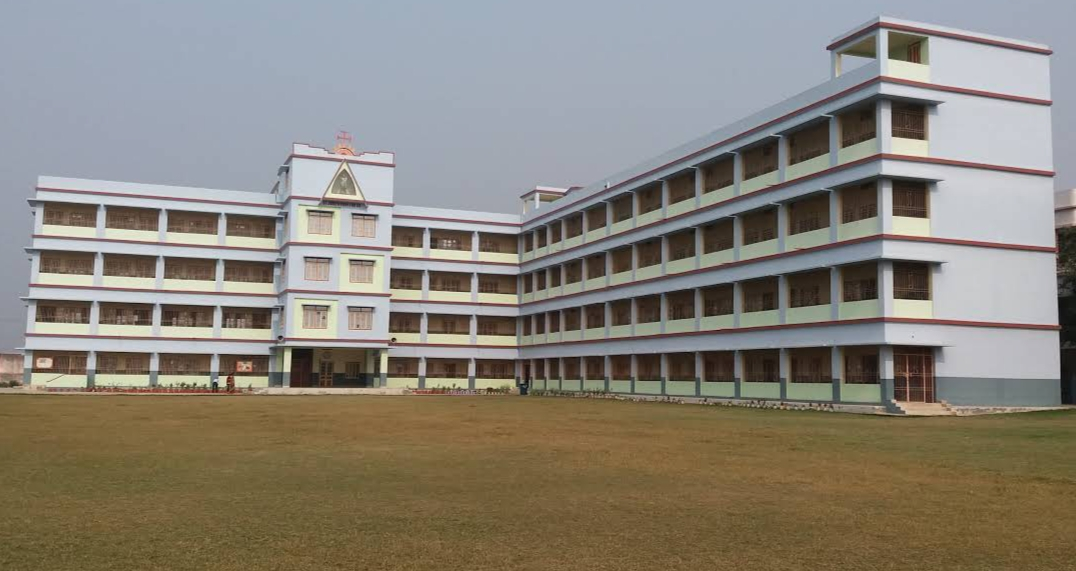
St. Joseph's School

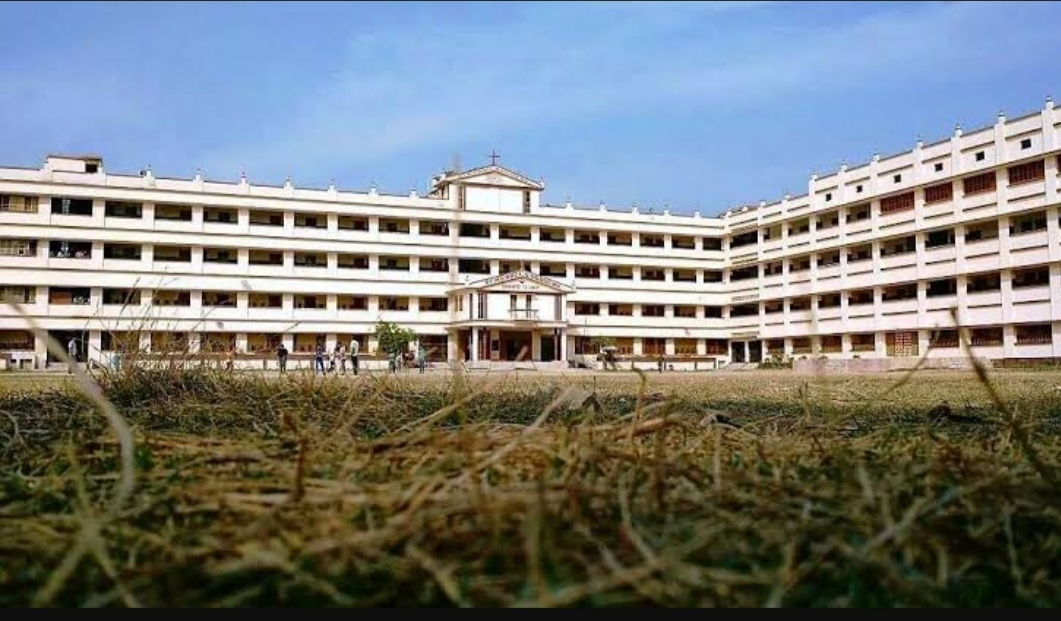
St. Michael's Academy

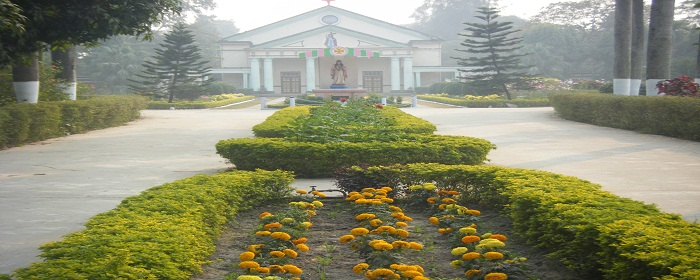
Khrist Raja High School

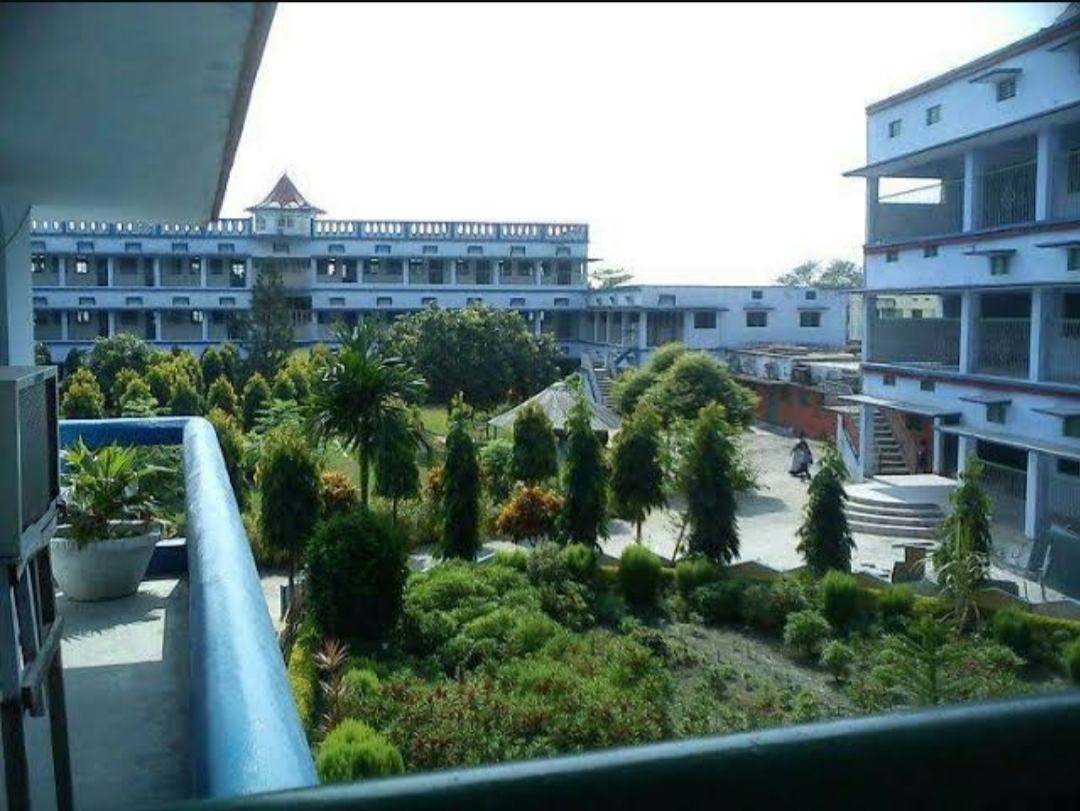
Assembly of God Church School

=== Colleges ===
- Government Medical College, Bettiah
- Government Engineering College, West Champaran
- Government Polytechnic, West Champaran
- Maharani Janki Kunwar College, Bettiah
- Ram Lakhan Singh Yadav College, Bettiah
- Gulab Memorial College, Bettiah
- MRRG College, Bettiah
- MNM Mahila College, Bettiah
- St. Teresa Primary Teachers Training College, Bettiah
- Chanakya College of Education, Bettiah
- Raj Inter College, Bettiah
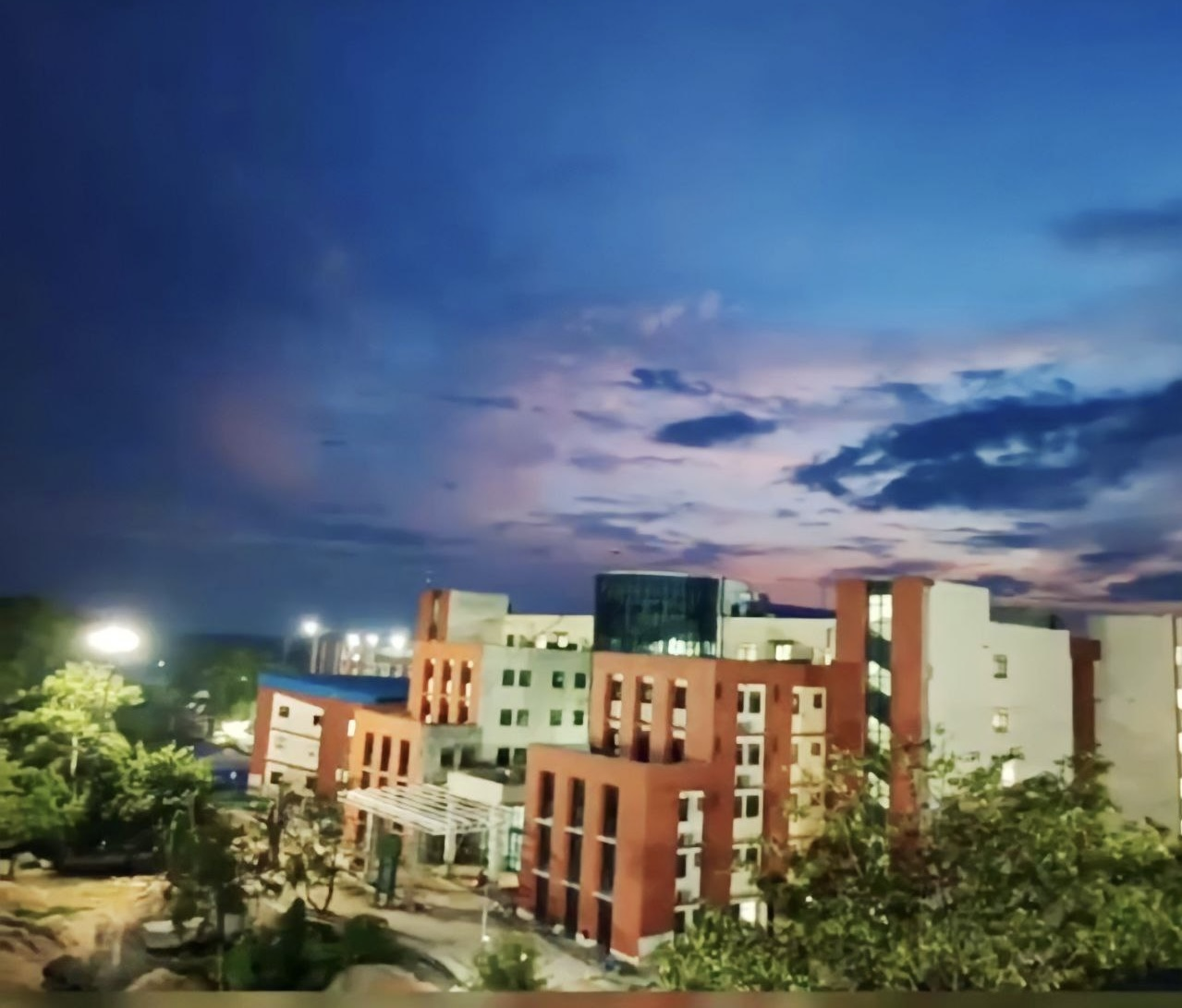
GMC Academic block

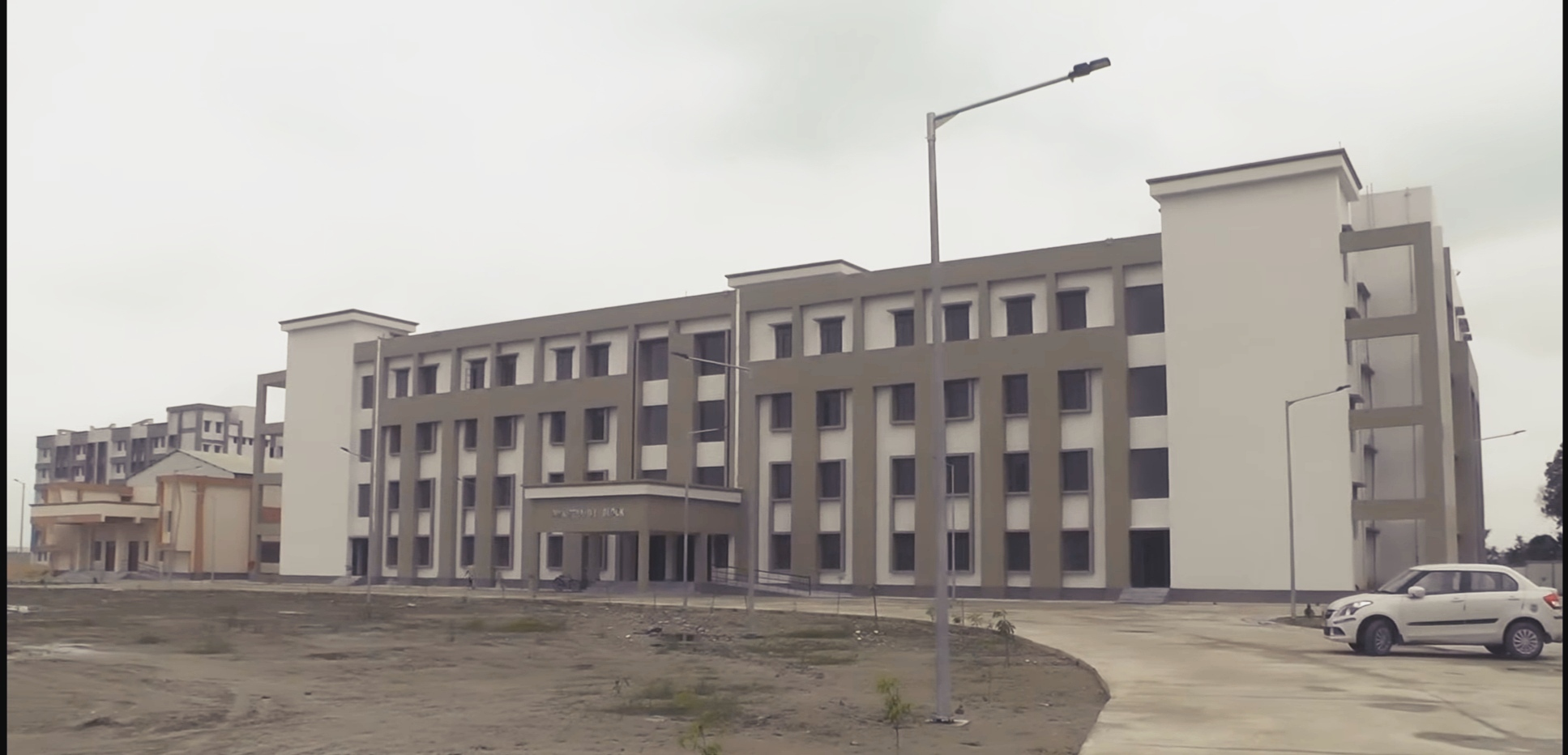
Administrative block of Government Engineering College Bettiah, W.Champaran

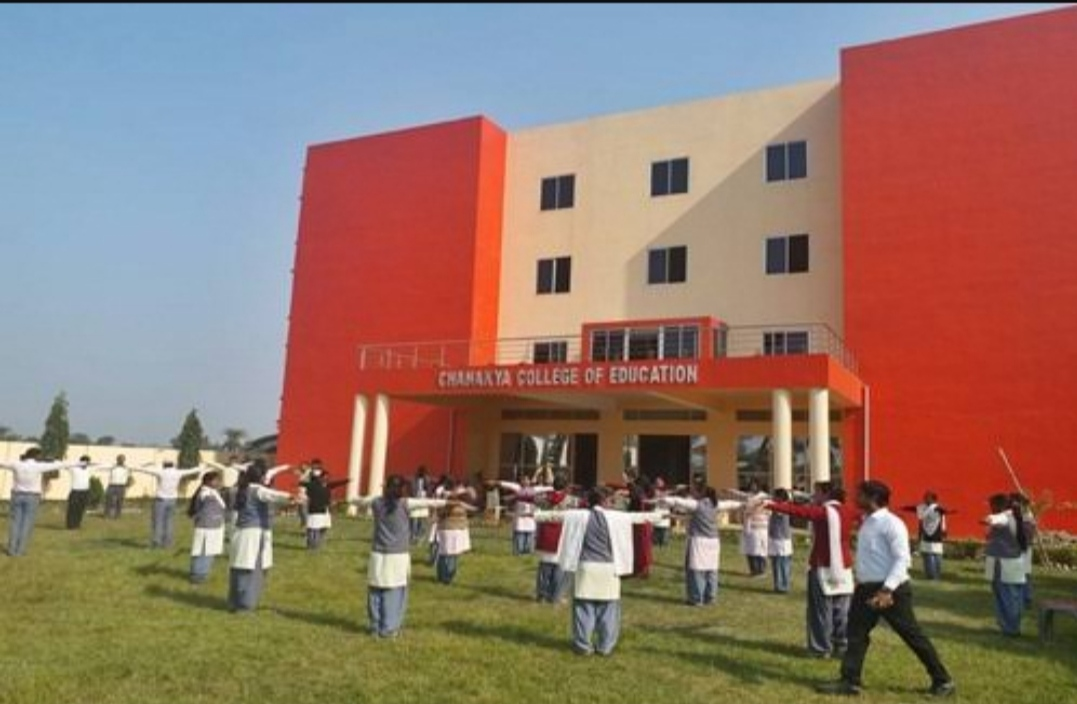
Chanakya College of education

== Notable people ==
- Manoj Bajpai, Indian film actor
- Prakash Jha, Indian film producer, director, and screenwriter
- Renu Devi, first female and 7th Deputy Chief Minister of Bihar
- Satish Chandra Dubey, politician and Member of Parliament, Rajya Sabha
- Sanjay Jaiswal, politician and president of Bharatiya Janata Party, Bihar
- Damodar Raao, Indian film Music Director, Singer, Producer, and Lyrics writer
- Krishna Kumar Mishra, former member of Legislative assembly, Chanpatia (Bihar)
- Vikas Mishra, former Vice-Chancellor, Kurukshetra University
- Gopal Singh Nepali, Hindi poet and Bollywood lyricist
- Gauri Shankar Pandey, former member of Legislative assembly, Bettiah (Bihar)
- Kedar Pandey, 14th Chief Minister of Bihar
- Raj Kumar Shukla, Indian independence activist

== The Literary History of Champaran ==
Freedom Fighter and author Ramesh Chandra Jha was the first person who penned down the literary history of Champaran. His research based books including Champaran Ki Sahitya Sadhana (चम्पारन की साहित्य साधना) (1958), Champaran:Literature & Literary Writers (चम्पारन: साहित्य और साहित्यकार) (1967) and Apne Aur Sapne:A Literary Journey Of Champaran (अपने और सपने: चम्पारन की साहित्य यात्रा) (1988) meticulously document the literary heritage and history of Champaran, Bihar. These seminal books continue to serve as foundational reference points for researchers, scholars, Ph.D. students, and journalists alike. Jha's exploration and preservation of Champaran's historical and literary legacy have solidified his place as a cornerstone in the field of literary research.

== See also ==
- Bettiah Raj
- Bettiah Christians
- West Champaran district
- List of cities in Bihar
- Champaran Satyagraha
- Paschim Champaran (Lok Sabha constituency)
