= Harendra Kishore Singh =

Maharaja Bahadur of Bettiah from 1883–1893

Maharaja Sir Harendra Kishore Singh was the last ruler of Bettiah Raj. He was born in 1854 and succeeded his father, Maharaja Rajendra Kishore Singh Bahadur in 1883 . He died childless on 26th March, 1893. In 1884 received the title of Maharaja Bahadur as a personal distinction and a Khilat and a sanad from the hands of the Lieutenant Governor of Bengal, Augustus Rivers Thompson. He was created a Knight Commander of the Most Eminent Order of the Indian Empire on 1 March 1889. He was appointed a member of the Legislative Council of Bengal in January 1891. He was also a member of The Asiatic Society
