= Lists of papal encyclicals =

This is a list of the lists of encyclicals which have been promulgated by Popes of the Catholic Church.

- List of encyclicals of Pope Benedict XIV
- List of encyclicals of Pope Clement XIII
- List of encyclicals of Pope Clement XIV
- List of encyclicals of Pope Pius VI
- List of encyclicals of Pope Pius VII
- List of encyclicals of Pope Leo XII
- List of encyclicals of Pope Pius VIII
- List of encyclicals of Pope Gregory XVI
- List of encyclicals of Pope Pius IX
- List of encyclicals of Pope Leo XIII
  - List of encyclicals of Pope Leo XIII on the Rosary
- List of encyclicals of Pope Pius X
- List of encyclicals of Pope Benedict XV
- List of encyclicals of Pope Pius XI
- List of encyclicals of Pope Pius XII
- List of encyclicals of Pope John XXIII
- List of encyclicals of Pope Paul VI
- List of encyclicals of Pope John Paul II
- List of encyclicals of Pope Benedict XVI
- List of encyclicals of Pope Francis
- List of encyclicals of Pope Leo XIV
