= Estrela Basilica =

Catholic basilica and landmark in Lisbon, Portugal

- Royal Basilica and Convent of the Most Sacred Heart of Jesus
- The basilica dedicated to the Sacred Heart of Jesus situated in Lisbon, Portugal

- Location of the church in the municipality of Lisbon
- 38°42′47″N 9°09′38″W
- Location: Praça da Estrela, 1200-667 Lisbon
- Country: Portugal
- Denomination: Roman Catholic
- Tradition: Latin Rite
- Religious institute: Order of Discalced Carmelites

History
- Status: Minor basilica
- Founder: Maria I of Portugal
- Dedication: Most Sacred Heart of Jesus
- Consecrated: 15 November 1789; 236 years ago

Architecture
- Functional status: Active
- Architect(s): Mateus Vicente de Oliveira; Reinaldo Manuel dos Santos
- Style: Baroque, Neoclassical
- Groundbreaking: 24 October 1779

Administration
- Archdiocese: Patriarchate of Lisbon
- Parish: Lapa

Clergy
- Priest: António da Franca Mello de Horta Machado Marim

The Estrela Basilica (Portuguese: Basílica da Estrela [iʃˈtɾelɐ]) or the Royal Basilica and Convent of the Most Sacred Heart of Jesus (Portuguese: Real Basílica e Convento do Santíssimo Coração de Jesus), is a minor basilica and ancient carmelite convent in Lisbon, Portugal.

Ordered to be built by Queen Maria I of Portugal as the fulfillment of a vow, the Basilica is a product of the Queen's strong personal devotion to the Sacred Heart of Jesus, and is considered an important architectural endeavour of her reign. The Estrela Basilica was the first church in the world dedicated to the Sacred Heart of Jesus.

== History ==
Shortly after her wedding to her uncle Infante Peter of Braganza in 1760, Maria, Princess of Brazil vowed, before an image of the Sacred Heart of Jesus in the Convent of Carnide, to build a church and convent under the Rule of Saint Theresa if she was given the grace of bearing children that would assure the succession of the House of Braganza. Princess Maria was, at the time, the eldest daughter and heiress presumptive of King Joseph I, whom she eventually succeeded after his death in 1777. She gave birth to her first child, Joseph, Prince of Beira, on 20 August 1761 (who died of smallpox in 1788, while construction of the Basilica was underway).

Only after acceding to the throne could Queen Maria afford to see to the fulfilment of her vow. Construction began in 1779; the groundbreaking ceremony took place on 24 October: the Queen's husband, Peter III, laid the first cornerstone and Fr. António Pereira de Figueiredo delivered the speech.

Mateus Vicente de Oliveira, an important court architect, is made in charge of the works: it is under his direction that the construction of the conventual areas was carried out (from February 1778 to May 1781), as well as the beginning of the Basilica. Oliveira died in 1785, and was replaced with Reinaldo Manuel dos Santos, who saw to the conclusion of the works. Reinaldo Manuel made substantial alterations to the exterior design of the church (namely, a different design of the pediment, of the façade, of the bell towers, and of the dome to which he added a roof lantern).

== Architecture ==
The huge church has a giant dome, and is located in a hill in what was at the time the western part of Lisbon and can be viewed from far away. The style is similar to the Mafra National Palace, in late baroque and neoclassical. The front has twin bell towers and includes statues of saints and some allegoric figures.

A large quantity of grey, pink and yellow marble was used in the floor and walls, in intricate geometric patterns, one of the most beautiful in European churches. Several paintings by Pompeo Batoni also contribute to a balanced design. The tomb of the Queen Maria I is in the right transept. A famous nativity scene made by sculptor Joaquim Machado de Castro, with more than 500 figures in cork and terra cotta is a major attraction to visitors.

== See also ==
- St. George's Anglican Church - located nearby
- 18th-century Western domes

== Gallery ==
Dome and lantern viewed from the roof terrace

Galilé entrance hall with its patterned marble floor

Nave looking toward the main altar

Interior of the dome above the crossing

Main altar and altarpiece

Blessed Sacrament chapel in the east transept

West transept

Tomb of Queen Maria I of Portugal
