= Papal document =

A papal document is any official written instrument issued by the Pope of the Catholic Church. The list below contains some notable types of papal documents.

- Apostolic constitution
- Encyclical
- Apostolic exhortation
- Apostolic letter
- Motu proprio
- Papal bull
- Papal brief

== See also ==
- Canon law of the Catholic Church
- Magisterium
- Lists of papal encyclicals
