= Primum =

Primum may refer to:

- Primum movens is a term used in the philosophical and theological cosmological argument for the existence of God.
- Quo primum is the name of an apostolic constitution in the form of a papal bull issued by Pope Pius V on 14 July 1570.
- The Primum Mobile is the outermost moving sphere in the geocentric model of the universe in medieval and Renaissance astronomy.
- The septum primum is a septum which subdivides the cavity of primitive atrium into right and left chambers in the developing heart
- Primum Familiae Vini is an association of family-owned wineries.
- Primum non nocere is a Latin phrase that means "First, do no harm."
- Primum Entertainment Group is a media company involved in the production and distribution of filmed entertainment properties and live events in Latin America.
- Cristilabrum primum is a species of air-breathing land snail.
- Ubi Primum (disambiguation), the title of five papal encyclicals.
