= Vix pervenit =

1745 encyclical by Pope Benedict XIV

Vix pervenit Latin for 'It has hardly reached' Encyclical of Pope Benedict XIV
- Signature date: 1 November 1745
- Subject: On usury
- Number: 2nd of the pontificate
- Text: In English

Vix pervenit (lit. 'It has hardly reached') is an encyclical, promulgated by Pope Benedict XIV on 1 November 1745, which condemned the practice of charging interest on loans as usury. Because the encyclical was addressed to the bishops of Italy, it is generally not considered ex cathedra. The Holy Office applied the encyclical to the whole of the Roman Catholic Church on 29 July 1836, during the reign of Pope Gregory XVI.

The encyclical codified church teachings which date back to early ecumenical councils, at a time when scholastic philosophy (which did not regard money as a productive input) was increasingly coming into conflict with capitalism.

== Historical context ==
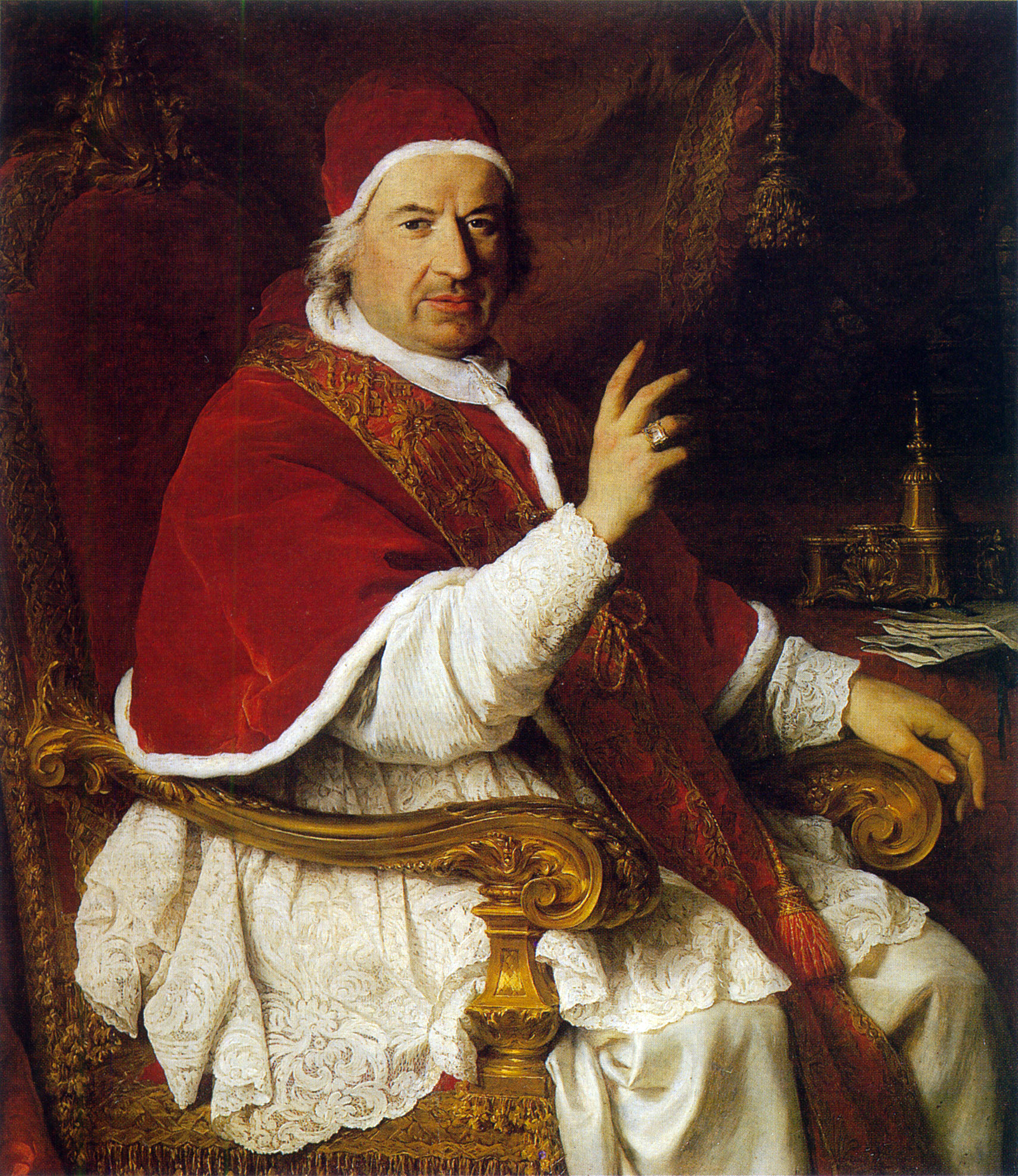
Pope Benedict XIV promulgated Vix pervenit in 1745.

Medieval Christian interest payment theology began with the First Council of Nicaea (325), which forbade clergy from engaging in usury. Later ecumenical councils applied this regulation to the laity.

Lateran III decreed that persons who accepted interest on loans could receive neither the sacraments nor Christian burial. Pope Clement V made the belief in the right to usury heresy in 1311, and abolished all secular legislation in the Papal States which allowed it. Theological historian John Noonan argues that "the doctrine [of usury] was enunciated by popes, expressed by three ecumenical councils, proclaimed by bishops, and taught unanimously by theologians".

However, the 16th-century Fifth Lateran Council gave explicit permission for interest-taking in some situations:

(...) We declare and define, with the approval of the Sacred Council, that the above-mentioned credit organisations (Mounts of Piety), established by states and hitherto approved and confirmed by the authority of the Apostolic See, do not introduce any kind of evil or provide any incentive to sin if they receive, in addition to the capital, a moderate sum for their expenses and by way of compensation, provided it is intended exclusively to defray the expenses of those employed and of other things pertaining (as mentioned) to the upkeep of the organizations, and provided that no profit is made therefrom. They ought not, indeed, to be condemned in any way. Rather, such a type of lending is meritorious and should be praised and approved. It certainly should not be considered as usurious; (...)

== Content of the encyclical ==
=== Title ===
As is usual practice with encyclicals, the text derived its title from the Latin opening words, which translate into English as "It has hardly reached [...]". The opening sentence refers to a debate, held in Italy at the time, about the validity of interest-bearing loan contracts, which had reached the Pontiff's ears.

=== Doctrine ===
The encyclical states:

The nature of the sin called usury has its proper place and origin in a loan contract. This financial contract between consenting parties demands, by its very nature, that one return to another only as much as he has received. The sin rests on the fact that sometimes the creditor desires more than he has given. Therefore he contends some gain is owed him beyond that which he loaned, but any gain which exceeds the amount he gave is illicit and usurious.

The prohibition was unequivocal, rejecting even "moderate or small" rates of interest.

=== Extrinsic interest ===
The encyclical, however, did allow extrinsic interest to be charged, stating that "legitimate reasons arise to demand something over and above the amount due on the contract" as long as those reasons are "not at all intrinsic to the contract". The Holy Office would later expand upon these extrinsic justifications for interest in 1780 and 1784 to include "compensation" for the hazards and delays of repayment.

== Effects of the encyclical ==
=== 18th and 19th century ===
The encyclical was published one year after an influential and controversial three-volume defense of usury by Francesco Scipione. Months after the publication of Vix pervenit, Maffei published a second, almost identical edition of his treatise-which contained the full text of the encyclical and a dedication to Benedict XIV, his friend-with the imprimatur of the Catholic Church. Papal historian John Pollard argues that the encyclical's prohibition on usury contributed to the dependence of the Holy See upon Jewish bankers like James de Rothschild.

The text of the encyclical was destroyed in several countries. In France, the ban on usury persisted until the French Revolution of 1789, the same year in which Turgot's Mémoire sur les prets d'argent, a defense of usury, was allowed to be published.

Pope Leo XIII's Rerum novarum (1891) laments that usury is "still practiced by covetous and grasping men". By the 19th century, the debate over lending within the Catholic Church disappeared, as the provision of credit had become viewed as political economy issue rather than a theological one.

In 1830, following the widespread acceptance of the Napoleonic Code, which allowed interest, throughout Europe, with the approval of Pope Pius VIII, the Inquisition of Rome, distinguished the doctrine of usury from the practice of usury, decreeing that confessors should no longer disturb the latter.

=== Current status ===
According to the Catholic Encyclopedia, circa 1912, "The Holy See admits practically the lawfulness of interest on loans, even for ecclesiastical property, though it has not promulgated any doctrinal decree on the subject". W. Hohoff in Die Bedeutung der Marxschen Kapitalkritik argues that "the Church has never admitted the justice of interest whether on money or on capital, but has merely tolerated the institution, just as under the Old Dispensation, God tolerated polygamy and divorce".

The Code of Canon Law promulgated in 1917, allowed those responsible for the church's financial affairs at the parish and diocesan levels to invest in interest-bearing securities "for the legal rate of interest (unless it is evident that the legal rate is exorbitant), or even for a higher rate, provided that there be a just and proportionate reason".

A specialist in Catholic social doctrine, Miller A., argues, circa 1994, that "the words 'bank' and 'banking' are almost nonexistent in the documents of modern Catholic social teaching. Perhaps because the medieval teaching was never formally retracted that money was unproductive and therefore money lending at interest was therefore immoral, yet the church itself became an active investor.... Or perhaps it was because the church was deeply involved in financial matters at the highest levels that it was in no position to criticise".

Writing for This Rock magazine, David Palm argued with a more holistic approach, taking into account Mosaic Law, the teaching of Jesus, the above-mentioned Fifth Lateran Council, development of economic sciences and especially the development of the practical economy since the Industrial Revolution, that the old economic mentality, expressed in Vix Pervenit, simply fails to capture the entire complexity of the modern world. The Fifth Lateran Council (1515) defined usury as follow: "For, that is the real meaning of usury: when, from its use, a thing which produces nothing is applied to the acquiring of gain and profit without any work, any expense or any risk". According to Palm, the sin of usury as defined by the Fifth Lateran Council dogmatically still exists in the Catholic Church, but the nature of financial transaction has changed compared to the time of the Fifth Lateran Council: "A loan that was usurious at one point in history, due to the unfruitfulness of money, is not usurious later, when the development of competitive markets has changed the nature of money itself".

No other papal solemn pronouncement than Vix pervenit touches the subject of usury, although in a 1999 speech John Paul II qualified usury as a "grave social plague".

== See also ==
- List of encyclicals of Pope Benedict XIV
- Interest-free economy
