= List of encyclicals of Pope Pius VI =

Pope Pius VI issued 8 papal encyclicals during his reign as Pope:

| No. | Title (Latin) | Title (English translation) | Subject | Date |
|---|---|---|---|---|
| 1. | Inscrutabile Divinae Sapientiae | | On the problems of the Pontificate | 25 December 1775 |
| 2. | Adeo nota | "So well known" | Against the usurpation of the rights of the Church in Avignon | 23 April 1791 |
| 3. | In gravissimis | "In the gravest" | Provision for the Church in France | 19 March 1792 |
| 4. | Novae hae litterae | "This new letter" | Against the Civil Constitution of the Clergy | 19 March 1792 |
| 5. | Dum Nos | "While We" | Against the usurpation of the rights of the Church in Avignon | 19 April 1792 |
| 6. | Ubi Lutetiam | "Where is Paris" | On the power of absolving from censure. Denounciaton of a false papal brief. | 13 June 1792 |
| 7. | Ignotae nemini | "Unknown to no one" | In praise of the Church in Germany | 21 November 1792 |
| 8. | Ad nostras manus | "To our hands" | Condemnation of a French book | 31 July 1793 |
