= Apostolica Sedes =

Apostolica Sedes – genitive form: Apostolicae Sedis or Apostolicæ Sedis –, meaning "Apostolic See", may refer to:

- Acta Apostolicae Sedis, the official gazette of the Holy See
- In Apostolicae Sedis specula, a papal bull issued in 1408
- Vacantis Apostolicae Sedis, an apostolic constitution issued in 1945
- Apostolicae Sedis moderationi, an apostolic constitution issued in 1869
- An Apostolic see (Latin: Apostolica Sedes)
- The Holy See, also called the Apostolic See (Latin: Apostolica Sedes)

== See also ==
- In Suprema Petri Apostoli Sede
