= Ubi primum (1740) =

Papal encyclical on the duties of bishops

Ubi primum Latin for 'When first' Encyclical of Pope Benedict XIV
- Signature date: December 3, 1740
- Subject: On the duties of bishops
- Number: 1 of the pontificate, 31 of the total

Ubi priumum (lit. 'When first') was the first encyclical issued by Pope Benedict XIV, addressing the responsibilities of Catholic bishops. Ubi priumum is notable for being the first papal document to call itself an encyclical. The beginning of the Catholic Church's modern social teaching is thus sometimes dated to 1740.

Benedict XIV later promulgated 30 subsequent encyclicals.
