= In Coena Domini =

1363–1770 papal bull issued annually on offenses against the Catholic Church

In Coena Domini was a recurrent papal bull between 1363 and 1770, so called from its opening words (Latin, "At the table of the Lord", referring to the liturgical feast on which it was annually published in Rome: the feast of the Lord's Supper), formerly issued annually on Holy Thursday (in Holy Week), or later on Easter Monday.

Its first publication was in 1363 under Pope Urban V. It was a statement of ecclesiastical censure against heresies, schisms, sacrilege, infringement of papal and ecclesiastical privileges, attacks on person and property, piracy, forgery and other crimes. For two or three hundred years it was modified as needed, receiving its final form under Pope Urban VIII in 1627.

Owing to the opposition of the sovereigns of Europe, both Protestant and Catholic, who regarded the bull as an infringement of their rights, its publication and associated ceremonial was discontinued by Pope Clement XIV in 1770.

== History ==
The ceremony took place in the loggia of St. Peter's Basilica in the presence of the pope, the College of Cardinals and the Roman Court. The Bull was read first in Latin by an auditor of the Sacred Roman Rota, and then in Italian by a Cardinal Deacon. When the reading was over, the pope flung a lighted waxen torch into the piazza beneath.

The Bull contained a collection of censures of excommunication against the perpetrators of various offences, absolution from which was reserved to the pope. The custom of periodical publication of censures is an old one. The tenth canon of the Council of York in 1195 ordered all priests to publish censures of excommunication against perjurers with bell and lighted candle thrice in the year. The Council of London in 1200 commanded the yearly publication of excommunication against sorcerers, perjurers, incendiaries, thieves and those guilty of rape.

The first list of censures of this Bulla Cœnæ appeared in the fourteenth century, and was added to and modified as time went on, until its final revision under Urban VIII in the year 1627, after which it remained practically unchanged until its formal abrogation in the 18th century. Under Urban V (1363) the list contained seven cases; under Gregory XI (1372) nine; under Martin V (1420) ten; under Julius II (1511) twelve: under Paul III (1536) seventeen; under Gregory XIII in 1577 twenty, and under the same pontiff in 1583 twenty-one; under Paul V (1606 and 1619) twenty; and the same number in the final shape given to it by Urban VIII.

The different excommunications now contained in "In Coena Domini" were originally scattered through a variety of bulls, and by degrees incorporated in the Bull published annually on Maundy Thursday.

The main heads of the offences struck with excommunication in the Bull are as follows:

1. Apostasy, heresy and schism.
2. Appeals from the pope to a general council.
3. Piracy in the papal seas.
4. Plundering shipwrecked vessels, and seizure of flotsam and jetsam.
5. The imposition of new tolls and taxes, or the increase of old ones in cases where such was not allowed by law or by permission of the Holy See.
6. The falsification of Apostolic Briefs and Papal Bulls.
7. The supply of arms, ammunition or war-material to Saracens, Turks or other enemies of Christendom.
8. The hindering of the exportation of food and other commodities to the seat of the Roman court.
9. Violence done to travellers on their way to and from the Roman court.
10. Violence done to cardinals.
11. Violence done to papal legates, nuncios etc.
12. Violence done to those who were treating matters with the Roman court.
13. Appeals from ecclesiastical to secular courts.
14. The avocation of spiritual causes from ecclesiastical to lay courts.
15. The subjection of ecclesiastics to lay courts.
16. The molestation of ecclesiastical judges.
17. The usurpation of church goods, or their sequestration without leave of the proper ecclesiastical authorities.
18. The imposition of tithes and taxes on ecclesiastics without special leave of the pope.
19. The interference of lay judges in capital or criminal causes of ecclesiastics.
20. The invasion, occupation or usurpation of any part of the Pontifical States.

There was a clause in the older editions of the Bull, ordering all patriarchs, archbishops and bishops to see to its regular publication in their spheres of jurisdiction. A letter of Pius V to the King of Naples establishes that this publication was not in fact carried out, due to opposition from the secular governments. Even the pious king Philip II of Spain, in the year 1582, expelled the papal nuncio from his kingdom for attempting to publish the Bull. Its publication was forbidden in France and Portugal. Emperor Rudolf II (1576-1612) likewise opposed it. The bull was nevertheless made known through diocesan rituals, provincial chapters of monks, and the promulgation of jubilees. Confessors were often ordered to have a copy of it in their possession; Charles Borromeo had a copy of it posted up in every confessional in his diocese. In Rome its solemn publication took place year after year, on Holy Thursday, until 1770, when it was omitted by Clement XIV and never again resumed.

A widespread and growing opposition to papal prerogatives in the eighteenth century, the works of Febronius and Pereira, favouring the omnipotence of the State, eventually resulted in a general attack on the Bull. A very few of its provisions were rooted in the old medieval relations between Church and State, when the pope could effectually champion the cause of the oppressed, and by his spiritual power remedy evils, with which temporal rulers were powerless or unwilling to deal. They had outlived their time. The excommunication of Ferdinand, Duke of Parma, by Clement XIII on 30 January 1768, proved the signal for a storm of opposition against the Holy Thursday Bull in almost all European states. Joseph I of Portugal issued an edict on 2 April 1768, declaring it treason to print, or sell, or distribute, or make any judicial reference to the Bull. Similar edicts followed in the same year from Ferdinand IV of Naples, the Duke of Parma, the Prince of Monaco, the free states of Genoa and Venice, and Maria Teresa, Empress of Austria, to her subjects in Lombardy. Emperor Joseph II followed the lead of his mother, and on 14 April 1781 informed his subjects that "the power of absolving from the cases reserved in the 'Bulla Cœnæ', which the pope had hitherto given in the so-called quinquennial faculties, was now and henceforth entirely withdrawn". On 4 May of the same year he ordered the Bull to be struck out of the rituals, and no more use to be made of it.

In 1769 appeared Le Bret's well-known attack on the Bull in four volumes, under the title Pragmatische Geschichte der so berufenen Bulle in Coena Domini, und ihrer fürchterlichen Folgen für Staat und Kirche in Frankfort. Towards the end he appeals to the humanity, wisdom, and magnanimity of the newly elected pontiff, Clement XIV, to suppress it. Clement, who already as cardinal had expressed his view as to the necessity of living in peace and harmony with the heads of Christian states, omitted its publication, but did not formally abrogate it. Pius V had inserted a clause in it, which stated that it would continue to have the force of law until the Holy See should substitute another in its place. In the quinquennial faculties delivered to bishops, the pope continued to grant power to absolve from its cases. This was done so late as 1855 by Pius IX. For these reasons theologians and canonists commonly held that the main provisions of the Bull were still in force. Nevertheless, there was good ground for supposing that the few obnoxious clauses that had outlived their purpose, and in the changed times were no longer applicable to the Christian community, had ceased to have any binding force.

The Bull was formally abrogated by Pius IX through the issue of the new Constitution Apostolicae Sedis moderationi, in which the censures against piracy, against appropriating shipwrecked goods, against supplying infidels with war-material, and against the levying of new tolls and taxes find no place. In the preamble to the Constitution the pope remarks that, with altered times and customs, certain ecclesiastical censures no longer fulfilled their original purpose, and had ceased to be useful or opportune.

In the controversies that arose at the time of the Vatican Council about papal infallibility, the Bull "In Cœna Domini" was dragged to the front, and Janus said of it that if any Bull bears the stamp of an ex cathedra decision, it must surely be this one, which was confirmed again and again by so many popes. Joseph Hergenröther, afterwards made cardinal at the same time as Newman, showed in his "Catholic Church and Christian State" the absurdity of this assertion.

== Sources ==
- Eadie, John. The ecclesiastical cyclopædia, 1862
