= List of encyclicals of Pope Francis =

Encyclicals issued during the pontificate of Pope Francis

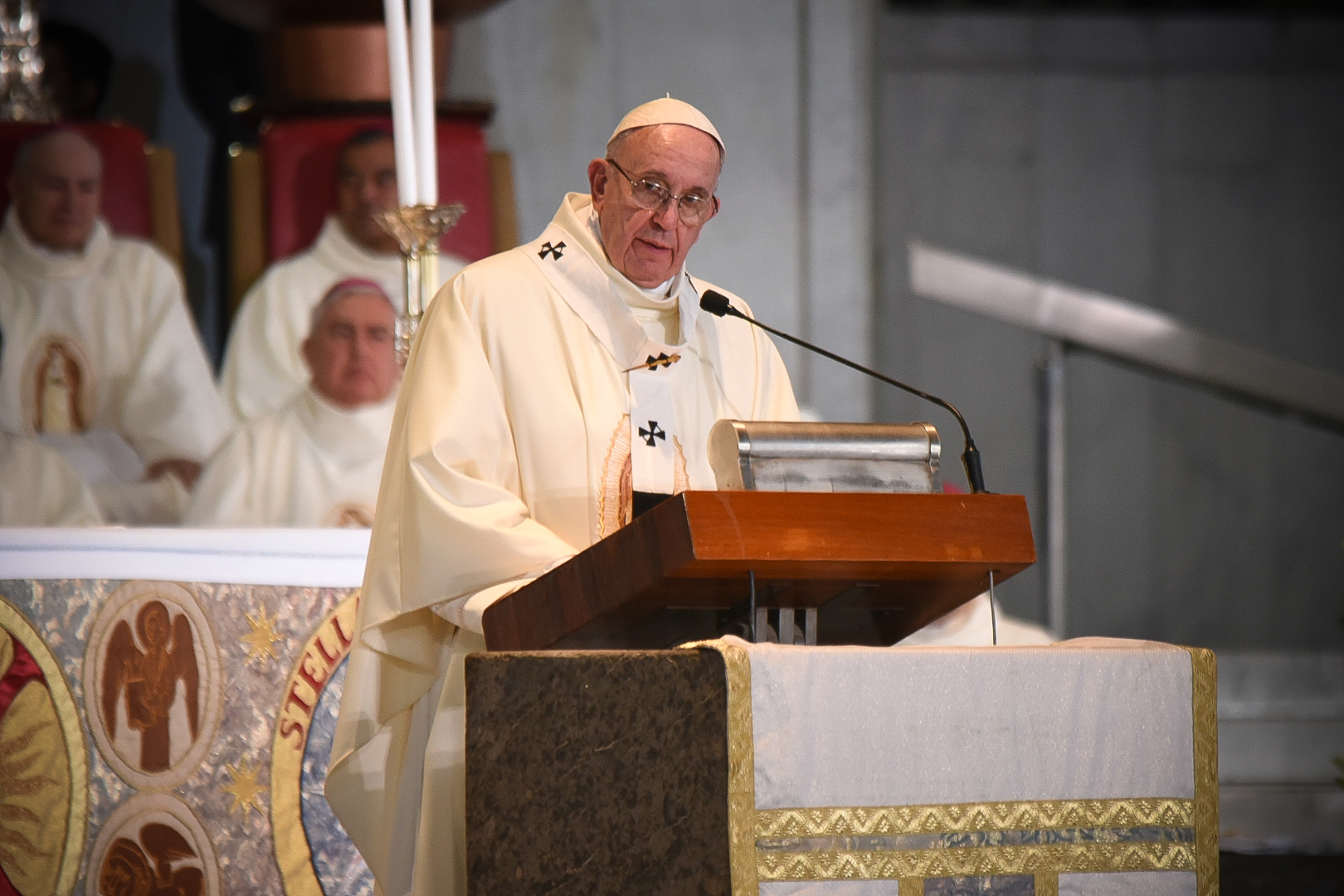
Pope Francis speaking in Mexico

Pope Francis (born 1936; reigned 2013–2025) issued four encyclicals during his twelve-year pontificate. An encyclical is a formal letter issued by the pope, addressed in modern practice to the world's Catholic bishops and, increasingly, to all people regardless of faith. Titles are drawn from the incipit—the opening words of the Latin text.

Francis used the form sparingly. Four encyclicals in twelve years places him among the least prolific encyclical-writers of the modern papacy, yet each document attracted unusual attention outside Catholic circles. The first, Lumen fidei (2013), was substantially drafted by Pope Benedict XVI before his resignation; Francis completed it and described the result as "written with four hands". The second, Laudato si' (2015), addressed environmental ethics and the link between ecological destruction and global inequality; it became one of the most discussed Catholic documents in decades. COP21 delegates and climate officials credited it with providing the moral framework for the negotiations that produced the Paris Agreement. Laurence Tubiana, France's climate change ambassador at the Paris negotiations and a key architect of the Agreement, said Francis "reframed totally the faith message around nature" and that his leadership "played a crucial role for leading us to the success at COP21".Fratelli tutti (2020) took human fraternity as its subject, invoking the example of Francis of Assisi and engaging directly with contemporary nationalism and populism. The fourth, Dilexit nos (2024), departed from Francis's previous encyclicals in scope and audience, focusing on the Sacred Heart of Jesus as a symbol of divine and human love and addressing itself primarily to Catholics rather than to all people.

Read together, the four documents share a consistent concern with what Francis has called the "peripheries": the poor, the marginalised, the natural world. Where earlier modern encyclicals often addressed Catholics alone, three of Francis's four were directed explicitly beyond the Church: Laudato si' to "every person living on this planet", and Fratelli tutti to "all people of good will, regardless of their religious convictions".

== Encyclicals ==
Title	English rendering	Principal theme	Addressees	Date	Text
Lumen fidei	The Light of Faith	Faith as a communal and historical gift; completed from a draft by Pope Benedict XVI	Bishops, priests, deacons, religious, and the lay faithful	29 June 2013	English · Latin
Laudato si'	Praise Be to You	Environmental ethics, integral ecology, and climate justice	Every person living on this planet	24 May 2015	English · Latin
Fratelli tutti	All Brothers	Human fraternity, social friendship, and rejection of nationalism	All people of good will	3 October 2020	English · Latin
Dilexit nos	He Loved Us	The Sacred Heart of Jesus; love as the centre of the Gospel	Bishops, priests, deacons, consecrated persons, and the lay faithful	24 October 2024	English · Latin
