= List of encyclicals of Pope Benedict XIV =

This article contains a list of encyclicals of Pope Benedict XIV.

No.	Title (Latin)	Title (English translation)	Subject	Date
1.	Ubi primum	"When first"	General Recommendations for Bishops	3 December 1740
2.	Pro Eximia Tua	"For Your Excellence"	Invitation to the Archbishop of Turin to put a stop to the practice done by priests of the commerce of alms from the masses.	30 June 1741
3.	Quamvis Paternae	"Although of the Father"	Reaffirmation of the dispositions of the Council of Trent on the appropriate way of appointing judges.	26 August 1741
4.	Satis Vobis Compertum		Recommendations to avoid the abuse of the Sacrament of Marriage	17 November 1741
5.	Etsi Minime		On the Instruction of the faithful, reaffirms the use of the catechism of Saint Robert Bellarmine.	7 February 1742
6.	Certiores Effecti		Invitation to the faithful to receive the Holy Communion when attending mass. Reaffirmation of the Council of Trent regarding the validity of masses celebrated by the priest without the presence of the faithful.	13 November 1742
7.	Cum Illud Semper		On the appropriate use of contests for the assignment of Parishes and Churches as promulgated by the Council of Trent	14 December 1742
8.	Quemadmodum Preces		Clarification that the Prayers for Sovereigns in the Mass are instituted by the Church and cannot be decreed by Sovereigns or the State.	23 March 1743
9.	Inter Omnigenas		On Christian Life in Ottoman Serbia	2 February 1744
10.	Cum Semper Oblatas		On the offering of Masses	19 August 1744
11.	Libentissime Quidem		Answer to doubts regarding fasting	10 June 1745
12.	Gravissimum Supremi		On Missions sent to the Kingdom of Naples	8 September 1745
13.	Vix Pervenit		On Usury and Other Dishonest Profit	1 November 1745
14.	Accepimus Praestantium		On the necessary and appropriate use of the Cross in the celebration of the Mass	16 July 1746
15.	Inter caetera		Against the abuses committed in Carnivals	1 January 1748
16.	Magnae Nobis		On Marriage Impediments and Dispensations.	29 June 1748
17.	Annus qui hunc		On the upkeep and cleanliness of Churches	19 February 1749
18.	Apostolica Constitutio		On Preparation for the Holy Year	26 June 1749
19.	Gravissimo Animi		Rules regarding communication with cloistered nuns.	31 October 1749
20.	Inter praeteritos		Detailed discussion on the right use of indulgences and Holy Years	3 December 1749
21.	Celebrationem Magni		Detailed instructions regarding the indulgence extension and history of extensions of indulgences	1 January 1751
22.	Prodiit Jamdudum		Regarding the last day of the carnival and the fasting of the feast of Saint Matthias falling on the same day	30 January 1751
23.	Elapso Proxime Anno		On heretics looking for asylum in a church after committing a crime	20 February 1751
24.	Magno Cum Animi		To the Kingdom of Poland regarding the use of private oratories for the celebration of Mass	2 June 1751
25.	A quo primum		On Jews and Christians Living in the Same Place	14 June 1751
26.	Cum Religiosi Aeque		On Catechesis	26 June 1754
27.	Quod Provinciale		To the Church of Albania prohibiting Christians of taking Muslim names in order to avoid persecution	1 August 1754
28.	Allatae Sunt		On the Observance of Oriental Rites	26 July 1755
29.	Ex Quo Primum		On the Euchologion	1 March 1756
30.	Ex Omnibus Christiani		On the Apostolic Constitution Unigenitus	16 October 1756
31.	Quam Grave		On punishments and judgements regarding the crime of pretending to be a priest	2 August 1757
