= List of encyclicals of Pope Pius VIII =

Pope Pius VIII issued one papal encyclical during his reign as Pope:

No.	Title (Latin)	Subject	Date
1.	Traditi humilitati	Condemnation of liberalism, freemasonry and certain Bible translation. On the sacrament of marriage	24 May 1829
