= Ubi primum =

Ubi primum may refer to:

- Ubi primum (1740), an encyclical of Pope Benedict XIV considered to be the first ever encyclical of the Catholic Church
- Ubi primum (1824), an encyclical of Pope Leo XII on his assuming the pontificate
- Ubi primum (1847), an encyclical of Pope Pius IX about discipline in religious orders
- Ubi primum (1849), an encyclical of Pope Pius IX to the bishops of the Catholic Church asking them for opinion on the definition of a dogma on the Immaculate Conception of the Virgin Mary
- Ubi primum (1898), an apostolic constitution by Pope Leo XIII regarding the Confraternity of the Rosary
