= List of encyclicals of Pope Pius VII =

Pope Pius VII issued four papal encyclicals during his reign as Pope:

No.	Title (Latin)	Title (English translation)	Subject	Date
1.	Diu satis	"Long enough"	On the difficult situation of the Church	15 May 1800
2.	Ex quo Ecclesiam	"From which the Church"	On the Jubilee of 1800	24 May 1800
3.	Il trionfo	"The triumph"	On the defeat of Napoleon	4 May 1814
4.	Vineam quam plantavit	"The vineyard which he planted"	Restructuration of the Dioceses in France	12 June 1817
