= Apostolicae Sedis moderationi =

Papal bull concerning canon law

Apostolicae Sedis moderationi is a papal bull (also described as an apostolic constitution) issued by Pope Pius IX on 12 October 1869, which revised the list of censures that in canon law were imposed automatically (lata sententia) on offenders. It reduced their number and clarified those preserved.

As is customary for such documents, the bull is known by its incipit, the opening words of the text.

== Background ==
Church laws imposing censures were multiplied in the course of centuries, some confirming, modifying or abrogating previous enactments.

The Council of Trent (1545–63) simplified them, but numerous new laws continued to be enacted, altering and complicating the previous situation. The result was confusion for canonists, perplexity for moralists, and often hesitation for the faithful. Hence the need for a general revision of all the material.

== Contents ==
The automatic censures that in their revised form were kept were organized in a number of categories according to the authority that had the power to absolve from them:

- Automatic excommunications, reserved to the Roman Pontiff in a special manner (12 censures)
- Automatic excommunications, simply reserved to the Roman Pontiff (17 censures)
- Automatic excommunications, reserved to bishops or ordinaries (3 censures)
- Automatic excommunications, not reserved to anyone, i.e., ones from which simple priests could absolve (4 censures)
- Automatic suspensions, reserved to the Pope (7 censures)
- Automatic interdicts, reserved (2 censures)

== Observations ==
Although a censure is merely a medicinal penalty, the chief purpose of which is the reformation of the person who has incurred it, it does not cease of itself merely by one's reformation. It has to be taken away by the power that inflicts it. The censures are classified in Apostolicae Sedis moderationi with respect to the authority that has the power to absolve from them. Any priest who has jurisdiction to absolve from sin can also absolve from censures, unless a censure be reserved, as a sin might be reserved; and some of the censures named in the bull Apostolicae Sedis are not reserved.

Some censures of Apostolicae Sedis moderationi are reserved to bishops; so that bishops, within their own jurisdiction, or someone specially delegated by them, can absolve from censures so reserved. Some are reserved to the Pope, so that not even a bishop can absolve from these without a delegation from the Pope. Twelve censures are reserved in a special manner (speciali modo) to the Pope; so that to absolve from any of these, even a bishop requires a delegation that specifically names them. These twelve censures, except the tenth, were taken from the bull In Coena Domini, so called because from 1364 to 1770 it was annually published at Rome, and after 1567 elsewhere also, on Holy Thursday. Of these eleven canonical offences, five refer to attacks on the foundation of the Church, that is, on its faith and constitution. Three refer to attacks on the power of the Church and on the free exercise of that power. The other three refer to attacks on the spiritual or temporal treasures of the Church.
