= Santa Teresa de Jesus de Carnide Convent =

Church in Lisbon, Portugal

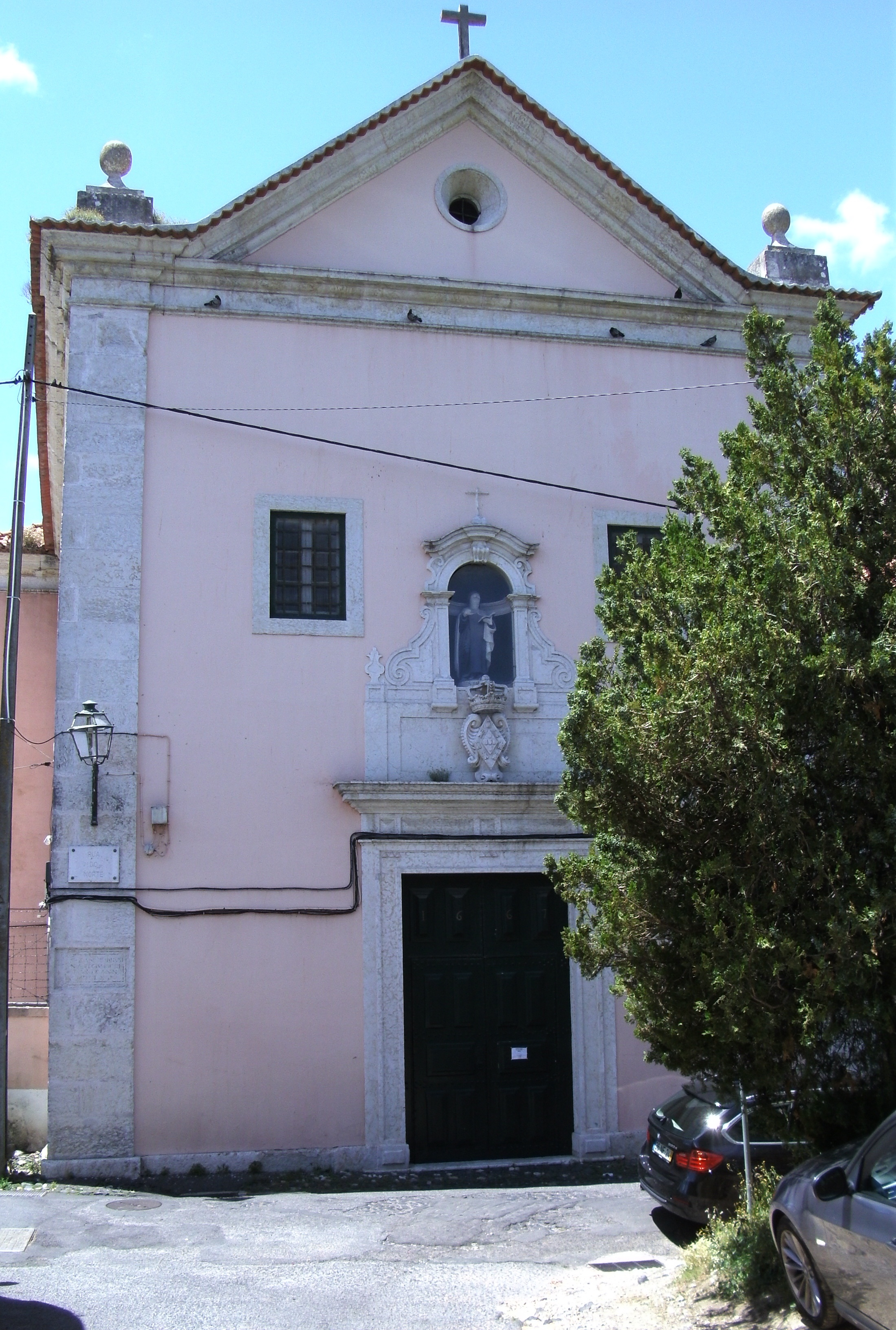
Santa Teresa de Jesus de Carnide convent.

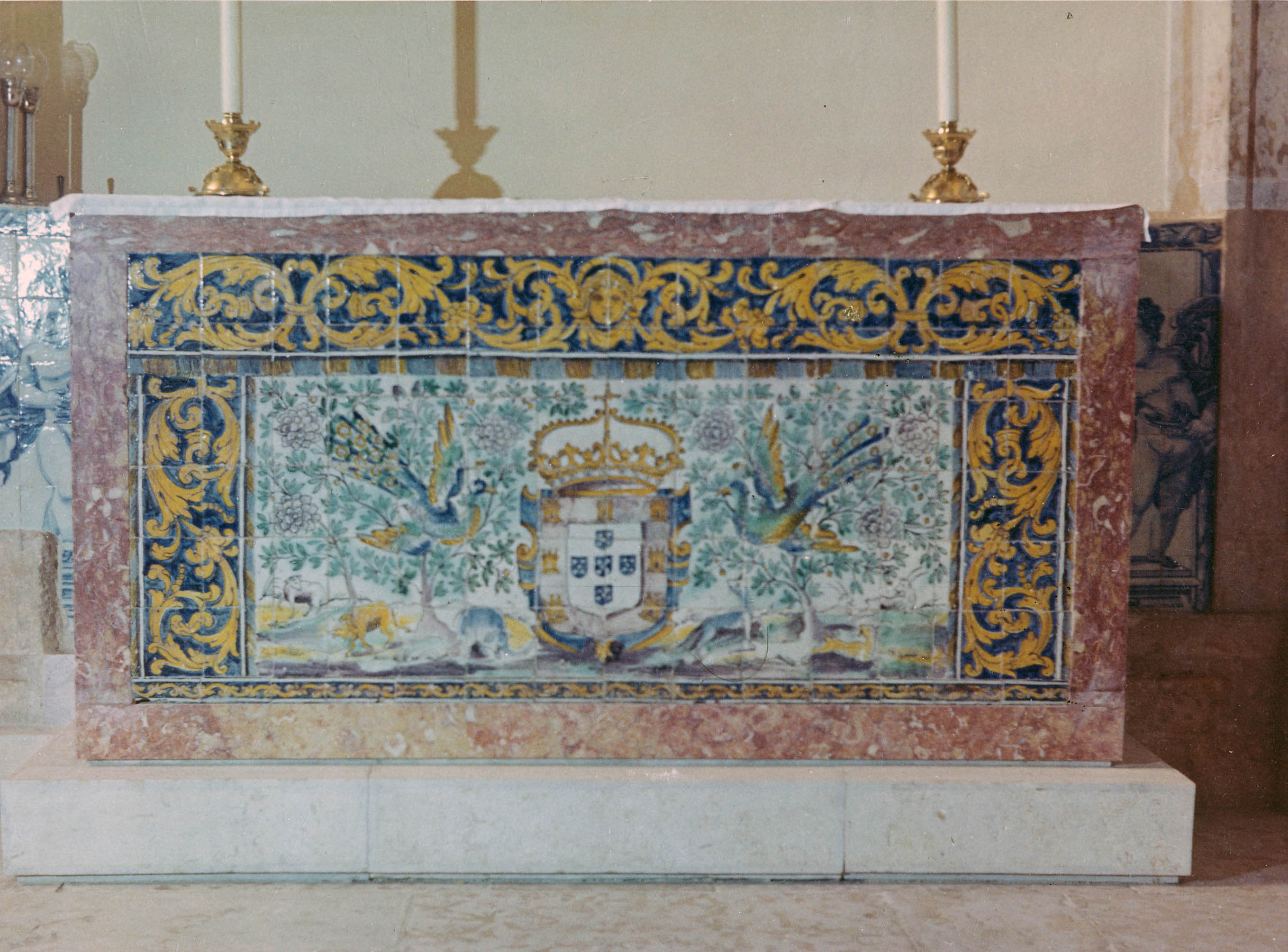
The altar antependium.

The Santa Teresa de Jesus de Carnide convent, also known as the Santa Teresa de Jesus of the Order of the Discalced Carmelites and of Santo Alberto convent, is located on the 45 Rua do Norte a Carnide, in the Carnide parish, in Lisbon, Portugal.

The convent was founded in 1642 by Micaela Margarida de Sant'Ana, daughter of the emperor Matthias of the Holy Roman Empire and John IV's niece, in a land donated by António Gomes da Mata, the kingdom's High-Courier.

In 1650, the religious house received D. Maria, the Infanta, who would then be educated there, wearing the Carmelites' habit in the year of her father's death. She was the one who sparked the church and conventual section's conclusion, as well as their ornamentation with various paintings, goldwork and utensils.

The convent hosted ladies and widows from noble families, and with the ban on religious orders in 1834, it would then serve as a religious retreat until the death of its last nun, in 1881.

== D. Maria, the Infanta ==
D. Maria, the Infanta, was John IV's daughter. She was born on 30 April 1644, Lisbon, and died on 7 February 1693. Her father recognized her and declared her legitimate, granting her a Donation Letter for the villages and terms of Torres Vedras, Colares, Azinhaga and Cartaxo. During her first six years, she was educated by the secretary of state António de Cavide. On 25 March 1650, she joined the Discalced Carmelites cloister in order to receive instruction from Mother Micaela Margarida de Sant'ana, the daughter of Matthias of Habsburg, one of John IV's relatives. Her education was commissioned to Margarida da Ressurreição, and after her father's death, in 1656, she started wearing the Carmelites' habit.
