= Pope Benedict XIV =

Head of the Catholic Church from 1740 to 1758

- Bishop of Rome
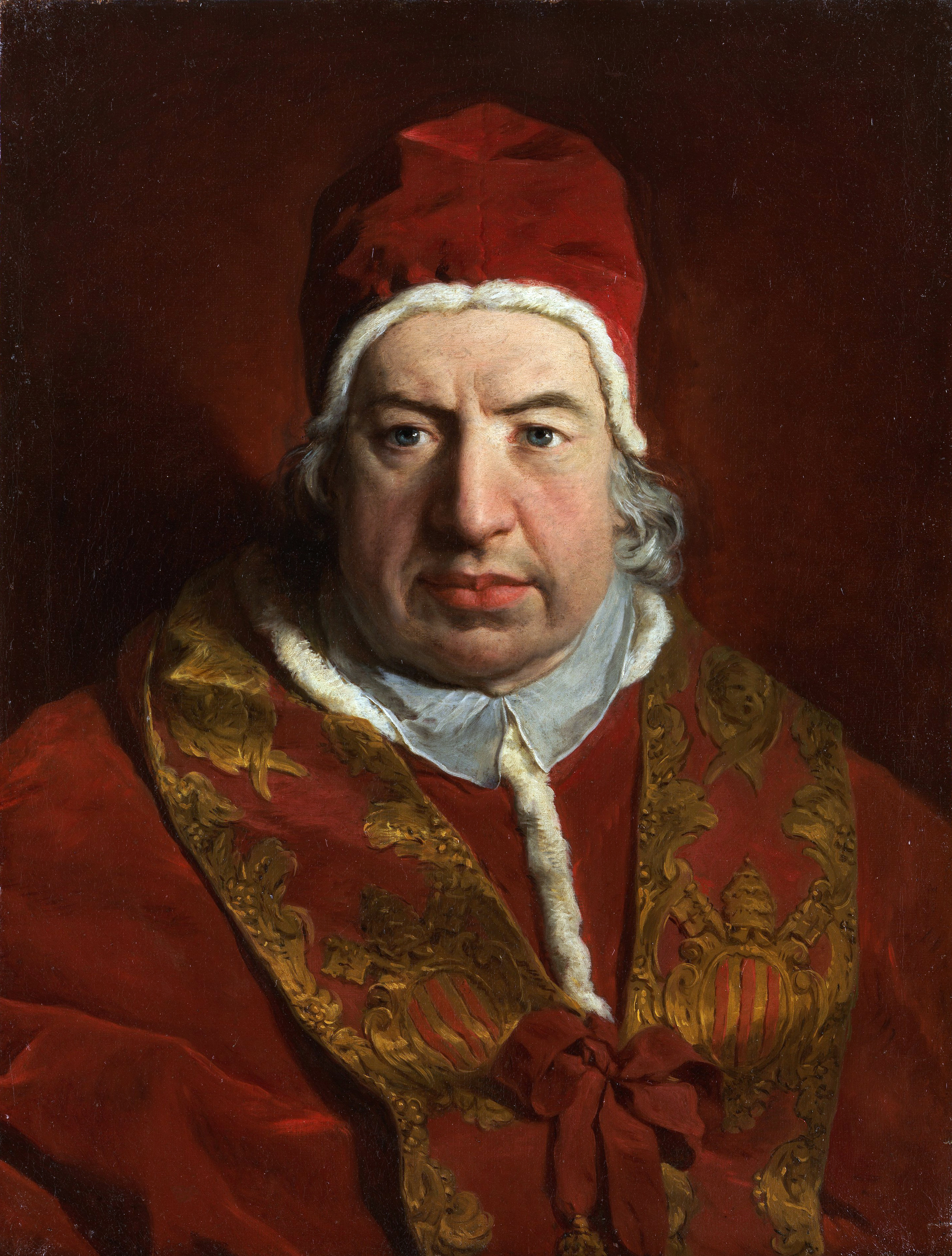
- Portrait of Benedict XIV by Pierre Subleyras, 1746
- Church: Catholic Church
- Papacy began: 17 August 1740
- Papacy ended: 3 May 1758
- Predecessor: Clement XII
- Successor: Clement XIII
- Previous posts: Assessor of the Congregation of Rites (1712–1713); Secretary of the Congregation of the Council (1718–1722); Titular Archbishop of Teodosia (1724–1727); Archbishop of Ancona e Numana (1727–1731); Cardinal-Priest of Santa Croce in Gerusalemme (1728–1740); Archbishop of Bologna (1731–1754)

Orders
- Ordination: 2 July 1724 by Pope Benedict XIII
- Consecration: 16 July 1724 by Benedict XIII
- Created cardinal: 9 December 1726 (in pectore); 30 April 1728 (revealed) by Benedict XIII

Personal details
- Born: Prospero Lorenzo Lambertini; 31 March 1675 Bologna, Papal States
- Died: 3 May 1758 (aged 83) Rome, Papal States
- Motto: Curabuntur omnes (Latin for 'All will be healed')
- Coat of arms

Papal styles of Pope Benedict XIV
- Reference style: His Holiness
- Spoken style: Your Holiness
- Religious style: Holy Father
- Posthumous style: None

Pope Benedict XIV (Latin: Benedictus XIV; Italian: Benedetto XIV; 31 March 1675 – 3 May 1758), born Prospero Lorenzo Lambertini, was head of the Catholic Church and leader of the Papal States from 17 August 1740 to his death on 3 May 1758. (Note: Pope Benedict X (1058–1059) is now considered an antipope. At the time, however, this status was not recognized by church historians, and so the tenth legitimate pontiff by this name is the one who took the official name Benedict XI (1303–1304). This has advanced the numbering of all subsequent Popes Benedict by one. Popes Benedict XI–XVI are therefore the tenth through fifteenth popes by that name.) His intellectualism and advocacy of science education earned him the nickname "the Enlightenment Pope".

Perhaps one of the best scholars to sit on the papal throne, yet often overlooked, he promoted scientific learning, the Baroque arts, reinvigoration of Thomism, and the study of the human form. Firmly committed to carrying out the decrees of the Council of Trent and Catholic teaching, Benedict removed changes previously made to the Breviary, sought peacefully to reverse growing secularism in European courts, invigorated ceremonies with great pomp, and throughout his life and his reign published numerous theological and ecclesiastical treatises. In governing the Papal States, he reduced taxation on some products, but also raised taxes on others; he also encouraged agriculture and supported free trade within the Papal States. A scholar, he created the Sacred and Profane Museums, now part of the present Vatican Museums. He can be considered a polymath due to his numerous studies of ancient literature, his publishing of ecclesiastical books and documents, his interest in the study of the human body, and his devotion to art and theology.

Towards the end of his papacy Benedict XIV was forced to contend with issues surrounding the Society of Jesus. He expelled them from Portugal at the behest of Joseph I in 1758, just before his death. The papacy reluctantly acceded to the anti-Jesuit demands while providing minimal theological justification for the suppressions.

Horace Walpole described him as "loved by papists, esteemed by Protestants, a priest without insolence or interest, a prince without favorites, a pope without nepotism, an author without vanity, a man whom neither intellect nor power could corrupt."

== Early life ==
=== Birth and studies ===
Lambertini was born into a noble family of Bologna, the third of five children of Marcello Lambertini and Lucrezia Bulgarini. At the time of his birth, Bologna was the second largest city in the Papal States. His earliest studies were with tutors, and then he was sent to the Convitto del Porto, staffed by the Somaschi Fathers. At the age of thirteen, he began attending the Collegio Clementino in Rome, where he studied rhetoric, Latin, philosophy, and theology (1689–1692). During his studies as a young man, he often studied the works of St. Thomas Aquinas, who was his favorite author and saint. While he enjoyed studying at Collegio Clementino, his attention turned toward civil and canon law. Soon after, in 1694 at the age of nineteen, he received the degree of Doctor of Sacred Theology and Doctor Utriusque Juris (both ecclesiastical and civil law).

=== Ecclesiastical career ===
Lambertini became an assistant to Alessandro Caprara, the Auditor of the Rota. After the election of Pope Clement XI in November 1700, he was made a consistorial advocate in 1701. Shortly after, he was created a Consultor of the Supreme Sacred Congregation of the Roman and Universal Inquisition, and then in 1708 Promoter of the Faith. As Promoter of the Faith, he achieved two major successes. The first was the canonization of Pope Pius V. The second was the composition of his treatise on the process of the beatification and canonization of saints.

In 1712, Lambertini was named Canon Theologus of the Chapter of the Vatican Basilica and member of the Sacred Congregation of Rites; in 1713 he was named monsignor; and in 1718 secretary of the Sacred Congregation of the Council.

=== Episcopate ===
On 12 June 1724, only two weeks after his election, Pope Benedict XIII appointed Lambertini titular bishop of Theodosiopolis in Arcadia. Lambertini was consecrated a bishop in Rome, in the Cappella Paolina of the Vatican Palace, on 16 July 1724, by Pope Benedict XIII. His co-consecrators were Giovanni Francesco Nicolai, titular Archbishop of Myra (Vicar of the Vatican Basilica), and Nicola Maria Lercari, titular Archbishop of Nazianzus (Papal Maestro di Camera). In 1725, he served as the Canonist at the Roman Synod of Pope Benedict XIII.

In 1718, the Istituto delle scienze ed Arti Liberali in Bologna had begun construction of a chapel for everyday convenience dedicated to the Annunciation of the Virgin Mary. In 1725, Bishop Prospero Lambertini of Theodosia, who was working in the Roman Curia but was mindful of his origins, ordered the chapel to be painted. He handed over the work to Carlo Salarolo, who had the walls of the chapel adorned. Lambertini also ordered and paid for the painting above the main altar, an image of the Virgin being greeted by the angel, the work of Marcantonio Franceschini.

He was made Bishop of Ancona on 27 January 1727, and was permitted to retain the title of Archbishop, as well as all the offices which he had already been granted. He was also allowed to continue as Abbot Commendatory of the Camaldolese monastery of S. Stefano di Cintorio (Cemeterio) in the diocese of Pisa. In 1731, the new bishop had the main altar and the choir of the cathedral restored and renovated. Once he became pope, Lambertini remembered his former diocese, sending an annual gift to the Church of Ancona, of sacred vessels of gold or silver, altar appointments, vestments, and other items.

==== Cardinal ====
Bishop Lambertini was created a Cardinal on 9 December 1726, though the public announcement of his promotion was postponed until 30 April 1728. He was assigned the titular church of Santa Croce in Gerusalemme on 10 May 1728. He participated in the 1730 conclave.

On 30 April 1731, Cardinal Lambertini was appointed Archbishop of Bologna by Pope Clement XII. During his time as archbishop, he composed an extensive treatise in three volumes, De synodo dioecesana, on the subject of the diocesan synod, presenting a synthesis of the history, Canon Law, practices, and procedures for the holding of those important meetings of the clergy of each diocese. He was in fact preparing the ground for the holding of a synod of his own for the diocese of Bologna, an expectation he first announced in a Notificazione of 14 October 1732. When the first edition of the De Synodo was published in 1748, however, the synod still had not taken place. He continued in the office of Archbishop of Bologna even after he became Pope, not finally resigning until 14 January 1754.

== Election to the papacy ==
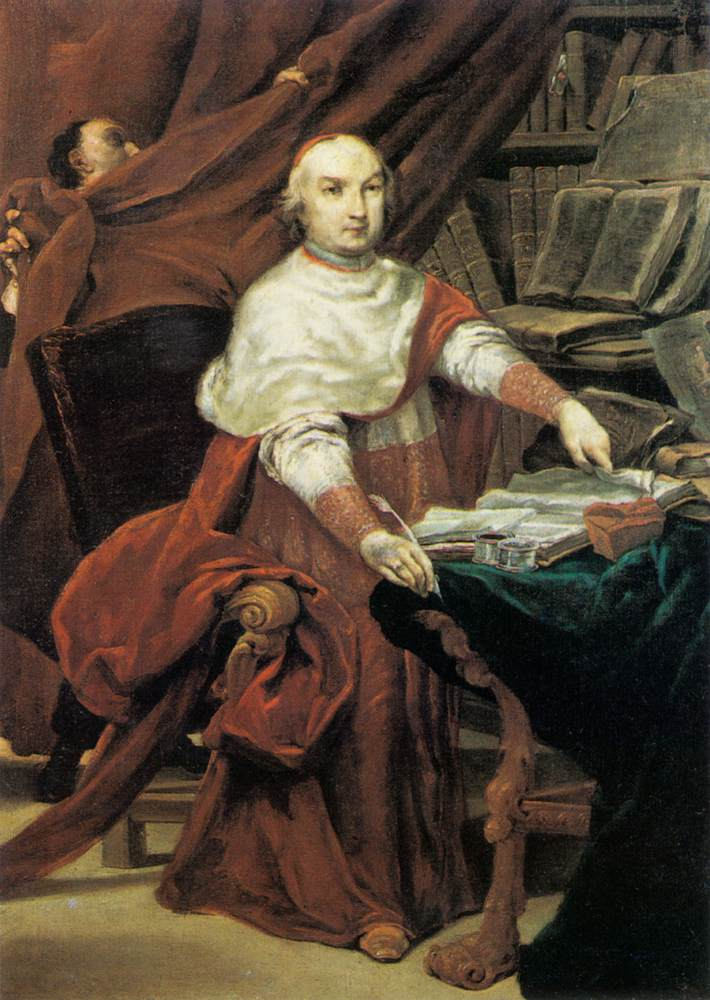
Cardinal Lambertini c. 1740.

After the death of Pope Clement XII on 6 February 1740, Cardinal Lambertini attended the papal conclave to choose a successor. The Conclave opened on 18 February, but Lambertini did not arrive until 5 March. He was not one of the 'papabili', not being one of the favorites of any of the factions (Imperialists, Spanish, French, Zelanti). The conclave lasted for six months. At first Cardinal Pietro Ottoboni, the Dean of the College of Cardinals, was favored to be elected, but a number of cardinals were opposed to him because he was the protector of France in the Papal Curia. His death on 29 February 1740 eliminated him from consideration.

Cardinal Domenico Riviera of Urbino received a respectable number of votes for a while, and then, in July, Cardinal Pompeio Aldrovandi of Bologna. He had enemies, however, who assembled enough votes to ensure that he would never get the two-thirds needed to be elected. His greatest enemy, the Camerlengo Cardinal Annibale Albani, chose instead to support Cardinal Giacomo de Lanfredini of Florence, who worked in Rome in the Curia. In mid-August, Albani asked the leader of the Imperialist faction, Cardinal Niccolò del Giudice, to give a thought to Lambertini. After long deliberations, Lambertini was put forth to the cardinal electors as a compromise candidate, and it is reported that he said to the members of the College of Cardinals "If you wish to elect a saint, choose Gotti; a statesman, Aldrovandi; an honest man, me." Vincenzo Ludovico Gotti (1664–1742) was professor of philosophy at the College of Saint Thomas, and perhaps the leading Thomist of his time. Cardinal Aldrovandi was a canon lawyer.

This witticism appears to have assisted his cause, which also benefited from his reputation for deep learning, gentleness, wisdom, and conciliation in policy. On the evening of 17 August 1740 at around 9:00 pm, on the 255th ballot, he was elected pope and took the throne name of Benedict XIV in honour of Pope Benedict XIII to whom he owed his ecclesiastical career. He was solemnly crowned by the protodeacon on 21 August 1740. By 30 August 1740 the famous ephemeral baroque structures of the Festival of the Chinea and the triumphal arch of Benedict XIV were erected by Charles VII of Naples, King of Naples and a papal vassal.

== Pontificate ==
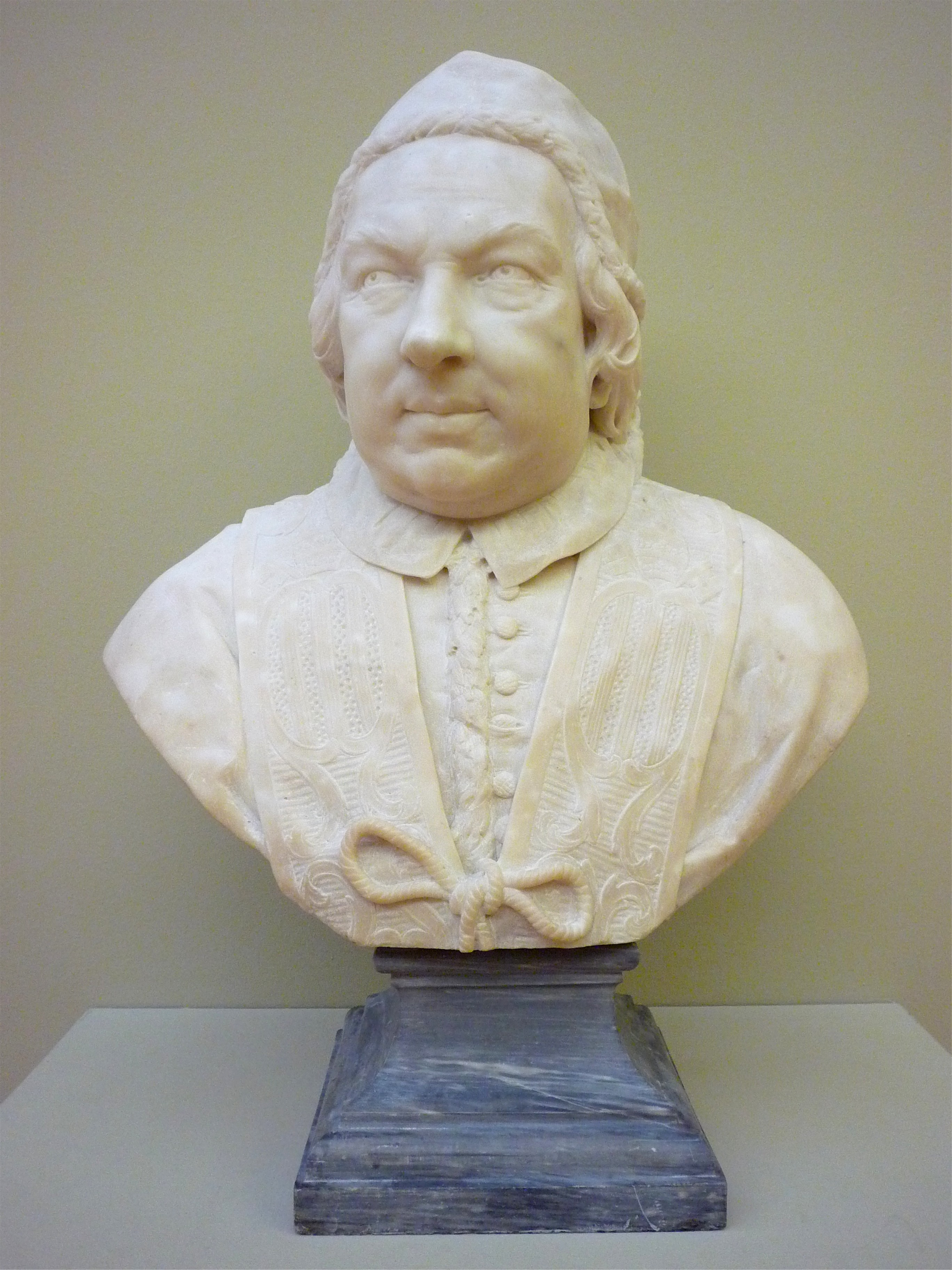
Bust of Benedict XIV by Pietro Bracci, Museum of Grenoble

Benedict XIV's pontificate began in a time of great difficulties, fueled by anti-clericalism and chiefly caused by the disputes between Catholic rulers and the papacy about governmental demands to nominate bishops rather than leaving the appointment to the church. He managed to overcome most of these problems – the Holy See's disputes with the Kingdom of Naples, Sardinia, Spain, Venice, and Austria were settled.

=== Pastoralis Romani Pontificis ===
The apostolic constitution Pastoralis Romani Pontificis, which was Benedict's revision of the traditional In Coena Domini anathematization, was promulgated on 30 March 1741. In it Benedict again excommunicated all members of Protestant sects, including Lutherans, Calvinists, Zwinglians, and Huguenots. It ordered that ecumenical councils not be resorted to by opponents of papal decisions. Its most stringent clause was §20:

We excommunicate all those who shall by themselves or others, directly or indirectly, under whatever title or pretext, presume to invade, destroy, occupy and detain, wholly or in part, the City of Rome, the Kingdom of Sicily, the islands of Sardinia and Corsica, the territories on this side of Lesina, the patrimony of St. Peter in Tuscany, the Duchy of Spoleto, the Counties of Venaissin, and Sabina, the March of Ancona, Massa Trebaria, Romagna, Campagna, and the maritime provinces and their territories and places, and the territories under special commission of the Arnulfi, and our cities of Bologna, Cesena, Rimini, Benevento, Perugia, Avignon, Citta di Castello, Todi, Ferrara, Comachio, and other cities, territories and places, or rights, belonging to the Roman Church, and mediately or immediately subject to the said Roman Church; and likewise those who presume to usurp de facto, to disturb, to retain, or in various ways to trouble, the supreme jurisdiction, belonging in them to Us and to the said Roman Church; and likewise their adherents, patrons, and protectors, or those who aid, counsel or abet them in any way whatsoever.

This clause, if applied, excommunicated the governments of Spain, France, and the Habsburg monarchy, in addition to lesser princes who held, without papal grant or investiture, territory claimed by the Papacy. The papal bull was smiled at even by Benedict himself, who once said, "I like to leave the Vatican lightning asleep." Its application to the Duchy of Parma by Pope Clement XIII in 1768 had major consequences, including the beginning of expulsions of Jesuits from European states.

=== Finances ===
At the beginning of his reign, the papal government was heavily in debt, to the amount of 56,000,000 scudi, and was running an annual deficit of more than 200,000 scudi. Benedict attempted to improve the finances of the Papal States, but even at his death the administration was still running a deficit. His greatest economic action was the reduction in the size of the Papal army, which had become ineffectual in terms of contemporary military practice, even in keeping order inside the Papal States; and he severely reduced the pay of both officers and soldiers. He instituted economies in his own household and in the bureaucracy, but these were insignificant in terms of the debt and deficit. In 1741, on the advice of Cardinal Aldovrandini (who had nearly been elected pope instead of Benedict), he instituted a new tax, a duty on stamped paper on legal documents; it did not produce the revenue expected, and it was abolished in 1743. He reduced taxes on imported cattle, oil, and raw silk, but imposed new taxes on lime, china clay, salt, wine, straw, and hay. In 1744 he raised taxes on land, house rents, feudal grants to barons, and pensions derived from prebends.

Despite these fiscal problems, the Papacy was able to buy two frigates in Britain, and in April 1745 Benedict personally christened a galley, named the Benedetta, which he had ordered constructed. He also ordered the modernization of the harbor of Anzio, but the work was so expensive that it had to be abandoned in 1752.

He encouraged agriculture and free trade and drastically cut the military budget, but was unable to completely reform the administration, still corrupt from previous papacies. At the University of Bologna he revived the practice of anatomical studies and established a chair of surgery. He had a clear view of ecclesiastical problems, had respect for differing opinions and an ability to distinguish between dogma and theory.

=== Opposition to indigenous slavery ===
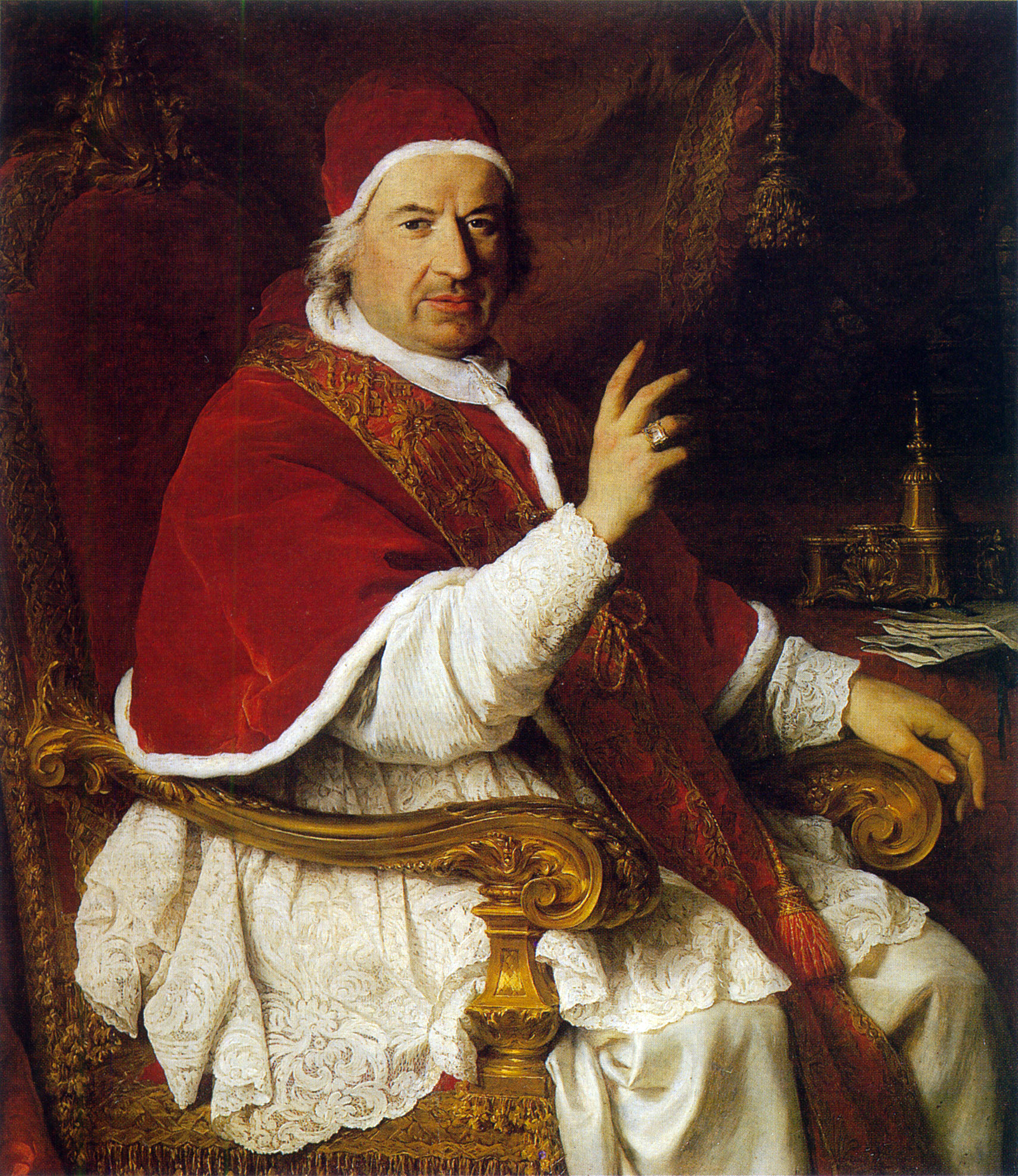
Benedict XIV in 1741, portrait by Subleyras

On 22 December 1741, Benedict XIV issued the Bull Immensa Pastorum Principis addressed to the Bishops of Brazil against the enslavement of the indigenous peoples of the Americas and other countries, calling on the support of King John V of Portugal towards this cause. It excommunicated any person who, for whatever motive, enslaved a native Brazilian. It did not address the case of black Africans. The Bull ordered the Jesuits to cease engaging in commerce, which was strictly forbidden by their own statutes, and meddling in politics. The bull went unenforced in Brazil.

=== Other activities ===
The Apostolic constitution Sacramentum Poenitentiae of 1741 assigned to the Supreme Sacred Congregation of the Roman and Universal Inquisition the responsibility of safeguarding the sanctity of the sacrament of penance.

On 18 May 1743, Benedict XIV signed a document addressed to the Archbishops and Bishops of the Polish–Lithuanian Commonwealth regarding marriage, communicating his dissatisfaction with the dissolution of Christian marriages, some even long-stable ones, by the Ecclesiastical Courts of Poland without due cause or in violation of canon law. Troubles arose from what are called "clandestine marriages", a secret arrangement between partners, usually for the purpose of marrying a person of choice rather than entering into an "arranged marriage".

Benedict XIV was also responsible, along with Cardinal Domenico Silvio Passionei, for beginning the catalogue of the oriental manuscripts in the Vatican Library. The Pope added some 3,300 of his own books to the collection. In 1741 the collection of manuscripts relating to Chinese religion and history were left to the Vatican Library by bequest of Fouchet, a one-time missionary. During his reign the library of Marchese Alessandro Capponi was acquired through bequest. The collection of the antiquarian Filippo Stosch of Florence also came to the Vatican Library after his death, including a large collection of manuscripts that went back as far as the twelfth century.

In 1747, Benedict promulgated the bull Postremo mense superioris anni, which summarised and restated certain aspects of Catholic teaching on infant baptism, in particular that 1) it is generally not licit to baptise a child of a Jewish family without parental consent, 2) it is licit to baptise a Jewish child in danger of death without parental consent, 3) once such a baptism had occurred (whether licit or not), the ecclesiastical authorities have a duty to remove the child from its parents' custody in order to provide it with a Christian education.

Benedict issued a papal bull, Providas Romanorum, in 1751 concerned with freemasonry, reiterating and confirming all that Clement XII had stated in In eminenti apostolatus in 1738, quoting the whole text. Benedict's bull called for the support of all "Catholic princes and secular powers" in enforcing a ban on freemasonry.

==== Oriental rites ====
Since his days as a Consultor at the Holy Office (Inquisition), Benedict had been involved in issues pertaining to the missions, both those seeking to convert non-Christians, and those seeking to reconcile heretics and schismatics to the Roman Church. One concern was the Coptic Christians in upper Egypt, where efforts to seek union with the Coptic Patriarch had not been successful. Numbers of Coptic priests and laity had entered into union with Rome, but had no bishop to serve their needs. In the Bull Quemadmodum ingenti of 4 August 1741, Benedict entrusted their care to the one Coptic bishop who was in union with Rome, the Patriarch Athanasius of Jerusalem, who was given extensive powers to supervise uniate Copts in Egypt.

On 7 August the same year, he supervised a commission of cardinals discussing the acts of the Lebanese Council of 1736 against some of which (such as the prohibition of mixed monasteries) one part of the Maronite clergy had brought forward some complaints. The Lebanese Council was declared legitimate by the commission and on 1 September 1741, Benedict XIV approved the acts of the Lebanese Council.

In his encyclical Allatae Sunt, promulgated on 26 July 1755, and sent to missionaries working under the direction of the Congregation de propaganda fide, Pope Benedict addressed the numerous problems arising in dealing with the clergy and laity belonging to various eastern rites, particularly the Armenian and Syriac Rites. He reminded the missionaries that they were converting people from schism and heresy:

We also wanted to make clear to all the good will which the Apostolic See feels for Oriental Catholics in commanding them to observe fully their ancient rites which are not at variance with the Catholic religion or with propriety. The Church does not require schismatics to abandon their rites when they return to Catholic unity, but only that they forswear and detest heresy. Its great desire is for the preservation, not the destruction of different peoples – in short, that all may be Catholic rather than all become Latin.

Benedict XIV, however, echoing the words of Pope Gelasius I, universally banned the practice of females serving the priest at the altar, noting that the practice had spread to certain Oriental Rites.

==== Chinese rites and Indian rites ====
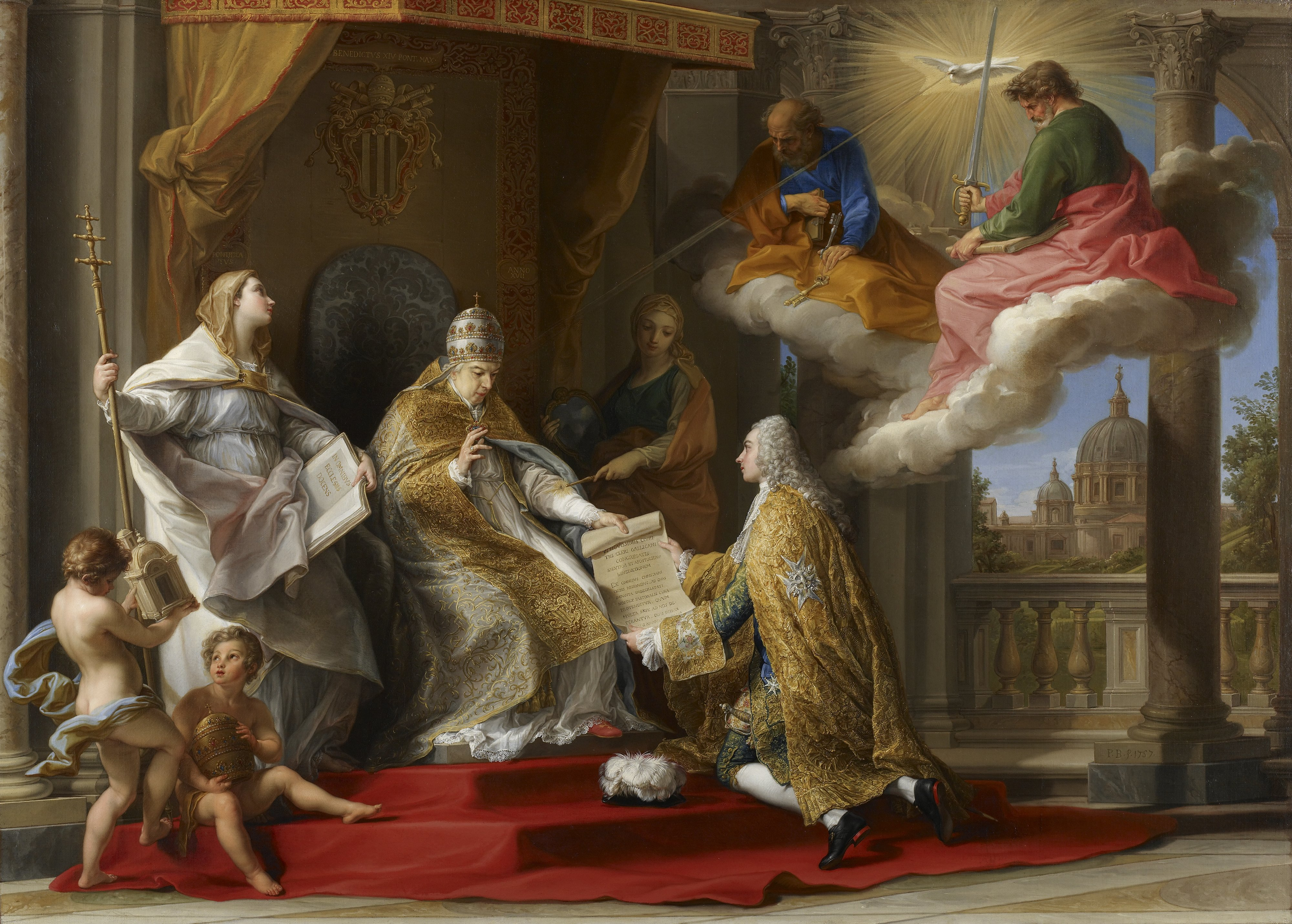
Benedict XIV presents his encyclical Ex Omnibus to the Comte de Stainville Étienne François, later the Duc de Choiseul.

He had a very active papacy, reforming the education of priests, the calendar of feasts of the church, and many papal institutions. Perhaps the most important act of Benedict XIV's pontificate was the promulgation of his famous laws about missions in the two bulls, Ex quo singulari (11 July 1742), and Omnium sollicitudinum (12 September 1744). In these bulls he ruled on the custom of accommodating non-Christian words and usages to express Christian ideas and practices of the native cultures, which had been extensively done by the Jesuits in their Indian and Chinese missions. An example of this is the statues of ancestors – there had long been uncertainty whether honour paid to one's ancestors was unacceptable 'ancestor worship,' or if it was something more like the Catholic veneration of the saints. This question was especially pressing in the case of an ancestor known not to have been a Christian. The choice of a Chinese translation for the name of God had also been debated since the early 17th century. Benedict XIV denounced these practices in these two bulls. The consequence of this was that many of these converts left the church.

During his papacy, Benedict XIV commissioned a team of architects, led by Nicola Salvi and Luigi Vanvitelli, to design a large palace that was to be 'more complex and with greater baroque style than the box of a palace Vanvitelli designed in Caserta'. The palace was to be built south of St. Peter's Basilica, but was never built, as the plans were quietly ignored by Benedict's successor, Clement XIII. They were brought up once more by Pius VI late in his papacy, but had to stop due to the possibility of invasion. On 15 December 1744, Benedict XIV blessed the baroque chapel (Chapel of St. John the Baptist) in Sant'Antonio dei Portoghesi in Rome, which featured mosaics on the sides, floor, and wall behind the altar made of semi-precious stones. The chapel, which had been commissioned by King John V of Portugal in 1740, was designed by Nicola Salvi and Luigi Vanvitelli. When complete, it was then shipped to Portugal to be placed in the Igreja de São Roque, the Jesuit church in Lisbon.

The Capuchins, under the leadership of Italian priest Giuseppe Maria Bernini, grew the community of Bettiah Christians in colonial India. He was invited to spread Catholic Christianity by Maharaja Dhurup Singh of the Bettiah Raj, an appointment that was blessed by Pope Benedict XIV on 1 May 1742 in a personal letter to the king.

==== Consistories ====
Benedict XIV created 64 cardinals in seven consistories; among the new cardinals he elevated into the cardinalate was Henry Benedict Stuart (1747). The pope also reserved one cardinal in pectore and revealed that name at a later time, therefore validating the creation.

==== Canonizations and beatifications ====
The pope canonized seven saints during his pontificate including Camillus de Lellis and Fidelis of Sigmaringen. He also beatified several individuals, including Niccolò Albergati.

==== Jubilee ====
On 5 May 1749, Pope Benedict XIV declared a Holy Year, to begin on Christmas Eve, 1749 and to extend throughout the next year until Christmas 1750. During the month of April 1750, 43,000 meals were served to the poor at the Trinita Hospital. Later that year, the Pope banned card games.

With the papal bull Peregrinantes, Benedict XIV convoked a Jubilee in 1750. Furthermore, the pope called upon Saint Leonard of Port Maurice to preach; both had a close relationship and the year previously saw Benedict XIV ask him to give sermons on penance and conversion in Rome. Among the initiatives that the pope designed for the Jubilee were the call for Christian unity and organizing for proper accommodation for those pilgrims who flocked to Rome.

Upon the advice of Saint Leonard, the pope was the first to institute the Via Crucis at the Colosseum, which he consecrated as a site of martyrdom for the early Christians. The pope placed the stations of the Cross in the arena, however, these were removed in 1874 before being restored in 1925.

=== Personality ===
Benedict XIV was considered one of the best scholars to have sat on the papal throne, noted for his keen intellect and his consistent morals. Noted for his modesty, Horace Walpole procured for the pope a statue of him with an accompanying plaque. When the copy of the inscription was forwarded to Rome for approval, Benedict XIV smiled upon reading it and, shaking his head, exclaimed: "Alas! I am like the statues of the Piazza San Pietro – admirable at a distance but monstrous when seen at close quarters!"

Benedict XIV was an avid gambler. He frequently used profane language, which one of his early biographers called "unfortunate phraseology." He had a crucifix placed in every room, and it is said that seeing it helped restrain his colorful language.

Benedict XIV was jovial and was lucid until the very end. To those who knew him, his blue eyes seemed to sparkle with humor and cordiality.

== Death and burial ==
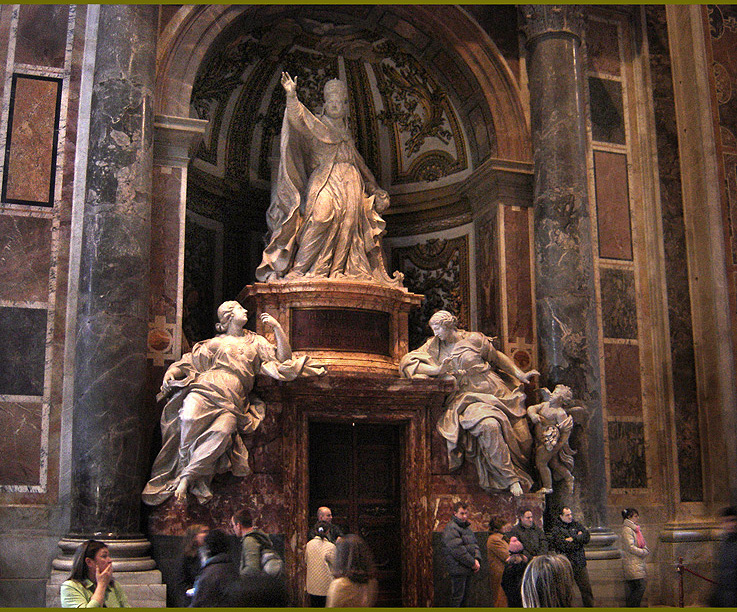
Tomb of Benedict XIV, St. Peter's Basilica

Benedict XIV had suffered from kidney problems for years. His health worsened in 1758 and, after a battle with gout, he died on 3 May 1758 at the age of 83. His final words to those surrounding him on his deathbed were "I leave you in the hands of God." Despite those words, the pope is alleged to have recited the famous Latin phrase "Sic transit gloria mundi" before poignantly adding "I now fall into silence and forgetfulness, the only place that belongs to me".

Benedict XIV originally demonstrated symptoms of illness on 26 April 1758 after having previously rallied from a serious illness that included gout that February. However, a contracted fever aggravated his asthma and he suffered from difficulties in urinating. However, his condition deteriorated rapidly in the following days after his gout and contracted kidney disease increased his sufferings. Despite this, his appetite had not diminished which was interpreted as a sign that he could potentially rally from his malady. However, into May, his condition had worsened considerably, though the pope remained lucid until the end, able to impart one last blessing before he died on 3 May.

Following his funeral, he was interred in Saint Peter's Basilica and a large catafalque was erected in his honour.

== See also ==
- Apostolicae Servitutis
- Cardinals created by Benedict XIV
- Castrato – Benedict XIV was one of the first popes to voice displeasure regarding the use of castrated males in church choir services. He did nothing, however, to stop the practice.
- List of encyclicals of Pope Benedict XIV
- List of popes
- Suppression of the Jesuits
- Encyclical Vix pervenit

== Notes ==
Catholic Church titles
Preceded by Jacopo Boncompagni	Archbishop of Bologna; 30 April 1731 – 17 August 1740	Succeeded by Vincenzo Malvezzi
Preceded by Clement XII	Pope; 17 August 1740 – 3 May 1758	Succeeded by Clement XIII
