= Primum Entertainment Group =

- Headquarters: New York City, NY; Rio de Janeiro, Brazil
- Industry: Entertainment
- Website: Primum Entertainment Group

Primum Entertainment Group is a media company involved in the production and distribution of filmed entertainment properties and live events in Latin America. Based in Rio de Janeiro, Brazil, Primum was founded in December 2008.

== Film Productions ==
At the Cannes Film Festival in May 2009, Primum Entertainment Group acquired the license to produce Rio, Eu Te Amo the next film in the series of Cities of Love motion pictures following Paris, je t'aime and New York, I Love You. This film is currently in development.
