= List of encyclicals of Pope Clement XIV =

1769 papal encyclicals

This article contains a list of encyclicals of Pope Clement XIV. The documents below were all written by Clement XIV.

No.	Title (Latin)	Title (English translation)	Subject	Date
1.	Decet quam maxime	"It Is Most Fitting"	Condemnation of certain abuses.	21 September 1769
2.	Cum summi apostolatus	"Since the Highest Apostolate"	Against the spread of dangerous ideas.	12 December 1769
3.	Inscrutabili Divinae Sapientiae	"Inscrutable Divine Wisdom"		12 December 1769
4.	Salutis Nostrae	"Of Our Salvation"		30 April 1774
