= António Pereira de Figueiredo =

Portuguese priest (1725 – 1797)

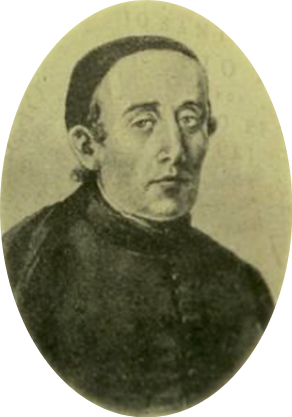

António Pereira de Figueiredo C.O. (February 14, 1725 – August 14, 1797) was a Portuguese priest, Latinist, theologian, philologist, and canonist. He is best known for his translation of the Vulgate into Portuguese.

== Biography ==
Born in Mação, Figueiredo studied Latin and music at a small school in Vila Viçosa. He then moved to Coimbra to continue his studies at the Monastery of the Holy Cross and later joined the Oratory of Saint Philip Nery, at one of whose houses he studied philosophy and rhetoric.

A staunch regalist, he collaborated with Marquis de Pombal in his struggle against the Jesuits, seeking to justify the Absolute Monarchy in his political writings. In 1768, he was appointed a member of the Real Mesa Censória (pt), a censorship body that took over the functions of the Holy Office in judging which books were allowed to circulate in the Kingdom of Portugal.

In 1753, Figueiredo published Novo Methodo da Grammatica Latina, a didactic work that proposed a simplified methodology for the study of Latin, which contrasted with that presented in Manuel Álvares' consecrated manual De institutione grammatica, then widely used in Jesuit schools. Six years later, he authored Os Elementos de Invenção e Locuçam Retorica, a compilation of lessons on rhetoric.

Figueiredo began translating the Bible as a well-established grammarian, in an undertaking that would take eighteen years to be completed. His translation, marked by a Baroque, highly literary style, was the first unabridged version of the Bible in Portuguese.
