= Apostolic letter =

Apostolic letter (Latin: littera apostolica) may refer to:

- New Testament epistles, which are:
  - the Pauline epistles
  - the Epistle to the Hebrews
  - the catholic epistles
- an ecclesiastical letter by the pope or in his name

== See also ==
- Apostolic constitution, a legislation by the pope
