= Censure (Catholic canon law) =

Spiritual punishment imposed by the Catholic Church

A censure, in the canon law of the Catholic Church, is a medicinal and spiritual punishment imposed by the Church on a baptized, delinquent, and contumacious individual. This punishment deprives the person, either wholly or partially, of certain spiritual goods until they resolve their contumacy. These spiritual goods may include access to the sacraments, participation in specific liturgical activities, and involvement in ecclesiastical functions.

Censures in the Catholic Church have their roots in ancient ecclesiastical practices and have evolved over centuries. They originated from the early Church's efforts to maintain order and discipline among its members. Throughout history, censures have been used to uphold the Church's teachings and values, promote repentance, and encourage spiritual growth.

== History and development ==
The term "censure" and its general concept trace back to the Roman Republic. In 311 A.U.C., the office of public censor (censores) was established. Their duties included maintaining a register (census) of all Roman citizens and their classification, such as senators or knights. They also had disciplinary authority over manners and morals, with the power to impose penalties, including the degradation of citizens from their social class for reasons affecting the state's moral or material welfare. This form of punishment was known as censure (censura). The Romans' strong emphasis on preserving the dignity of citizenship parallels the Church's concern for the purity and sanctity of its membership. In the early Church, members in good standing were listed in a register read at public gatherings, while those who were excommunicated were removed from this list. These registers, known as diptychs or canons, included the names of both living and deceased members. The Canon of the Mass retains elements of this ancient practice.

Initially, excommunication was the general term for all disciplinary measures used against delinquent Church members, with various forms corresponding to different levels of communion within Christian society. For example, grades among the laity included expiatores, pænitentes, and subdivisions like consistentes, substrati, audientes, and flentes or lugentes. Some Church goods, such as prayer, sacraments, attendance at the Holy Sacrifice, and Christian burial, were common to all members, while others were specific to various clerical grades. Deprivation of these rights resulted in excommunication, meaning exclusion from the communion appropriate to one's Church grade, either wholly or partially. (Note: (Bernardi, Com. in Jus Eccl., II, pt. II, diss. 3, cap. 5.)) In earlier ecclesiastical documents, terms like excommunication were not always synonymous with censure or a specific type of censure; they could also refer to penance or punishment in a broader sense.

In later Roman legal terminology (Codex Theod. I tit. I, 7 de off. rector. provinc.), the term "censure" came to denote punishment in a general sense. The Church adopted this terminology in its early years to describe various forms of punishment, including public penances, excommunications, and, for clerics, suspension or degradation. Like the Roman State, the Church viewed punishment not merely as inflicting suffering but as the deprivation of certain goods, rights, or privileges. In the Church's context, these were spiritual goods and graces, such as participation in prayer, the Holy Sacrifice, the sacraments, and the general communion of the Church, or, for clerics, the rights and honors associated with their office.

=== Legal developments of the Jus novum ===
Several centuries later, during the period of the Decretals, significant advancements were made in legal science. A distinction was established between the internal forum (relating to matters of sin and conscience) and the external forum (pertaining to the governance and discipline of the Church). The various types and nature of punishments were more clearly defined by commentators, judges, and legal scholars. By the beginning of the thirteenth century, although not explicitly stated in the Decretals, the term 'censure' had come to refer to a specific category of ecclesiastical penalties: interdict, suspension, and excommunication. Pope Innocent III, who in 1200 had used the term 'censure' for punishment in general, (Note: (cap. 13 X De judicious, II, 1)) later, in 1214, clarified its meaning in a response concerning ecclesiastical censure in pontifical documents. He formally distinguished censure from other ecclesiastical penalties, declaring that censure specifically referred to interdict, suspension, and excommunication. (Note: (cap. 20, X De verb, signif. V, 40))

Following this clarification, canonists began to differentiate between two types of punishments: medicinal or remedial (censures) and vindictive punishments. Censures were primarily aimed at correcting or reforming the offender and would cease once this objective was achieved. Vindictive punishments (poenæ vindicativæ), while not excluding the possibility of reforming the delinquent, were primarily intended to restore justice or societal order by imposing positive suffering. Examples of vindictive punishments include corporal or monetary penalties, imprisonment, life seclusion in a monastery, deprivation of Christian burial, and the deposition, degradation, or temporary suspension of clerics (e.g., suspension latæ sententiæ for a specified period, which St. Alphonsus Liguori considered a censure in certain cases). Confession penances are also considered vindictive punishments, as their primary purpose is to offer reparation for sins rather than reform the individual. Importantly, the irregularity arising from a crime is neither a censure nor a vindictive punishment; it is a canonical impediment that prevents individuals from fulfilling the sacred ministry, thus prohibiting the reception or exercise of holy orders.

The issue of censures underwent a significant change in 1418 with the Constitution Ad vitanda issued by Pope Martin V. Before this constitution, all censured persons who were publicly known were to be avoided (vitandi) and could not engage in religious or civil interaction (in divinis or in humanis). A censure, being a penal restriction on one's right to participate in certain spiritual goods of the Christian community, affected not only the individual under censure but also those who interacted with them in these spiritual matters. For instance, a suspended cleric was not permitted to participate in the sacraments or other religious services. However, Martin V's constitution specified that only those individuals who were explicitly and personally declared vitandi by judicial sentence would henceforth be treated as such. The Roman Inquisition clarified in 1884 that this formality was not required in the case of notorious excommunicates vitandi due to sacrilegious violence against clerics. Martin V's declaration was intended to benefit the broader community of the faithful, allowing them to interact with tolerated excommunicates (tolerati) as if they were not censured, due to the changing social conditions.

In 1869, Pope Pius X made substantial modifications to ecclesiastical discipline concerning censures through his constitution Apostolicae Sedis moderationi. This document abrogated many latæ sententiæ censures of common law, altered others, and created a new list of common law censures latæ sententiæ. These changes significantly reduced the number of such censures and adjusted the Church's disciplinary measures in response to evolving circumstances.

== Nature of the penalties ==
The Catholic Church believes that it receives the authority to enforce these conditions directly from Jesus Christ. It also asserts the right to establish disciplinary laws governing its members, a right that would be meaningless without the ability to enforce the observance of canonical laws. From its inception, the Church has exercised this authority to enforce its laws, as demonstrated by St. Paul’s actions against the incestuous Corinthian (Note: (I Cor. v, i sqq.)) and against Hymeneus and Alexander. (Note: (I Tim. i 20))

The Church's ultimate goal is the eternal salvation of the faithful (salus animarum lex suprema, "The salvation of souls is the supreme law" (Note: Cf. Canon 1752, 1983 Code of Canon Law.)). Therefore, in dealing with delinquent members, the Church primarily seeks their correction and reformation, aiming for the sinner’s return to God and the salvation of their soul. While this is the primary objective of Church penalties, other outcomes often follow, such as setting an example for the rest of the faithful and preserving Christian society. According to divine principles, God does not desire the death of the sinner but rather that they turn from their ways and live (Ezechiel, xviii, 23). Consequently, the Church prefers censures, which are medicinal or remedial in nature, over vindictive punishments, which are reserved for cases where little or no hope remains for the sinner’s reformation.

The primary and immediate goal of censures is to overcome contumacy or wilful stubbornness, guiding the offender to a better understanding of their spiritual condition. The secondary, more distant goal is to serve as a deterrent to other wrongdoers. Contumacy involves stubborn and defiant disobedience to laws, reflecting a contempt for authority, as it must not only violate the law but generally express disdain for the punishment or censure attached to it (Lehmkuhl, Cas. Consc., Freiburg, 1903, no. 984). Ignorance of the threatened punishment or grave fear would usually excuse someone from incurring a censure, as, under such circumstances, genuine contumacy cannot exist. Since contumacy implies persistent wrongdoing, an individual must not only commit a crime but continue in their wrongdoing after receiving due warning and admonition. This warning (monitio canonica) may come from the law itself or from an ecclesiastical superior or judge. Contumacy can thus occur in two ways: first, when a person ignores the warning from their ecclesiastical superior or judge, addressed personally; second, when an individual knowingly violates a Church law and the censure attached, with the law itself serving as a standing warning (Lex interpellat pro homine).

Censures, being the deprivation of grave spiritual benefits, are imposed on Christians only for sins that are both internally and externally grave, in genere suo (in their own kind), or those considered by the censure to be perfect and complete. There must be a proportionate relationship between the crime and the penalty. As medicinal remedies, censures do not deprive individuals of spiritual goods but only their use, and this only temporarily, until the person repents—until they recover from their spiritual illness. Excommunication, the gravest of censures, is never imposed for a specific period. In contrast, suspension and interdict may, under certain conditions, be applied for a set time. The actual punishment of ecclesiastical censures lies in the deprivation of access to certain spiritual goods or benefits within the Church’s control, such as the sacraments, public prayers, indulgences, sacred functions, jurisdiction, ecclesiastical benefices, and offices. However, censures do not deprive individuals of grace or of the private prayers and good works of the faithful, as the eternal communion of saints remains intact due to the indelible character of baptism.

To distinguish between the effects of the three censures: Excommunication, which can be inflicted on clerics and laypersons, excludes individuals from the communion of the faithful and prohibits the use of all spiritual goods shared by members of the visible Church, whose visible head is the Roman Pontiff. Suspension, applied only to clerics, leaves them within the communion of the faithful but directly prohibits them from performing sacred functions as ministers (qua ministri) and strips them of some or all clerical rights, such as jurisdiction, hearing confessions, and holding office. Interdict prevents clerics or laypersons from passively accessing certain ecclesiastical goods related to sacred matters (res sacræ) or communal participation, such as receiving certain sacraments or Christian burial.

== Division ==
=== Censures a jure and ab homine ===
In addition to the specific division of censures into excommunication, suspension, and interdict, there are several general classifications of censures. First, there are censures a jure and ab homine. Censures a jure (by the law) are those imposed by a permanent edict of the lawgiver, meaning they are attached to a crime by the law itself. Here, it is important to distinguish between a law, which is an enactment with permanent and perpetual binding force, and a mere command or precept, which is usually temporary in obligation and lapses with the death of the superior who issued it. Censures a jure, therefore, are attached either to the common law of the Church, such as decrees of popes and general councils, or are imposed by general law, for example, by bishops for their specific diocese or territory, usually in provincial or diocesan synods.

On the other hand, censures ab homine (by man) are those imposed by the sentence, command, or specific precept of a judge, such as a bishop, in contrast to the law mentioned above. These censures are generally due to particular and temporary circumstances and are meant to last only as long as those circumstances persist. A censure ab homine may take the form of a general order, command, or precept that applies to all subjects (per sententiam generalum), or it may be issued through a specific command or precept for an individual case, such as during a trial when the offender is found guilty and censured, or as a particular directive to prevent a specific offense.

=== Censures latæ sententiæ and ferendæ sententiæ ===
Another important and unique division of censures within the Church’s penal legislation is the distinction between a jure and ab homine censures, which may be classified as either (1) latæ sententiæ or (2) ferendæ sententiæ.

(1) Censures latæ sententiæ (of sentence pronounced) are incurred ipso facto by the mere commission of the crime. In other words, the delinquent automatically incurs the penalty upon breaking the law, and the censure binds the conscience immediately, without the need for a trial or judicial sentence. The law itself enforces the penalty the moment the violation is complete. This kind of penalty is particularly effective in the Church, where the faithful are morally bound to obey its laws. If the crime is secret, the censure remains secret but is binding before God and in conscience. If the crime is public, the censure is also public. However, if a secret censure is to be made public, a judicial investigation of the crime must take place, followed by a formal declaration (declaratory sentence) confirming that the delinquent has incurred the censure.

(2) Censures ferendæ sententiæ (of sentence awaiting pronouncement) are connected to the law or precept in such a way that the delinquent does not incur the penalty until it is formally imposed following a legal process, by means of a judicial or condemnatory sentence. Whether a censure is latæ sententiæ or ferendæ sententiæ can be determined from the wording of the law. The most common terms used for latæ sententiæ censures include: ipso facto, ipso jure, eo ipso sit excommunicatus, etc. On the other hand, if the wording implies future judicial action, the censure is ferendæ sententiæ (e.g., excommunicetur, suspenditur). In cases of doubt, the censure is presumed to be ferendæ sententiæ, as in penal matters, the more lenient interpretation is favored. Furthermore, before ferendæ sententiæ censures can be imposed, three warnings (monitiones) are required, or one peremptory warning, except when both the crime and the contumacy of the delinquent are notorious and sufficiently proven.

Censures are also divided into reserved and non-reserved. Just as sins can be reserved, so too can censures. In this case, reservation refers to the restriction or denial of an inferior’s jurisdiction to absolve the censure, with the power to absolve retained by a superior.

== Requirements for censures ==
For the infliction of censures, whether a jure or ab homine, the following are required:

1. Jurisdiction in the legislature or the judge;
2. Sufficient cause;
3. Correct method of procedure.

As for jurisdiction, since censures belong to the external forum or external governance of the Church, it naturally follows that jurisdiction, or the power to act in this forum, is necessary for their imposition, either by law or by a judge. Moreover, there must be a sufficient cause for the infliction of a censure. A censure, as a sanction of the law, is an accessory to the law. Therefore, a substantial defect in the law, such as injustice or unreasonableness, which modifies the law, also nullifies the censure attached to it. This sufficient cause for a censure may be lacking in the law either because the legal order was not observed during its formulation or because the offence addressed by the law was not grave enough to justify ecclesiastical censure. The penalty must be proportional to the crime. If the legal order was observed in the legislative act but the punishment was disproportionate to the crime, i.e., if the offence did not warrant the extreme penalty attached to the law, then, as the law consists of two parts, the precept is sustained, but the penalty or censure is not. (Note: (Suarez Disp. IV, sect. VI, no. 10)) In cases of doubt, both the law and the penalty are presumed to be valid.

As for the correct procedure, a censure sentence may be void if any substantial procedural rule is not followed, such as the warnings required for censures inflicted ab homine. However, the censure remains valid if there is any objective proportionality between the severity of the penalty and the severity of the offence, even if the sentence has some accidental defect, such as a censure imposed out of personal animosity towards a guilty individual or if another incidental procedural rule is not observed.

A question arises regarding censures that are invalid in foro interno ("in the internal forum") or according to truth but valid in foro externo or according to the presumption of law. For example, if a person is convicted of a crime in foro externo that carries a censure, but in their conscience, they know themselves to be innocent, what are the effects of the censure? Since they have been found guilty in foro externo, the censure has valid effects in that forum and must be observed externally to avoid scandal and maintain good discipline. All acts of jurisdiction in foro externo by such a censured individual could be declared invalid. However, in foro interno, they would retain jurisdiction, and if there were no scandal, they could act as though uncensured, without incurring the penalty for violating the censure, such as irregularity. A censure can also be imposed conditionally; if the condition is fulfilled, the censure is valid.

Can censures be imposed as vindictive penalties, that is, not primarily as remedial measures but rather to avenge a crime? This is a more serious question, and canonists have sought to answer it through the interpretation of certain legal texts, particularly from the Decretum of Gratian. (Note: (Eos qui rapiunt, Raptores.— Caus. XXXVI, Q. 2, c. 1, 2, Si quis episcopus, Caus. XXVII, Q. 1, c. 6, etc.)) However, these laws pertain to an earlier discipline of censures, when the term was used to refer to punishments in general, without a specific meaning. Thus, the solution must now be found in positive law. The law of the Decretals does not provide an explicit answer to the question, although the different types of penalties are more clearly distinguished therein. In later law, the Council of Trent (Sess. XXV, c. iii, De ref.) wisely advised bishops that the sword of censures should be used sparingly and with great caution. Censures, being essentially a deprivation of the use of spiritual goods or benefits, are to be imposed medicinally and should be lifted as soon as the offender abandons their contumacy.

As mentioned earlier, St. Alphonsus and subsequent authors argue that censures may, secondarily, have a punitive and deterrent purpose, and from this perspective, they may be imposed for a specific period. This is true generally, though it is certain that excommunication can never be imposed as a vindictive punishment. However, suspension and interdict may be imposed, albeit rarely and for a short time, as vindictive penalties under positive law. The reason for this is that suspension and interdict do not, like excommunication, expel the offender from the communion of the faithful, nor do they deprive them entirely of all spiritual goods. Therefore, for serious reasons, these censures may take on the nature of vindictive penalties. This is particularly the case when their effect is the deprivation of some temporal right, such as when a cleric is suspended from their office or benefice. In such cases, the censures are more akin to punishments properly so called, rather than censures, whose primary nature is the deprivation of the use of spiritual goods. (Note: (Suarez, op. cit., disp. IV, sect. V, 29-30))

== Subject of censures, active and passive ==
As regards the active subject of censures, i.e., who can impose them, censures belong to the external governance of the Church. Therefore, they can only be inflicted by those who possess proper jurisdiction in the Church's external forum. Censures a jure, i.e., those incorporated into laws binding on Christian society, either in whole or in part, can be imposed by those with the power to legislate. For instance, the pope or a general council can impose such censures on the entire world, the Roman congregations within their respective spheres, the bishop within his diocese, the chapter or vicar capitular during the vacancy of a see (sede vacante), regular prelates with external jurisdiction, legates of the Holy See, and chapters of regulars over their own subjects. However, parish priests, abbesses, and secular judges do not have such authority. Censures ab homine, or those imposed by an ecclesiastical judge, whether the judge's jurisdiction is ordinary or delegated, can be inflicted to enforce a specific law or to prevent certain evils. Vicars-general and delegated judges, lacking legislative power, can only impose censures ab homine, not a jure, in order to uphold and protect their authority, such as enforcing the execution of a judicial decree.

Censures, being spiritual punishments, can only be imposed on Christians, i.e., baptized persons. Additionally, since they are punishments, they can only be inflicted on subjects of the superior imposing the censure. Such subjection may arise from domicile, quasi-domicile, or by reason of the crime committed (ratione delicti). Pilgrims who violate a particular law are not subject to censure, but if they transgress a common law with a censure ferendæ sententiæ attached, the local bishop may impose it on them. Cardinals and bishops are exempt from censures a jure (except excommunication) unless the law explicitly mentions them. The pope alone has the authority to judge heads of state.

Kings and sovereigns cannot be censured by bishops, nor can they excommunicate communities or chapters. However, a community may be subjected to interdict and suspension. In such cases, this would not be a censure in the proper sense but rather a penal deprivation; once a person ceases to be a member of the community, they would no longer be subject to the penalty.

== Absolution from censures ==
All canonists agree that a censure, once incurred, can only be lifted through absolution. Although censures are medicinal punishments intended to overcome obstinacy, they do not cease immediately upon repentance. Since the imposition of a censure is a judicial act, judicial absolution is required, and it must be lawfully granted when there is true amendment. Even the death of the censured person, if excommunicated or interdicted, does not remove the censure, as some effects, such as the denial of Christian burial, may still remain. Formal absolution is not required only when a censure is imposed with a conditio resolutiva, such as suspension contingent upon completing a certain act. When suspension or interdict are imposed as vindictive punishments, they may expire not through absolution, but by the passage of the time for which they were inflicted. Censures themselves, if not yet incurred, may cease by the abrogation of the law to which they were attached, by revocation, or (typically) by the death of the superior if the censure was imposed ab homine as a particular precept.

Absolution, which involves the removal or relaxation of the penalty by a competent authority, is an act of justice and is a res favorabilis in censures; hence, it cannot be denied to a penitent censured person. It may be granted in two ways: (1) In the internal forum, i.e., for sin and hidden censure. This can be given by any priest with the necessary jurisdiction, either in confession or outside of confession in the forum of conscience (forum conscientiæ). In both cases, the sacramental formula referring to censures is used. (2) In the forum externum, absolution can only be granted by those with the required judicial power, such as the person who imposed the censure, their successor, delegate, or superior (e.g., the pope). The formula used may be either the solemn or shorter version, depending on the situation; both are found in the Roman Ritual. Absolution can be given either unconditionally or conditionally, depending on the fulfillment of a condition for its validity. It is also given ad cautelam (for safety) in all rescripts, Bulls, and Apostolic privileges to ensure that the effects of the concession are not impeded by some hidden censure. Additionally, there is absolution ad reincidentiam, which takes immediate effect but results in the person incurring, ipso facto, the same kind of censure from which they were just absolved if they fail to do something prescribed within a certain time. The person who removes the censure may impose the reincidentia. Today, reincidentia is only ab homine, meaning that it must be applied by the person absolving (Lega, lib II, vol. III, nos. 130–31).

Regarding the minister of absolution, i.e., who can absolve from censures, the general principle is: "only he can loose who can bind" (illius est solvere cujus est ligare), meaning that only those with the necessary jurisdiction can grant absolution. This jurisdiction may be either ordinary or delegated. In the case of censures ab homine, imposed by particular sentence or by precept, or reserved censure a jure, only the person who imposed the censure, or their successor, superior, or delegate, can grant absolution. Therefore, a vicar capitular can absolve censures imposed by the ordinary power of a late bishop, having succeeded to the power held by the deceased prelate. In terms of the power of a superior, the pope, as the universal superior, can always remove censures imposed by his inferiors, such as bishops. An archbishop, however, is not the absolute superior of his suffragans and can only remove censures imposed by them during visitation or in the case of an appeal. When a superior absolves a censure imposed by an inferior, they must always notify the inferior and require the delinquent to offer full satisfaction. The extent of the power of a delegated judge to grant absolution must be explicitly stated in their letters.

When censures are imposed a jure communi or ab homine by a general sentence, if they are not reserved, any approved confessor with jurisdiction to absolve from sin may absolve from them in both the external and internal forums. The absolution granted in one forum is valid in the other, except when the censure is in the forum contentiosum, meaning it is already in litigation before a court; in this case, absolution in the internal forum would not be valid in the external forum. A priest who is not approved or does not have jurisdiction to hear confessions cannot absolve from censures, even if they are not reserved, except in danger of death. When censures are reserved a jure, only the person to whom they are reserved, or their superior, successor, or delegate, can grant absolution. Censures reserved to the pope are either reserved or reserved in a special manner. For the former, the Council of Trent (Sess. XXIV, c. vi, De ref.) established that a bishop, or someone delegated by him, may absolve in foro conscientiæ and in his diocese his subjects from these censures when the crime is hidden and not notorious or when it has not been brought before a judicial tribunal. By bishops, this also refers to abbots with ecclesiastical territory, vicars capitular, and others with episcopal jurisdiction, but not to vicars-general based on their general commission or regular prelates. The subjects who may receive these faculties are those who live in the bishop's diocese or outsiders who come to confession there, as they are considered subjects for the purpose of absolution. However, such absolution cannot be granted in foro externo, being limited to the forum conscientiæ, or the domain of conscience. If censures are specially reserved to the Roman Pontiff, a bishop cannot grant absolution by his ordinary power, except in cases of necessity. Special concessions for these cases are granted to bishops by the Holy See for a certain period, for the life of the bishop, or for a specified number of cases. Censures reserved by pontifical law to bishops or ordinaries may be absolved by all bishops, abbots, vicars capitular, and vicars-general in any forum, even in notorious cases. At the point of death (in articulo mortis), any priest, even one who is not approved, can absolve from all censures, and all absolutions from them are governed by the provisions of the papal Constitution Apostolicæ Sedis Moderationi (Pius IX, 1869). (Note: For serious changes in the method of absolution (in cases of necessity) from papal censures, owing to the decree of S. Cong. Inquis. (23 June 1886) and later interpretations, see Tanquery, Synop. Th. Mor., III (II), 1907, pp. 321-24, and Gury-Ferrères, Th. Mor., II, nn. 575-76.)

=== Conditions for absolution ===
These conditions apply to both the priest granting absolution and the person being absolved. The absolution given by a priest is invalid if it is obtained through coercion or if it is extorted by grave, unjust fear. Moreover, absolution would be invalid if it is granted based on a false, principal cause, for instance, if the judge absolves because it is falsely claimed that satisfaction has been made when it has not. The conditions for absolution are generally outlined in the formula injunctis de more injungendis, meaning enjoining what the law requires. These include:

1. Satisfaction to the offended party;
2. The delinquent must repair the scandal according to the prudent judgment of the bishop or confessor and remove any occasion of sin;
3. In cases where absolution is granted for censures specially reserved, the person must promise (in foro externo, under oath) to follow the Church's further directions on the matter (stare mandatis ecclesiæ);
4. For more serious crimes, an oath may be required to prevent reoffending;
5. Apart from the penance imposed in confession, the absolved person must undertake and complete another salutary penance as satisfaction for the fault.
