= Encyclical =

Doctrinal document in Christian churches

An encyclical is primarily associated with papal encyclicals in the Catholic Church, letters outlining the church's perspective on a topic. Still, it is also used among Anglicans and the Eastern Orthodox Church.

== Etymology ==
The term was originally a circular letter sent to all the churches of a particular area in the ancient Roman Church. At that time, the word could be used for a letter sent out by any bishop. The word comes from the Late Latin encyclios (originally from the Latin encyclius, a Latinization of Greek ἐγκύκλιος (enkyklios), meaning "circular", "in a circle", or "all-round", also part of the origin of the word encyclopedia).

== Catholic usage ==
Although the term "encyclical" originally meant a circulating letter, it acquired a more specific meaning within the Catholic Church. In 1740, Pope Benedict XIV wrote a letter titled Ubi primum, which is generally regarded as the first encyclical.

For the modern Catholic Church, a papal encyclical is a specific category of papal document, a kind of pastoral letter concerning Catholic doctrine, sent by the pope and usually addressed especially to patriarchs, primates, archbishops and bishops who are in communion with the Holy See. The form of the address can vary widely and may concern bishops in a particular area or designate a wider audience. Papal encyclicals usually take the form of a papal brief because of their more personal nature as opposed to the formal papal bull.

Like most papal documents, the title of the encyclical is usually taken from its first few words (its incipit). They are usually written in Latin unless particularly addressed to the Bishops or the church of one region. Titles are generally written in sentence case, as is typical for Latin. Papal encyclicals not in Latin include the 1892 French Au milieu des sollicitudes to rally French Catholics to accept the legitimacy of the French Third Republic; the 1931 Italian Non abbiamo bisogno against Italian fascist suppression of groups like Catholic Action; and the 1937 German Mit brennender Sorge against the Nazi idolization of race and nation. In recent decades, popes prefer addressing local churches with apostolic letters or exhortations instead of encyclicals, though even those are rare. Pope Francis' Laudato si' and Fratelli tutti were addressed to the universal Church, yet used non-Latin titles despite their editio typica (authoritative versions published in the Acta Apostolicae Sedis) being in Latin because their incipits were quotes from the medieval Italian works of the saint that Pope Francis named his pontificate after, St. Francis of Assisi. In 2025, Pope Leo XIV clarified in his promulgation of the Regolamento Generale della Curia Romana (Regulations Governing the Roman Curia) that curial institutions shall draft their acts in Latin or another language, formalizing the contemporary practice of drafting documents such as encyclicals in vernacular languages. Some non-regional encyclicals drafted in modern languages are Pacem in terris in Italian; Fratelli tutti and Dilexit nos in Spanish; and Populorum progressio in French.

=== Papal use ===
In the encyclical Humani generis, Pope Pius XII held that papal encyclicals, even when they are of ordinary magisterium, can nonetheless be sufficiently authoritative to end theological debate on a particular question:

It is not to be thought that what is set down in Encyclical letters does not demand assent in itself, because in this the popes do not exercise the supreme power of their magisterium. For these matters are taught by the ordinary magisterium, regarding which the following is pertinent: "He who heareth you, heareth Me." (Luke 10:16); and usually what is set forth and inculcated in Encyclical Letters, already pertains to Catholic doctrine. But if the Supreme Pontiffs in their acts, after due consideration, express an opinion on a hitherto controversial matter, it is clear to all that this matter, according to the mind and will of the same Pontiffs, cannot any longer be considered a question of free discussion among theologians.

== Anglican usage ==
Amongst Anglicans, the term encyclical was revived in the late 19th century. It is applied to circular letters issued by the English primates.

== Eastern Orthodox usage ==
In Eastern Orthodoxy encyclicals can be issued by the Patriarch of Constantinople, Synods of Bishops, and even by individual bishops.

=== Important Eastern Orthodox encyclicals ===
- Encyclical of the Eastern Patriarchs (1848)
- Patriarchal encyclical of 2012

== See also ==
- Apostolic constitution
- Apostolic exhortation
- Ecclesiastical letter
- Apostolic letter (disambiguation)

== Sources ==
- The Oxford Dictionary of the Christian Church (3rd. ed.), p. 545.
