= Catholic Church in the United States =

Catholic Church in the United States
- Latin: Ecclesia Catholica in Civitatibus Foederatis
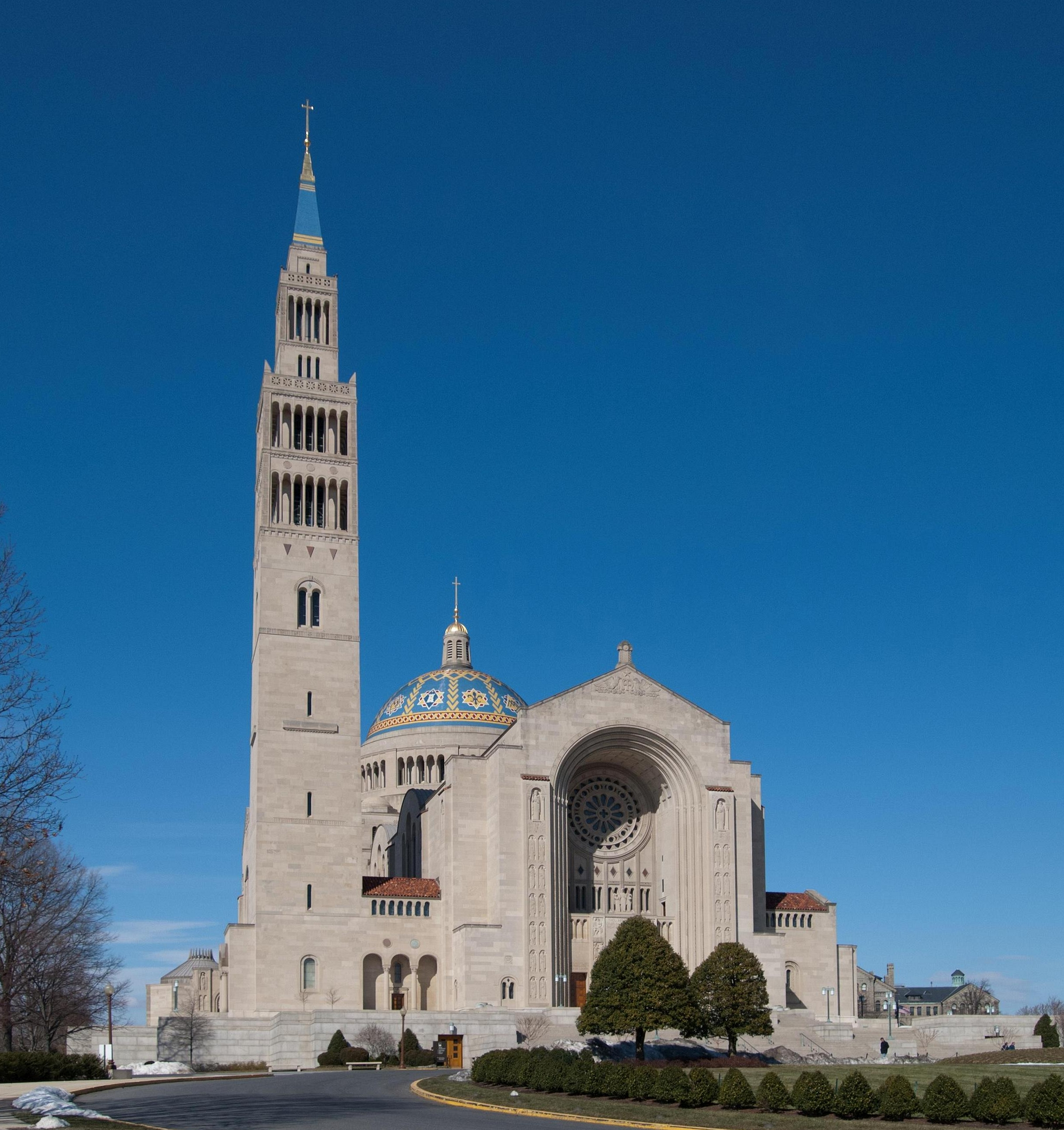
- Basilica of the National Shrine of the Immaculate Conception in Washington, D.C., the largest Catholic church in North America
- Type: National polity
- Classification: Catholic
- Orientation: Latin and Eastern
- Scripture: Bible
- Theology: Catholic theology
- Polity: Episcopal
- Governance: United States Conference of Catholic Bishops
- Pope: Leo XIV
- USCCB President: Paul Coakley
- Prerogative of Place: William E. Lori
- Apostolic Nuncio: Gabriele Caccia
- Region: United States and other territories of the United States, excluding Puerto Rico.
- Language: English, Spanish, French, Latin
- Congregations: 16,429 (2022)
- Members: 72,000,000+ (2020)
- Official website: www.usccb.org

In the United States, the Catholic Church is the largest single Christian denomination and the second-largest religious tradition after Protestantism. As of 2024, an estimated 19% to 22% of the adult population in the U.S. identifies as Catholic. The United States has the fourth-largest Catholic population in the world, following Brazil, Mexico, and the Philippines. Catholicism has had a significant cultural, social, and institutional presence in the United States, reflected in its parishes, schools, universities, hospitals, charitable organizations, and participation in public life.

Catholicism first entered the territories that would become the United States through Spanish colonization, with the earliest documented Mass celebrated in 1526 by Dominican friars, and through French colonization. More than any other empire, the French claimed and assumed vast stretches of the continent, notably the Great Lakes regions and the Mississippi Valley, which included Louisiana. During the colonial era, Maryland was founded as an English colony with a notable Catholic presence that included, Leonard Calvert, the younger brother of the colony's "Catholic proprietor," contrasting with the predominantly Protestant colonies of Massachusetts and Virginia. Pennsylvania's policy of religious toleration also attracted Catholic settlers. Early Catholic communities were concentrated mainly in Maryland, Pennsylvania, and New York. Anti-Catholic sentiment persisted in several colonies, shaped by the sectarian divisions of the English Civil War and the influence of Puritanism.

During the American Revolution, Catholics served in the Continental Army, and some served in political and military roles, most notably Charles Carroll of Carrollton. The revolutionary government maintained an alliance with France and Spain, predominantly Catholic nations, who contributed troops, naval support, and financial assistance to the American cause. George Washington, an Anglican, publicly supported religious toleration; as both general and president, he attended services of various Christian denominations, including Catholic liturgies, and issued statements affirming the civil rights and religious freedom of Catholics.

Beginning in the 1840s, large waves of immigrants from Ireland, southern Germany, and other predominantly Catholic regions and countries contributed to rapid growth in the Catholic population, making Catholicism the largest single Christian denomination in the United States by the late 19th century. Additional Catholic populations entered the country as former Spanish territories were incorporated into the United States. By the early 20th century, roughly one-sixth of the U.S. population was Catholic. Throughout American history, anti-Catholic movements—including the Know Nothing movement in the 1840s, the American Protective Association in the 1890s, and the second Ku Klux Klan in the 1920s—periodically targeted Catholics. In the late 20th century, the Catholic Church in the United States faced renewed scrutiny due to revelations of clerical sexual abuse and institutional responses to those cases.

== History ==
=== Early colonial period ===
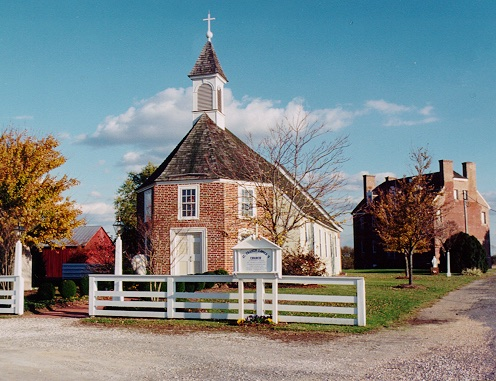
St. Francis Xavier Church in Compton, Maryland, the oldest Catholic church in continuous operation from the Thirteen Colonies

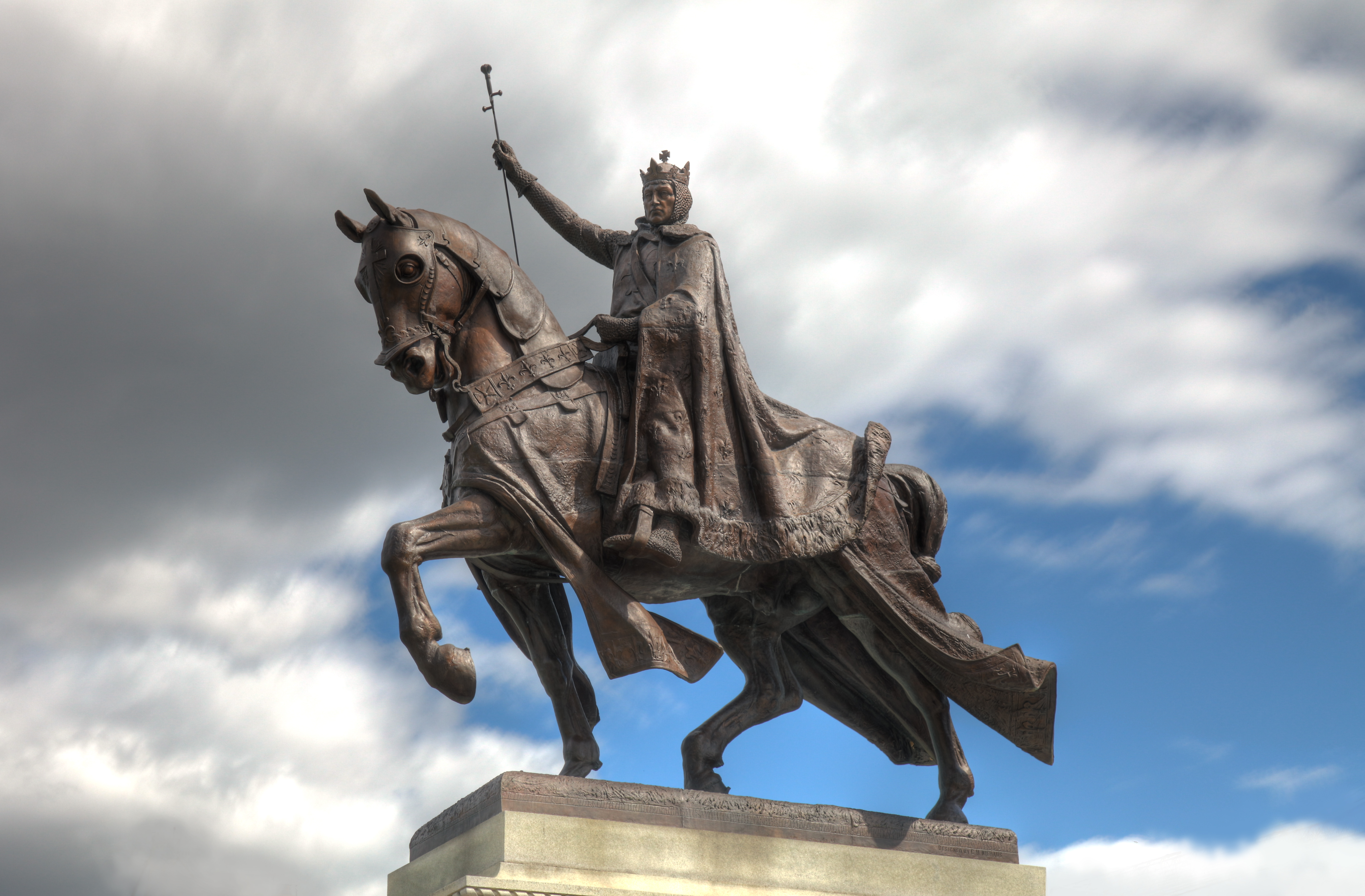
Apotheosis of St. Louis in St. Louis

Catholicism first entered the territories that would become the United States through Spanish colonization. Spanish expeditions brought Catholic clergy to the present-day Virgin Islands in 1493, Puerto Rico in 1508, Florida in 1513, and later to regions of the Southeast and the Southwest. The earliest documented Catholic Mass within what is now the United States was celebrated in 1526 by Dominican friars Antonio de Montesinos and Anthony de Cervantes for the short-lived San Miguel de Gualdape colony. Spanish missions, including those established in Alta California beginning in 1769, left a lasting religious and cultural legacy. Until the 19th century, missionary activity in these regions operated under Spanish—and, in some areas, Portuguese—colonial authority.

In the British colonies, Maryland was founded in the 17th century as a proprietary colony with a notable English Catholic presence, contrasting with the predominantly Protestant colonies of Massachusetts and Virginia. The colony was named for Queen Henrietta Maria, the Catholic wife of King Charles I, and was influenced by prominent Catholic families such as the Calverts and the Carrolls. Religious tensions in the Thirteen Colonies reflected the sectarian divisions of the English Civil War, contributing to persistent anti‑Catholic sentiment. Maryland's founders sought to provide a refuge for Catholics who faced legal and social restrictions in England.

Pennsylvania, granted to William Penn by King James II, adopted a policy of religious toleration that attracted settlers of various Christian traditions, including Catholics. Catholics were also present in the Province of New York, named after James II, the last Catholic monarch of England. By 1785, the estimated Catholic population in the United States was approximately 25,000, concentrated mainly in Maryland (15,800), Pennsylvania (7,000), and New York (1,500), served by only 25 priests—less than 2% of the total population of the Thirteen Colonies.

Following the Declaration of independence in 1776 and the American victory in the Revolutionary War, the new United States incorporated territories with longstanding Catholic histories under the former colonial administrations of New France and New Spain. As the nation expanded westward, many regions that became part of the United States had been predominantly Catholic during their earlier colonial periods.

=== Founding of the United States ===
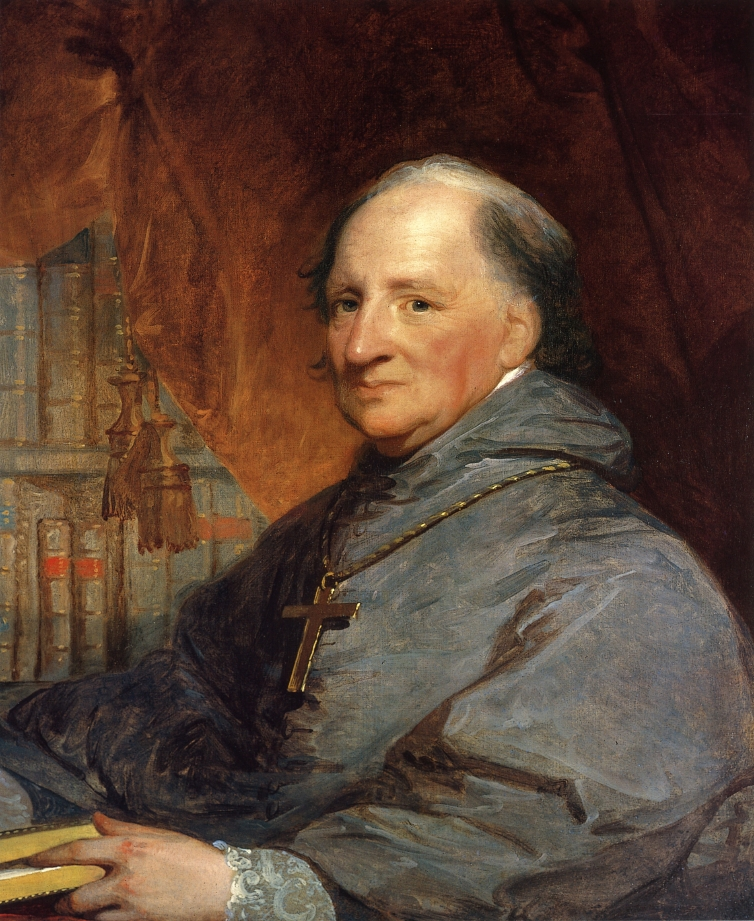
Portrait of John Carroll, first Catholic bishop of the United States, appointed to the Diocese of Baltimore by Pius VI in 1789.

Anti-Catholicism was a defining feature of early English settlement in New England and persisted throughout periods of conflict with Catholic New France. Maryland, founded in 1632 under the proprietorship of Lord Baltimore, was established as a colony intended to accommodate English Catholics. Its early policy of religious toleration, however, was repeatedly disrupted. In 1650, Puritan settlers in Maryland repealed the colony's Act of Toleration, outlawed Catholicism, and expelled Catholic clergy. The act was reinstated in 1658, but another rebellion in 1689 again ended toleration, and the colonial assembly—dominated by Anglicans—established the Church of England and barred Catholics and Quakers from holding public office. In contrast, New York under Governor Thomas Dongan, a Catholic, maintained comparatively broader religious tolerance. Widespread legal restrictions on Catholics in the colonies began to diminish only with the American Revolution.

By the mid-18th century, Catholics remained a smaller minority. A Catholic Maryland official in 1756 estimated approximately 7,000 practicing Catholics in Maryland and 3,000 in Pennsylvania. The Colonial Williamsburg Foundation estimates that by 1765 Maryland had about 20,000 Catholics and Pennsylvania about 6,000, within total colonial populations of roughly 180,000 and 200,000 respectively. At the start of the American Revolution in 1776, Catholics represented about 1.6% of the population—around 40,000 people in the Thirteen Colonies—with only about 25 priests serving them. Another estimate places the Catholic population at 35,000 in 1789, with roughly 60% residing in Maryland and only about 30 priests nationwide. In 1785, John Carroll, later the first Catholic bishop in the United States, reported 24,000 registered communicants, 90% of whom lived in Maryland and Pennsylvania.

After independence, the Holy See reorganized Catholic governance in the United States, establishing a new ecclesiastical structure under American leadership. Catholics served in the Continental Army, and the new nation maintained close ties with Catholic France, whose military and financial support was crucial to the American victory. George Washington emphasized religious toleration, prohibiting anti‑Catholic celebrations such as "Pope’s Day" in 1775 and attending services of various Christian denominations, including Catholic liturgies. Several European Catholics played significant military roles in the Revolution, including the Marquis de Lafayette, the Comte de Rochambeau, the Comte d’Estaing, Casimir Pulaski, and Tadeusz Kościuszko. Irish‑born Commodore John Barry, often credited as a founder of the U.S. Navy, also contributed prominently. Washington later acknowledged the contributions of Catholic leaders and France's support in a letter to John Carroll.

Beginning around 1780, disputes arose between lay trustees and clergy over control of church property, a conflict that diminished after the Plenary Councils of Baltimore in 1852 affirmed episcopal authority. Historian Jay Dolan notes that the Revolution transformed the status of Catholics, who had previously faced political, professional, and social discrimination; new state constitutions and the federal Constitution prohibited religious tests and expanded civil rights. Washington's public support for religious liberty reinforced these developments, and states gradually repealed remaining colonial‑era restrictions on Catholics.

Catholics also participated in the framing of the new republic. Daniel Carroll and Thomas Fitzsimons served as delegates to the Constitutional Convention in 1787. John Carroll was appointed Prefect Apostolic by the Vatican, oversaw the early organization of the American Catholic Church, developed plans for Georgetown University, and became the first bishop in the United States in 1789.

In 1791, the first diocesan synod of Baltimore, also called the Catholic National Synod, was held under Bishop John Carroll. In the year following the synod, some of the first American-made prayer books were published, such as The Pious Guide to Prayer and Devotion.

=== 19th century ===
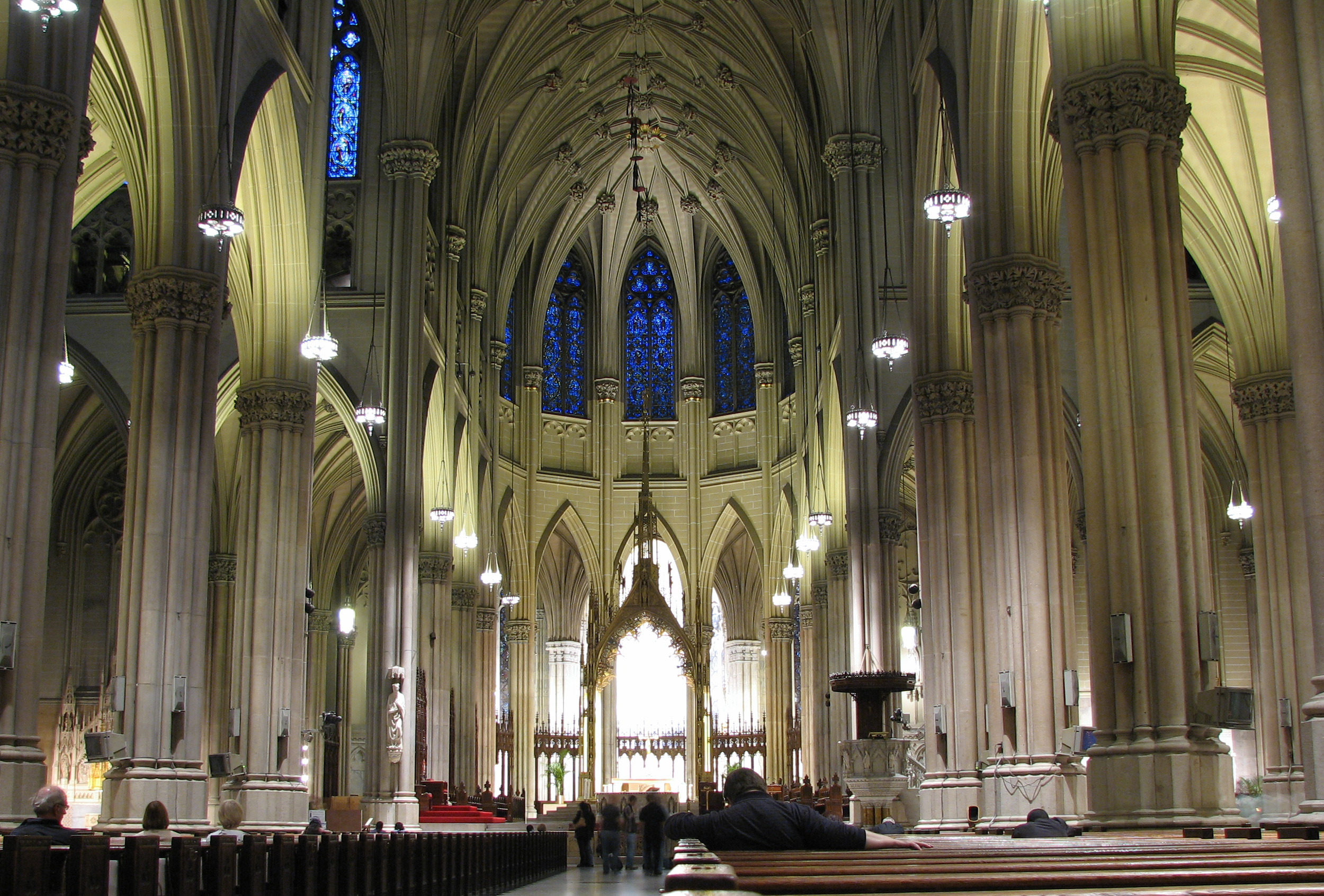
The nave of the St. Patrick's Cathedral in New York City, completed in 1878

Catholicism spread throughout America with the territorial gains from the French and Spanish Empires, including the annexation of Mexican lands. The Louisiana Purchase in 1803 transformed the vast territories of French Louisiana into American states. The colony's descendants, today known as the Louisiana Creole and Cajun people, came from a culturally Catholic and French population. During the 19th century, previously Spanish territories became territories of the United States, starting with Florida in the 1820s, then parts of Mexico on the border, and the annexation of Mexico after the Mexican–American War; this land acquisition, known as the Mexican Cession, caused the new states of California, Nevada, Utah, most of Arizona, New Mexico, Colorado, and Wyoming to form. Both French and the Spanish also named numerous settlements after Catholic saints. Following the Spanish-American War in 1898, the United States took control of Puerto Rico, Guam, the Philippines, and Cuba for a time, which all held Spanish Catholic colonial history. However, they were not made into states.

During an immigration surge starting in the 1840s, Catholic German, Irish, and European immigrants arrived in large numbers, and after 1890, Italians and Poles formed the largest Catholic group. Many European countries contributed to this wave of Catholic immigration, including Quebec. Catholics had become the country's biggest denomination by 1850. Between 1860 and 1890, the population tripled to seven million.

==== Catholic revival and anti-Catholic movements ====
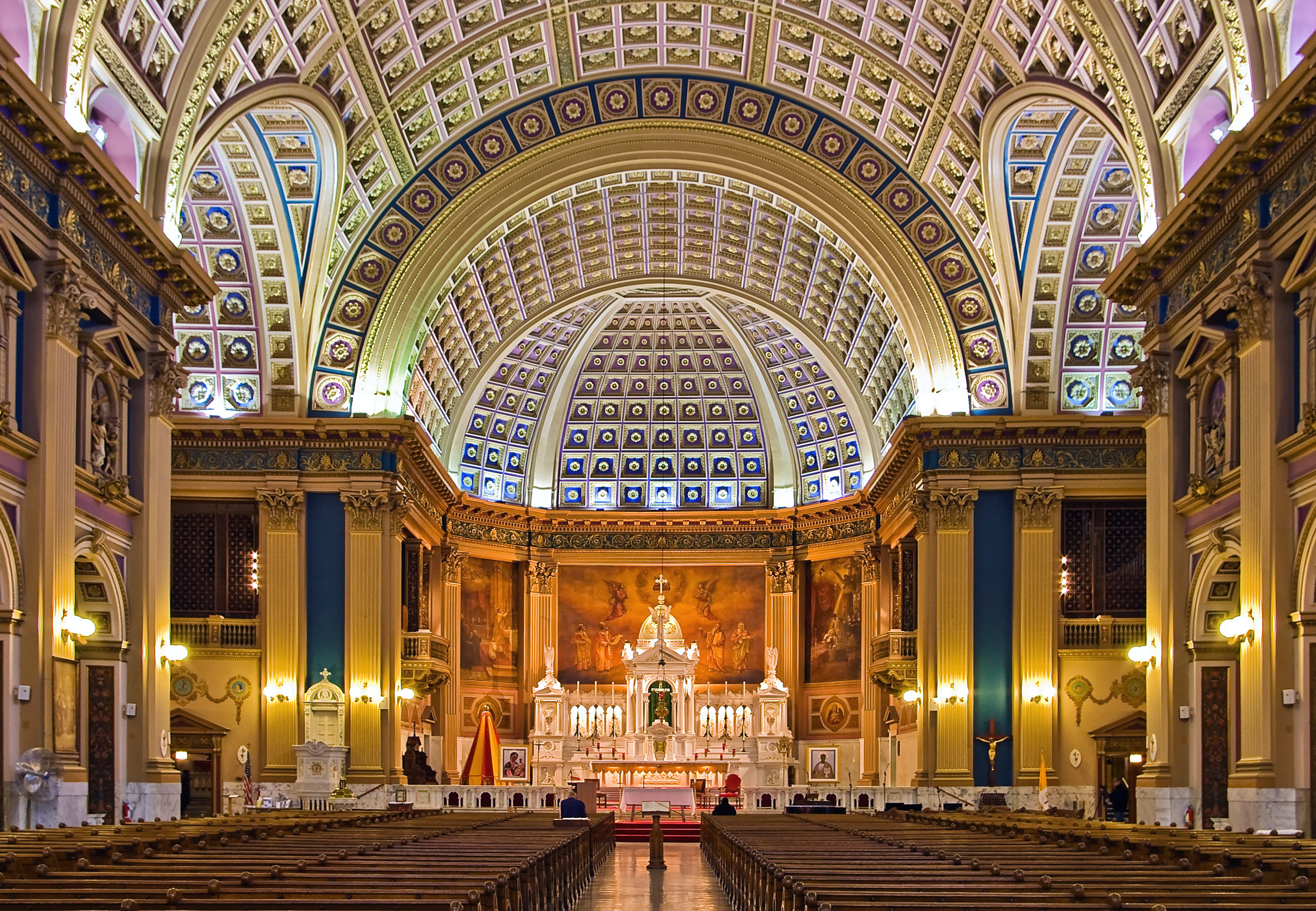
The Basilica of Our Lady of Sorrows in Chicago

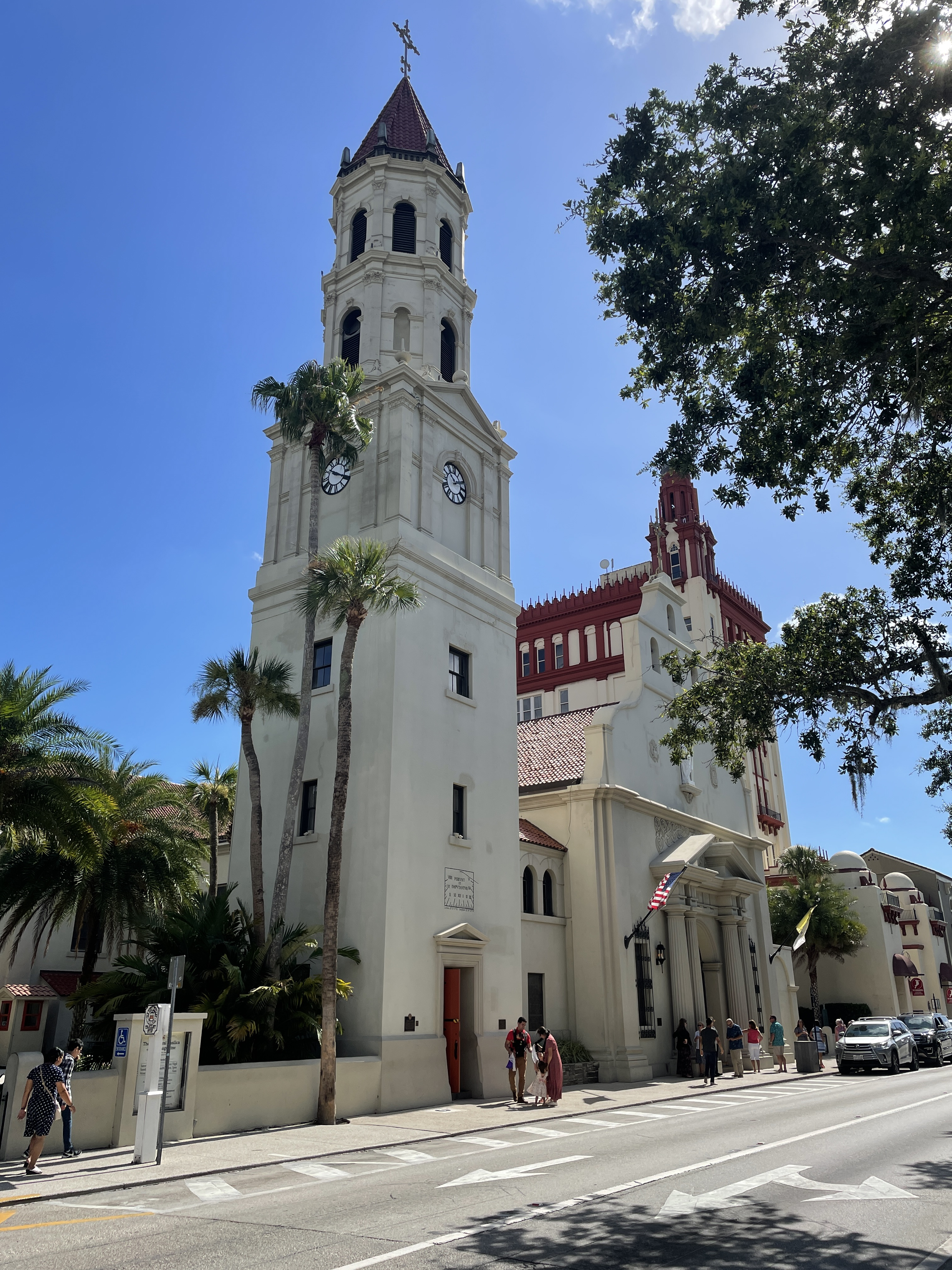
18th century New Spanish Cathedral Basilica of St. Augustine in St. Augustine, Florida

Historian John McGreevy identifies a 19th-century Catholic revival in the United States shaped by Ultramontanism, a movement emphasizing strong loyalty to Rome, increased episcopal authority, and renewed devotional practices. This revival developed within urban parishes, schools, and lay associations, and it encouraged more frequent participation in the sacraments, deference to bishops and the pope, and pastoral discouragement of intermarriage with Protestants. Leadership within the American hierarchy increasingly reflected the influence of Irish-born clergy, who generally aligned with broader Ultramontane trends. American bishops, many of them Irish, tended to support the international Ultramontane movement that culminated in the First Vatican Council's definition of papal infallibility in 1870, though the council's outcome was shaped primarily by European theological and political dynamics.

The Plenary Councils of Baltimore in 1852, 1866, and 1884 standardized discipline within the American Church and played a central role in shaping national Catholic life. The Third Plenary Council commissioned the Baltimore Catechism and endorsed the establishment of the Catholic University of America, which was chartered in 1887. Jesuits—including some who had previously faced suppression in Europe—founded or strengthened several American secondary schools and universities, and other religious communities such as the Dominicans, the Congregation of Holy Cross, and the Franciscans also established major educational institutions.

In the 1890s, Vatican officials expressed concern that certain interpretations of Catholic thought in the United States reflected excessive liberalism, leading to what became known as the Americanism controversy. French cleric Charles Maignen criticized the ideas of Isaac Hecker, founder of the Paulist Fathers, accusing him of subjectivism and tendencies resembling Protestant individualism. Although the Vatican's concerns were directed at interpretations of Hecker's ideas rather than at Hecker himself, some of his supporters were labeled as proponents of "Americanism," a term later rejected by the American hierarchy.

Throughout American history, anti-Catholic movements have appeared: the 1850s American nativist political party Know Nothing, the 1890s anti-Catholic secret society American Protective Association, and the 1920s American white supremacist hate group Ku Klux Klan. Animosity from some Protestants waned as Catholics demonstrated their patriotism in World War I, commitment to charity, and dedication to democratic values.

==== Nuns and sisters ====
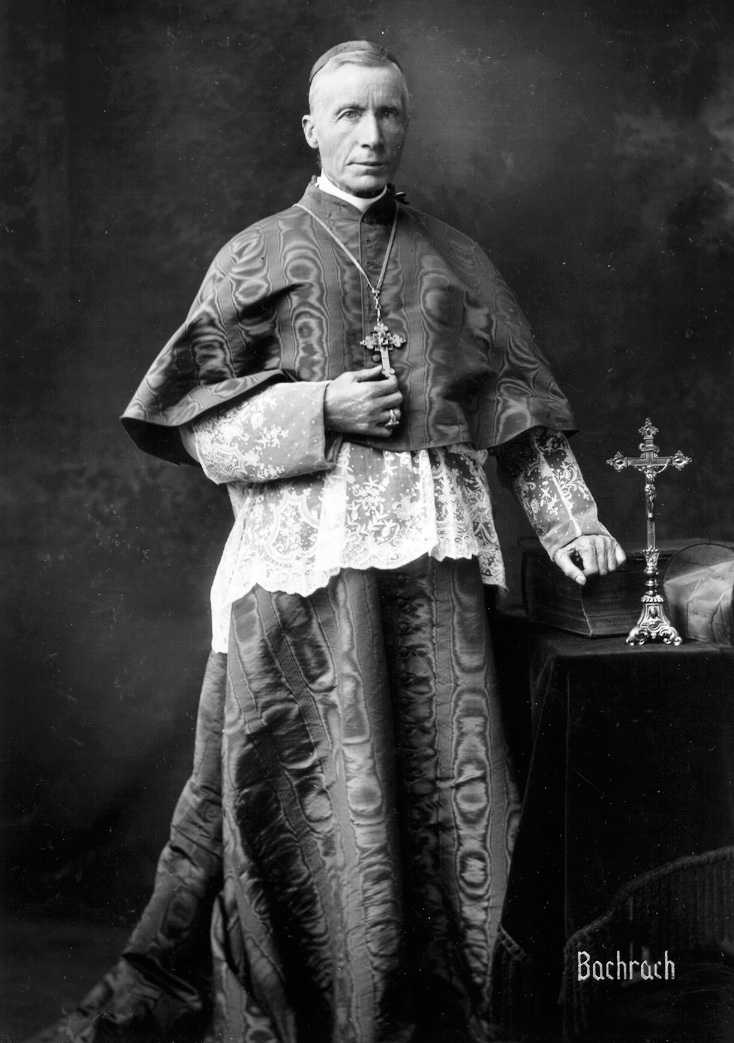
Cardinal-Archbishop James Gibbons (1834–1921), key in establishing Catholic University in 1887, advanced labor rights and Catholicism's harmony with American civic values.

Throughout American religion and education, nuns and sisters have played a major role since the early 19th century in fields such as education, nursing, and social work. In Catholic Europe, convents were endowed and sponsored by the aristocracy, but very few rich American Catholics existed and no aristocrats. Thus, entrepreneurial women founded religious orders that were staffed by devout women from poor families. The numbers grew rapidly: 900 sisters in 15 communities in 1840, 50,000 sisters in 170 congregations in 1900, and 135,000 sisters in 300 different congregations by 1930. Beginning in 1820, sisters outnumbered the priests and brothers. In 1965, the membership peaked at around 180,000 members, falling to 56,000 in 2010, as many women left the orders and not enough joined.

The Congregation for the Doctrine of the Faith initiated a doctrinal assessment of the Leadership Conference of Women Religious in 2008, expressing concern about certain theological positions. Contemporary reporting noted that some U.S. Catholics viewed the investigation critically. The assessment concluded in 2015, when Pope Francis closed the inquiry.

=== 20th–21st centuries ===
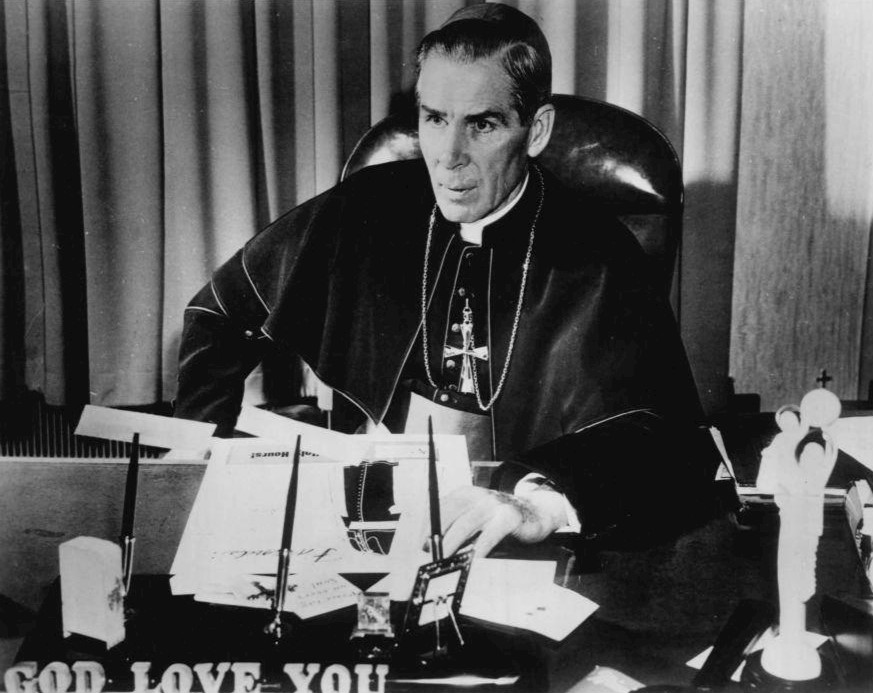
Bishop Fulton J. Sheen launched the television program Life Is Worth Living in the 1950s, using the emerging medium of mass communication to present Catholic teaching to a national audience and becoming one of the era's most prominent religious broadcasters.

During the major immigration waves from the 1840s to 1914, Catholic bishops frequently established separate parishes for distinct ethnic communities, including Irish, German, Polish, French Canadian, and Italian immigrants. In Iowa, for example, the development of the Archdiocese of Dubuque under Bishop Mathias Loras, including the construction of St. Raphael's Cathedral, reflected efforts to meet the pastoral needs of Irish and German Catholics. Italian Jesuits also contributed significantly to Catholic expansion in the American West. Between 1848 and 1919, approximately 400 Jesuit expatriates founded or staffed numerous institutions, including colleges in San Francisco, Santa Clara, Denver, Seattle, and Spokane. They also ministered to miners in Colorado, to Native American communities in several states, and to Hispanic Catholics in New Mexico, where they established churches, published religious materials, and operated schools.

By the early 20th century, roughly one‑sixth of the U.S. population was Catholic. More recent immigration from the Philippines, Poland, Mexico, and other parts of Latin America has further diversified American Catholicism. This multiculturalism is reflected in widespread multilingual liturgies, including Masses offered in Spanish, Tagalog, Polish, Vietnamese, and other languages, as well as the continued use of Latin in some parishes.

In 1908, the United States, along with Canada and five Western European countries, were removed from the Propaganda Fide's jurisdiction and placed under a separate hierarchy.

Sociologist Andrew Greeley, a Catholic priest and scholar at the University of Chicago, conducted extensive national surveys of American Catholics in the late 20th century. His work emphasized the enduring importance of ethnic identity in American Catholic life and described what he called the "Catholic imagination," characterized by a sacramental worldwide and a strong attachment to ritual, narrative, and symbolism. Greeley argued that these cultural elements helped sustain Catholic identity even when individuals disagreed with aspects of church teaching. He also maintained that the 1968 encyclical Humanae vitae, which reaffirmed the Church's prohibition of artificial contraception, contributed to a marked decline in weekly Mass attendance between 1968 and 1975. In 1965, approximatively 71% of American Catholics attended Mass regularly (at least weekly).

In the late 20th century, the Catholic Church in the United States received scrutiny and controversy due to heightened allegations of clerical sexual abuse, especially involving children and adolescents; some observers pointed toward episcopal negligence in arresting and charging clergy for these crimes, which led to numerous civil suits, costing Catholic dioceses hundreds of millions in damages. To safeguard parishioners and the Church from further abuses and scandals, policies and diocesan investigations into seminaries have been enacted to try to correct these former abuses of power; one initiative includes the National Leadership Roundtable on Church Management, a group of laymen dedicated towards bringing better administrative practices to dioceses.

According to a 2015 Pew Research Center study, 39% of American Catholics reported attending Mass at least once a week, while 40% attended once or twice a month. Although trusteeism was largely resolved in the 19th century, occasional disputes over parish property have continued. Examples include the interdict issued in 2005 to the board of St. Stanislaus Kostka Church in St. Louis and debates in Connecticut in 2006 over proposed legislation concerning parish financial governance. Questions about parish assets have also arisen when dioceses have closed or consolidated parishes.

In 2009, English journalist John Micklethwait described American Catholicism as having adopted well to the nation's pluralistic environment while maintaining its core characteristics. In 2011, an estimated 26 million Americans who had been raised Catholic no longer identified with the Church. A 2014 Pew study found that 31.7% of American adults were raised Catholic, but 41% of that group no longer identified as Catholic.

A 2015 study by Georgetown University's Center for Applied Research in the Apostolate estimated that 81.6 million Americans—about 25% of the population—self‑identified as Catholic, including those not affiliated with a parish. Approximately 68.1 million, or 20% of the population, were registered parishioners. About 25% of Catholics reported attending Mass weekly, and 38% attended at least monthly. The study also found that the Catholic Church in the United States is one of the nation's most racially and ethnically diverse religious bodies, with Hispanics comprising 38% of Catholics and Black and Asian Catholics each representing about 3%. Scholars have noted that this diversity has encouraged efforts to build a more inclusive ecclesial identity, echoing the aspirations of 19th‑century leaders such as Archbishops John Ireland and James Gibbons, who sought to integrate Catholic immigrants fully into American society.

Contemporary surveys show that only about 2% of American Catholics receive the sacrament of reconciliation regularly, while most go once a year or less. Catholic teaching requires confession at least annually and after committing mortal sin before receiving Holy Communion.

In late 2019, Matthew Bunson argued that Catholicism has declined due to secularism, materialism, and relativism, which have opened gaps in catechesis, practices, and beliefs. Since 1970, weekly Church attendance has fallen from 55% to 20%, priests from 59,000 to 35,000, and people leaving Catholicism increased from under 2 million to over 30 million today. In 2022, 42,000 nuns were left in the United States, a decline of 76% over 50 years, with fewer than 1% of nuns being under the age of 40.

According to the Pew Research Center, 36% of all Catholic adults in the United States are Hispanic in 2025, up from 27% in 2009. They are more likely to wear or carry religious items, practice devotions to the Virgin Mary or saints, pray the rosary, and light candles for spiritual or religious reasons. In the 2024 presidential election, they voted 55% for Kamala Harris, while they voted 66% for Joe Biden in 2020, a large shift. In August 2023 poll, Hispanic Catholics leaned 60-35 in support of Democrats, while white Catholics leaned 61-37 for Republicans. In 2022, six of the nine U.S. Supreme Court justices were Catholic, showing a growing influence of Catholic policy on Supreme Court cases.

Nearly two-thirds of Catholics felt their trust in the Church's leadership was undermined due to the clergy sexual abuse crisis; however, 86% of Catholics still considered religion an important aspect of their lives.

Following Pope Francis's death in 2025, the conclave elected Cardinal Robert Francis Prevost as the first pope from the United States. Prevost was born in Chicago, was an Augustinian, and attended Villanova University. He chose the papal name of Leo XIV.

== Organization, personnel, and institutions ==
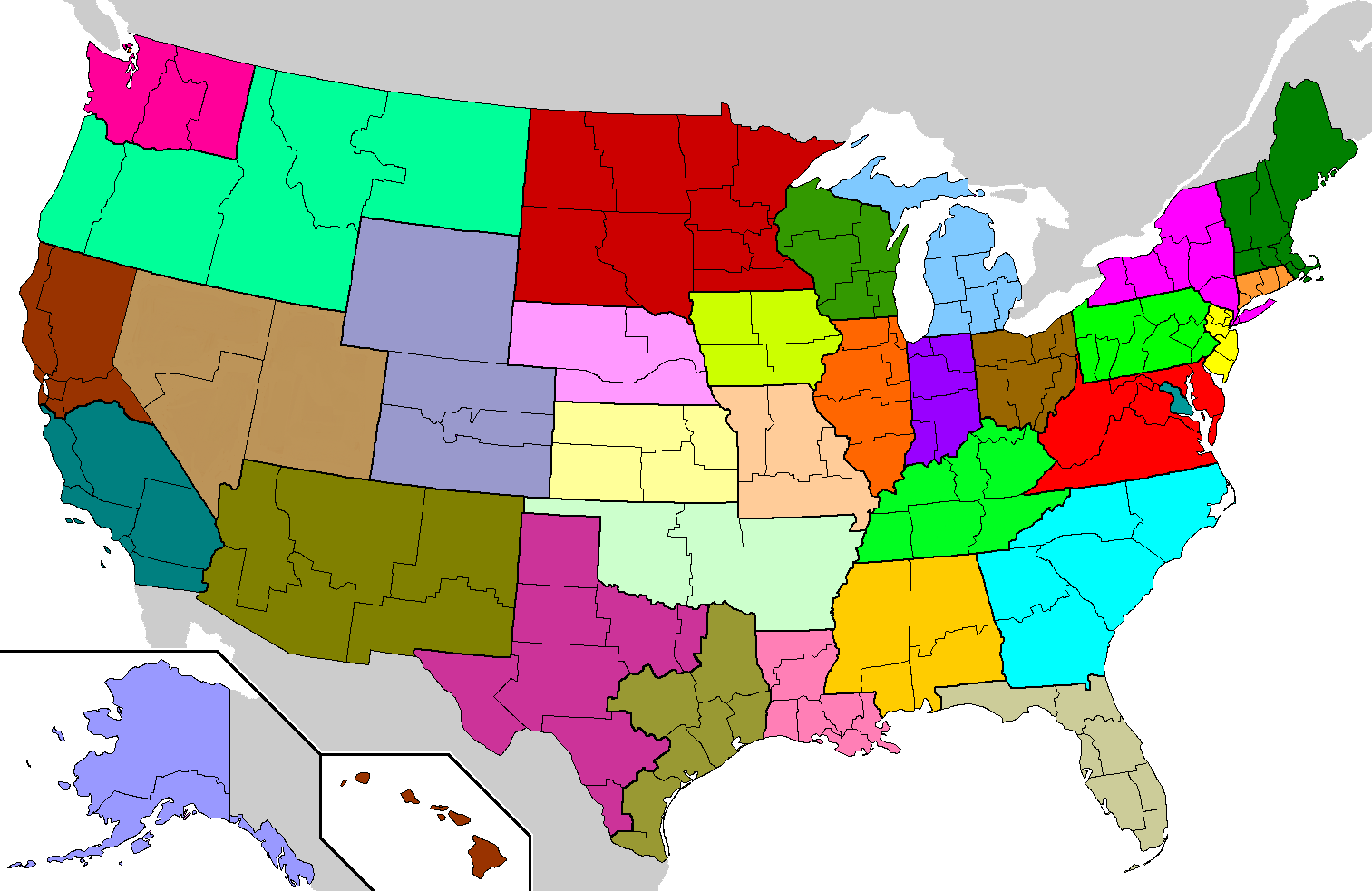
Provinces and dioceses of the Catholic Church in the U.S. with each color representing one of the 32 Latin Church provinces

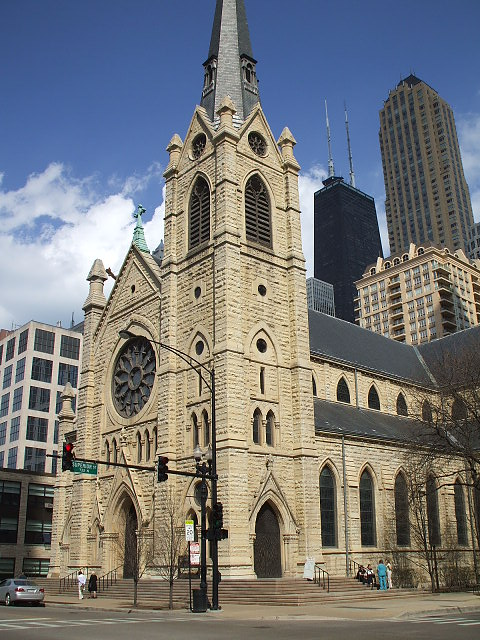
Holy Name Cathedral in Chicago, the mother church of one of the largest Catholic dioceses in the United States

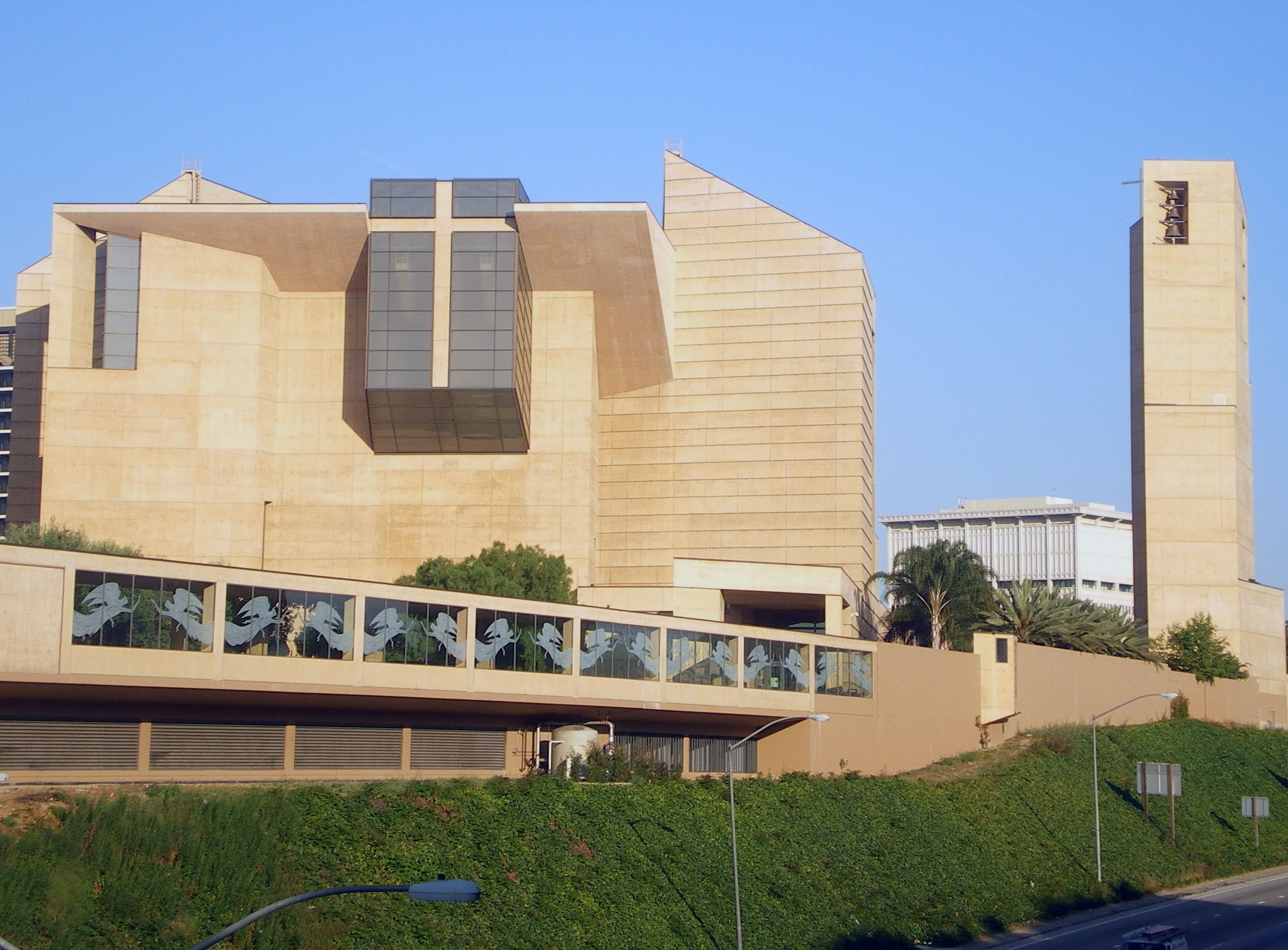
Cathedral of Our Lady of the Angels, the head church of the Archdiocese of Los Angeles and second-largest Catholic church in the United States

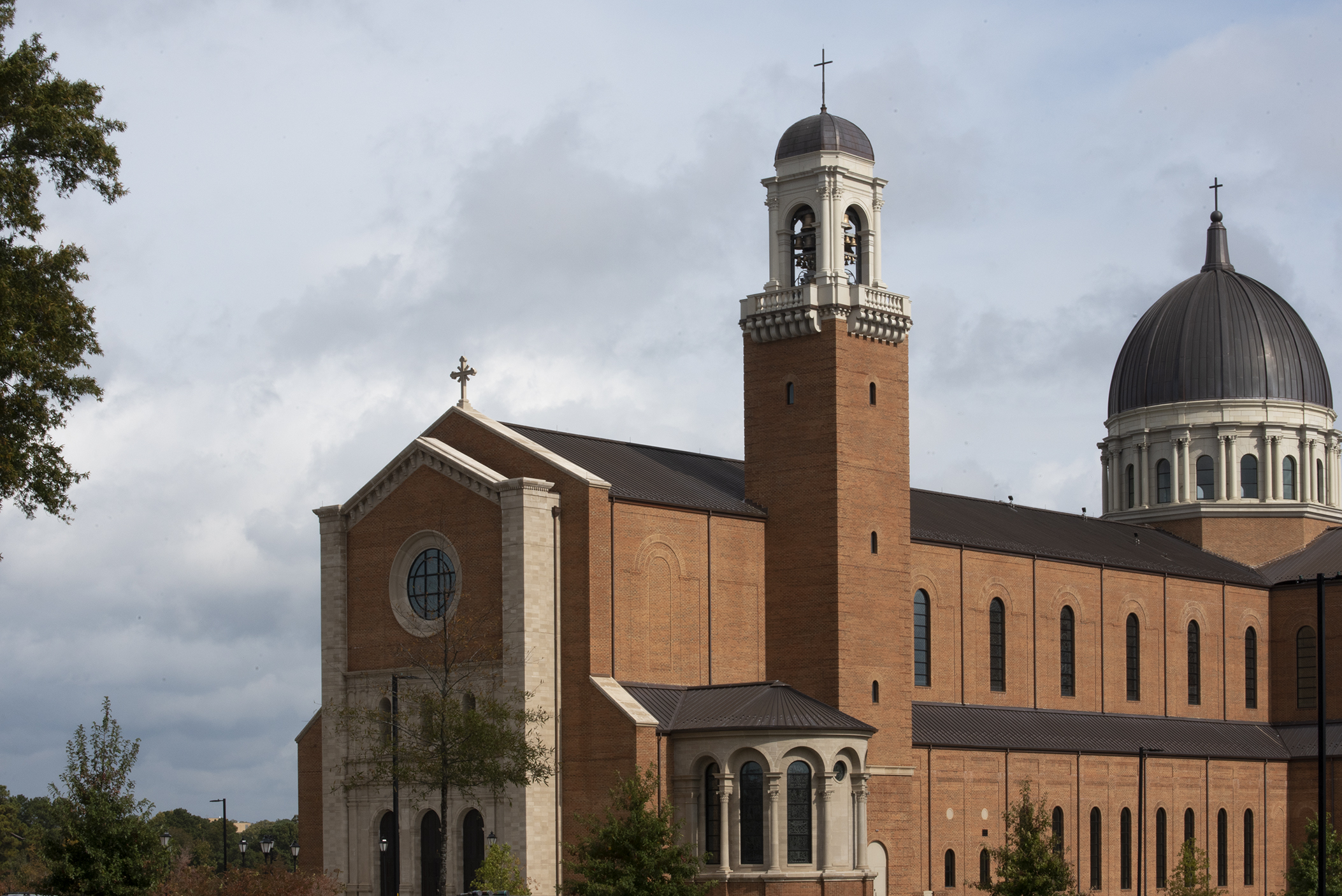
Holy Name of Jesus Cathedral in Raleigh, North Carolina, the fifth- largest cathedral in the United States

=== Organization ===
Catholics in the United States gather in local communities known as parishes, each headed by a priest and centered on a permanent church building where liturgies are celebrated on Sundays, weekdays, and holy days. In 2018, the United States had 17,007 Catholic parishes within 196 geographical dioceses and archdioceses, excluding the Archdiocese for the Military Services. By 2020, the number of parishes had increased to 19,405, the fourth-highest total among U.S. Christian groups, following Southern Baptists, United Methodists, and non-denominational Christian churches. Because the Catholic Church has approximately 61 million adherents—more than any other single Christian body in the country—the average Catholic parish is significantly larger than the average Baptist or Methodist congregation.

The Catholic Church in the United States compromises 197 ecclesiastical jurisdictions, including 177 Latin Church dioceses, 18 Eastern Catholic eparchies, and two special ordinariates. Within the Latin Church, there are 32 archdioceses and 145 dioceses. Eastern Catholic jurisdictions have two archeparchies, including the Byzantine Catholic Archeparchy of Pittsburgh and the Ukrainian Catholic Archeparchy of Philadelphia, and 16 eparchies. The two ordinariates consist of the Archdiocese for the Military Services, USA, which provides pastoral care to members of the armed forces, and the Personal Ordinariate of the Chair of Saint Peter, which serves former Anglicans who have entered full communion with the Catholic Church. The apostolic exarchate for the Syro‑Malankara Catholic Church provides pastoral care for Syro‑Malankara Catholics outside their church's historic territory, headed by a bishop who participates in the United States Conference of Catholic Bishops (USCCB). As of 2026, six dioceses are vacant (sede vacante).

The USCCB serves as the key coordinating body for the Catholic hierarchy in the United States and the U.S. Virgin Islands. The bishops remain independent within their own dioceses, and they are accountable to the Holy See. The USCCB elects a president to oversee its administrative functions, though this role does not confer authority over other bishops. In addition to the dioceses represented in the USCCB, the bishops of Puerto Rico form the Puerto Rican Episcopal Conference, while bishops in Guam, American Samoa, and the Northern Mariana Islands belong to the Episcopal Conference of the Pacific.

The United States has no primate. Historically, in the 1850s, the Archdiocese of Baltimore was granted the Prerogative of Place, giving its archbishop certain ceremonial privileges similar to other primates. Baltimore, established in 1789 with John Carroll as its first bishop, was the first diocese in the United States and long held significant influence. Today, the country includes several major archdioceses and a number of cardinal‑archbishops.

Most American Catholics belong to the Latin Church. While "rite" often refers to liturgical practice, the Second Vatican Council's Orientalium Ecclesiarum affirmed that Eastern Catholic Churches are "true Churches" with their own hierarchies and traditions. Fourteen other Churches in the United States are in full communion with Rome, each with their own bishops and eparchies; the largest is the Chaldean Catholic Church. Most of these Churches are of Eastern Europe and Middle Eastern origins. In recent years, a Traditionalist Catholic movement has formed in the United States and other nations; as of 2026, 465 venues offer the Traditional Latin Mass.

=== Personnel ===
Personnel in the Catholic Church in the United States includes both ordained clergy and a wide range of lay ministers. Ordained offices comprise bishops (including archbishops and auxiliary bishops), priests, and deacons, while non‑ordained roles include lay ecclesial ministers, theologians, catechists, and other pastoral and administrative staff. Some Catholics live forms of consecrated life rather than marriage, such as monks, nuns, friars, and religious brothers and sisters, who profess vows and are a core part of religious institutes recognized by the Church.

Within the hierarchy, a bishop ordinarily serves as the head of a particular diocese, as chief pastor with full ecclesiastical jurisdiction. Dioceses are grouped geographically into ecclesiastical provinces, each led by a metropolitan archbishop and including several suffragan dioceses, usually with limited practical impact on day‑to‑day parish life. Larger dioceses may have one or more auxiliary bishops who assist the diocesan bishop in their duties. Some bishops are appointed to serve as cardinals. Cardinals may retain responsibility for a diocese or hold full‑time positions in the Roman Curia or related institutions. They are traditionally described as being "incardinated" into the Diocese of Rome in addition to their primary assignment. All cardinals under the age of 80 are eligible to participate in a conclave to elect a new pope when the papal office becomes vacant.

There are 440 American active and retired bishops. Active members include three Cardinal Archbishops, 31 Archbishops, 159 Diocesan Bishops, and 75 Auxiliary Bishops, and inactive members have 11 retired Cardinals, 20 retired Archbishops, 91 retired Diocesan Bishops, and 50 retired Auxiliary Bishops. In the United States, there are 17 cardinals: three cardinals currently leading archdioceses, two serving in another capacity, and eleven cardinals being retired. In 2018, 37,302 diocesan and religious-order priests had a role in the United States, including 25,706 diocesan priests, 11,596 religious-order priests, and 523 newly ordained priests. This also included 4,856 seminarians enrolled in the United States, with 3,596 enrolled in diocesan seminaries and 1,260 enrolled in religious-order seminaries. For the deacons in the United States, 18,977 men have been ordained as permanent deacons, and there were 45,100 religious sisters and 3,953 brothers.

Lay employees constitute a substantial portion of the Catholic Church's workforce in the United States, particularly in education and health care. Catholic health care includes approximately 600 hospitals and 1,600 long‑term care and other health facilities operating in all 50 states. Catholic schools enroll about 1,683,506 students in 5,852 elementary and secondary institutions, and there are roughly 200 Catholic colleges and universities in the country. Overall, the Church employs more than one million employees with an operating budget of nearly $100 billion to run parishes, diocesan primary and secondary schools, nursing homes, retreat centers, hospitals, and other charitable institutions.

=== Institutions ===
By the mid-19th century, Catholics built a parochial school system, due to fears of students losing their faith as Protestant teachers and students were in public schools, using low-paid sisters as teachers. Protestants had strong opposition to any public funding of parochial schools. Piety, orthodoxy, and strict disciplines were top priorities, not knowledge of subject matter itself; there was no effort to provide joint teacher training programs, due to indifference from bishops. However, by the latter half of the 20th century, Catholic schools began to perform better than public schools; in 2024, the National Catholic Educational Association reported that 99% of students in 1,174 Catholic secondary schools graduated on time, as well as 85% of them went on to four-year colleges.

In 2011, there were approximately 230 Catholic universities and colleges in the United States with one million students and 65,000 professors. In 2016, it fell to 227, with students falling to 798,006. The national Church university is the Catholic University of America, while the first Catholic college ever established is Georgetown University. The richest university is the University of Notre Dame. In the 2027 edition of U.S. News & World Report rankings, 11 of the top 100 national universities and 7 of the top national liberal arts colleges in the US were Catholic.

According to the 2016 Official Catholic Directory, there were 243 seminaries with 4,785 students in the United States, which included 3,629 diocesan seminarians and 1,456 religious seminarians. By 2017, there were 5,050 seminarians, including 3,694 diocesan and 1,356 religious members. In addition, the American Catholic bishops oversaw the Pontifical North American College for American seminarians and priests that studied at one of the Pontifical Universities in Rome.

In 2002, the Catholic health care system oversaw 625 hospitals with a revenue of 30 billion dollars, which became the nation's largest group of nonprofit systems. In 2008, the cost of running these hospitals had risen to $84.6 billion, including $5.7 billion in donations. According to the Catholic Health Association of the United States, their 60 health care systems, on average, admitted one in six patients nationwide each year. According to Merger Watch in 2018, Catholic facilities made up about 10% of all sole community providers. In some states, Catholic hospitals accounted for at least 50% of sole community providers.

Catholic Charities is one of the largest voluntary social service networks in the United States. In 2010, it was one of only four charities among the top 400 charitable organizations to witness donation increases, according to a survey conducted by The Chronicle of Philanthropy.

== Demographics ==
A map showing plurality religious denominations by state as of 2024 to 2025, according to the Pew Research Center. Catholics made up a plurality of the population in five of the nation's 50 states: Massachusetts, New Jersey, New York, Connecticut, and Rhode Island. Protestant 70 – 79% 60 – 69% 50 – 59% 40 – 49% Under 40% Catholic 40 – 49% Under 40% Mormon 50 – 59% Unaffiliated 40 – 49% Under 40%

=== Origins ===
Catholic population growth in the United States accelerated during the 19th and early 20th centuries, driven by high fertility rates and large‑scale immigration from Ireland and Germany, and later from Eastern Europe, Italy, and Quebec. After 1910, significant immigration from Mexico and other parts of Latin America further increased the Catholic population. By 2019, Latinos accounted for approximately 37% of American Catholics, even though Catholics are historically concentrated in the Northeast and the urban Midwest, but the Northeast now has 24%, the Midwest with 19%, and the South with 32%. The Northeast had had a decline of parishes since 1970, but there has been an increase in parishes in the other regions. From 2010 to 2020, strong Catholic growth happened in Nevada, Arizona, Florida, South Carolina, and North Carolina; however, losses occurred in New Hampshire, Massachusetts, Connecticut, Pennsylvania, and New Jersey.

Catholic Americans fell from 25% to 22% since 1960, and a 2021 Pew Research Study highlighted that 21% of adults identified as Catholic, identical to their population in 2014. In terms of absolute numbers, Catholics have increased from 45 million to 72 million, and 39% attended Church weekly compared to 45% of American Protestants in the years 2014 to 2017. Around 10% of the population as of 2010 are former Catholics, averaging around 30 million people, due to loss of belief, indifference, or for other reasons.

Since 1960, the percentage of Americans who are Catholic has fallen from about 25% to 22%. In a 2021 Pew Research study, "21% of US adults described themselves as Catholic, identical to the Catholic share of the population in 2014." In absolute numbers, Catholics have increased from 45 million to 72 million. In the years 2014–2017 39% of American Catholics attended church weekly, compared to 45% of American Protestants. The income distribution of Catholics is similar to the income distribution of the whole population. Educational attainment is also similar to the adult population with 35% being college graduates. 53% of Asian Catholics and 43% of White Catholics hold a bachelor's degree or higher, compared with 20% of Hispanic Catholics. Around 38% of Black Catholics were college-educated as well.

In 2017, there were 70,412,000 registered Catholics, around 22% of the United States' population, which was done using the parish assessment tax for registered members and contributors. In 2021, the Public Religion Research Institute noted that 22% of the 330 million Americans identified as Catholic, as 12% were white, 8% Latino, and 2% other, including Black, Asian, and other races. According to the researcher director of Americans for Religious Liberty, many Americans call themselves Catholic but do not register at local parishes. According to a 2008 survey, 23.9% identified as Catholic, also noting that 10% of those identified as Protestants are former Catholics and 8% of those identified as Catholics were former Protestants. American Catholics make up around 6% of the Church's membership.

=== Ethnicity and population ===
A 2004 poll found Catholic ethnicity to be 60% non-Hispanic white, 31% Hispanic of any nationality, 4% Black, and 5% of another ethnicity. Among non-Hispanic whites, about 16 million were of Irish descent, 13 million German descent, 12 million Italian descent, 7 million Polish descent, and 5 million of French descent. Most of the 7.8 million Catholic converts were also mostly non-Hispanic white. Between 1990 and 2008, there were 11 million additional Catholics, with Latino population growth accounting for 9 million and around 32% of Catholics in 2008 as opposed to 20% in 1990. Hispanics who identified as Catholic dropped from 67% to 55% from 2010 to 2013.

According to a 2014 report, 50.9 million adult Catholics formed about 20.8% of the population, down from 54.3 million and 23.9% in 2007, noting the aging population and younger members leaving the faith (around 41%, as opposed to 32% overall) with the worst net conversion balance of any major religious group. According to a 2015 survey, the Catholic population share was stable, and 59% were non-Hispanic white, 34% Hispanic, 3% Black, 3% Asian, and 2% mixed or Native American.19% of non-Hispanic whites were Catholic in 2014 (down from 22% in 2007). In 2015, Hispanics were 38%, while Blacks and Asians were at 3% each, as conversion away from Catholicism and dropping religion is occurring quickly among Hispanics than among non-Hispanic whites and other races. The Pew Research Center predicts that by 2050, only 40% of third-generation Latinos will be Catholic, as 22% will become Protestant, 24% unaffiliated, and the rest going to other denominations. This report corresponded with a sharp decline in the Catholic percentage among self-identified Democrats, who are more likely to be nonwhite than Republicans. In one study, authors found that 10% of Catholics in the United States are "secularists", with their religious identification being purely nominal.

According to a 2023–24 Pew Research Center survey, 62% of Americans identified as Christians, which included 19% of them as Catholics. According to Pew Research Center, 20% of Catholics live in Midwest, 26% in the Northeast, 29% in the South, and 25% in the West, with a majority of Catholics being older, as 14% are between 18 and 29, 27% between 30 and 49, 29% are 50 to 65, and 28% are 65 or older.

According to figures compiled by Shane Schatezel and research data from the Center for Applied Research in the Apostolate (CARA), Pew Research Center, the National Catholic Register, and Vatican statistics, adult conversions to the Catholic Church in the United States are "once again on the rise" after "two decades of decline." Schatezel also notes that the figures "do not represent Catholic immigrants being counted anew, but rather Americans themselves choosing to embrace the faith."

== Politics and views ==
Catholicism has had a political impact on the United States, historically associated with left-wing politics and the Democratic Party. Since the 1970s, Catholics are often regarded as swing voters. The 1840s saw Catholics began to identify with the Democrats against the conservative and evangelical-influenced Whigs. In the 1890s, Catholics favored the Democratic Party over the Republicans, continuing into the 20th century, where Catholics formed a core part of the New Deal Coalition. Al Smith, the governor of New York, was the first Catholic nominated for President by a major party, as the Democratic nominee in the 1928 election.

Two Catholics have been President of the United States: John F. Kennedy (1961–1963) and Joe Biden (2021–2025). According to the Pew Research Center, Catholics are the most likely of any major Christian group in the United States to support morality of casual sex. Surveys have repeatedly indicated that laity are more culturally liberal than median voters, including on abortion and same-sex marriage, even when the Catholic Church opposes both, with Church leadership leaning more orthodox. Catholicism is also diverse politically, as there are some fundamentalist-like activist conservative groups. Furthermore, in the 2024 election, Catholics shifted to the right, as 55% of Hispanic Catholics voted for Kamala Harris, while Biden had a 66% support rate among them.

In 2023, Pope Francis criticized the Catholic Church in the United States as reactionary, saying that ideology had replaced faith in some parts. In November, he removed Joseph E. Strickland of Tyler, Texas, who was seen as a more conservative bishop. Pope Francis had also criticized President Donald Trump, especially over his immigration policies, and Pope Leo XIV has done so as well.In April 2026, President Donald Trump criticized Pope Leo XIV, claiming that the Pope was weak on crime and foreign policy in response to the Pope's criticism of the 2026 Iran war. The Pope replied “I have no fear of the Trump administration or speaking out loudly of the message of the Gospel, which is what I believe I am here to do, what the church is here to do.”

== Catholics and pilgrimage sites ==
There have been many notable American Catholics, including clergy members, entertainment actors, hosts, and singers, as well as famous politicians, basketball players, and novelists. Moreover, there have been many famous American pilgrimage sites constructed and developed.

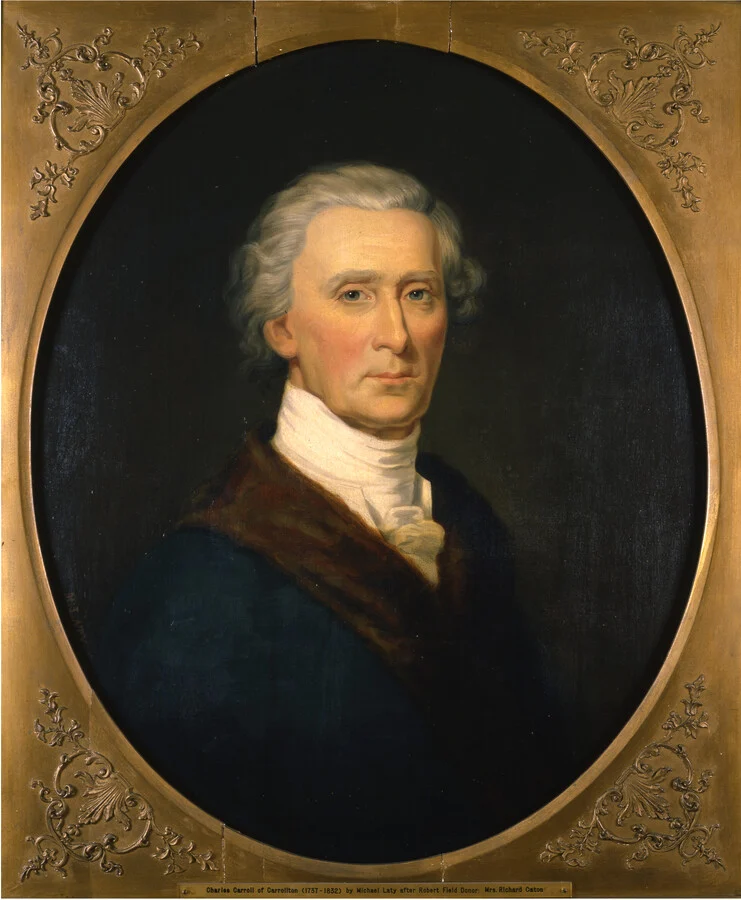
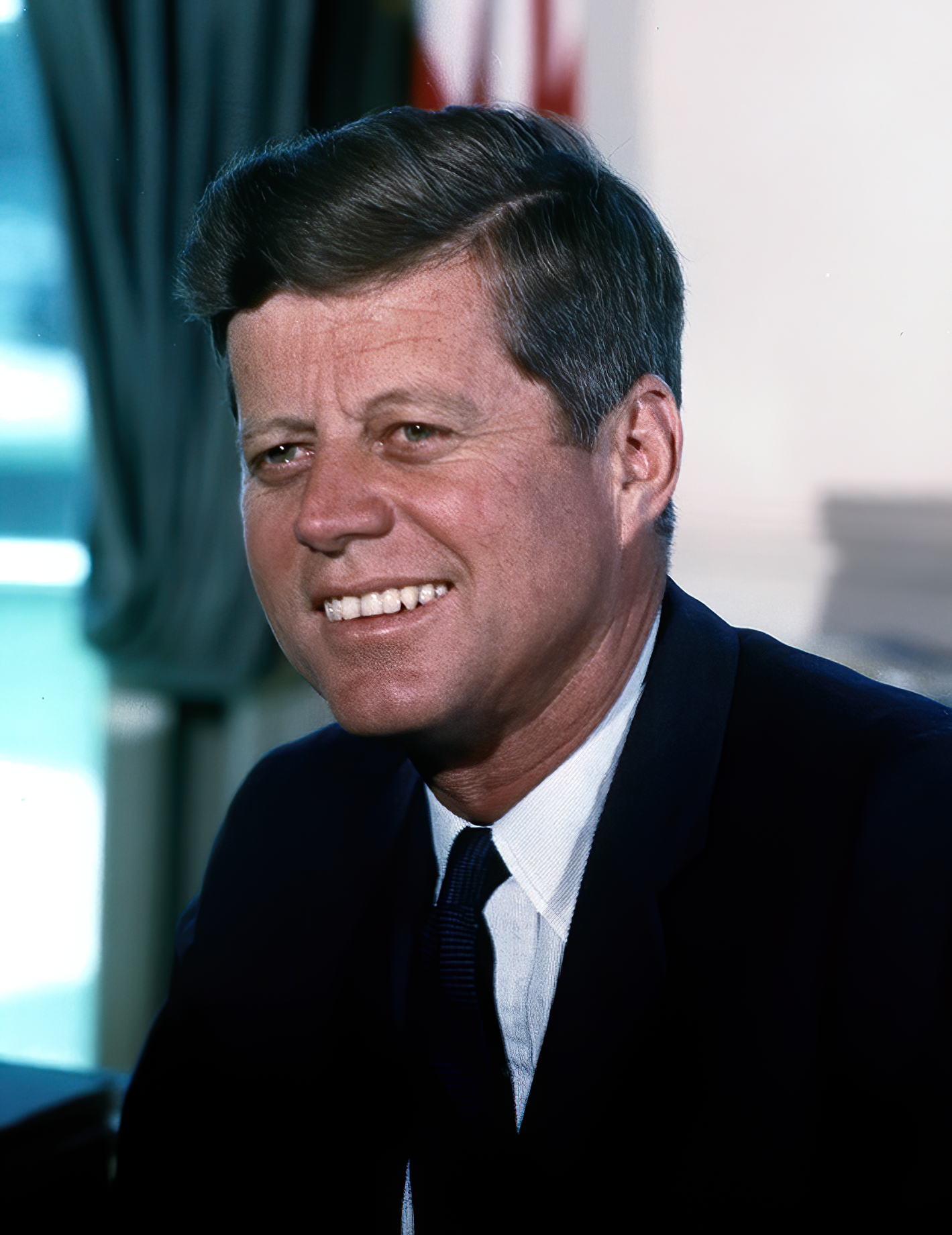
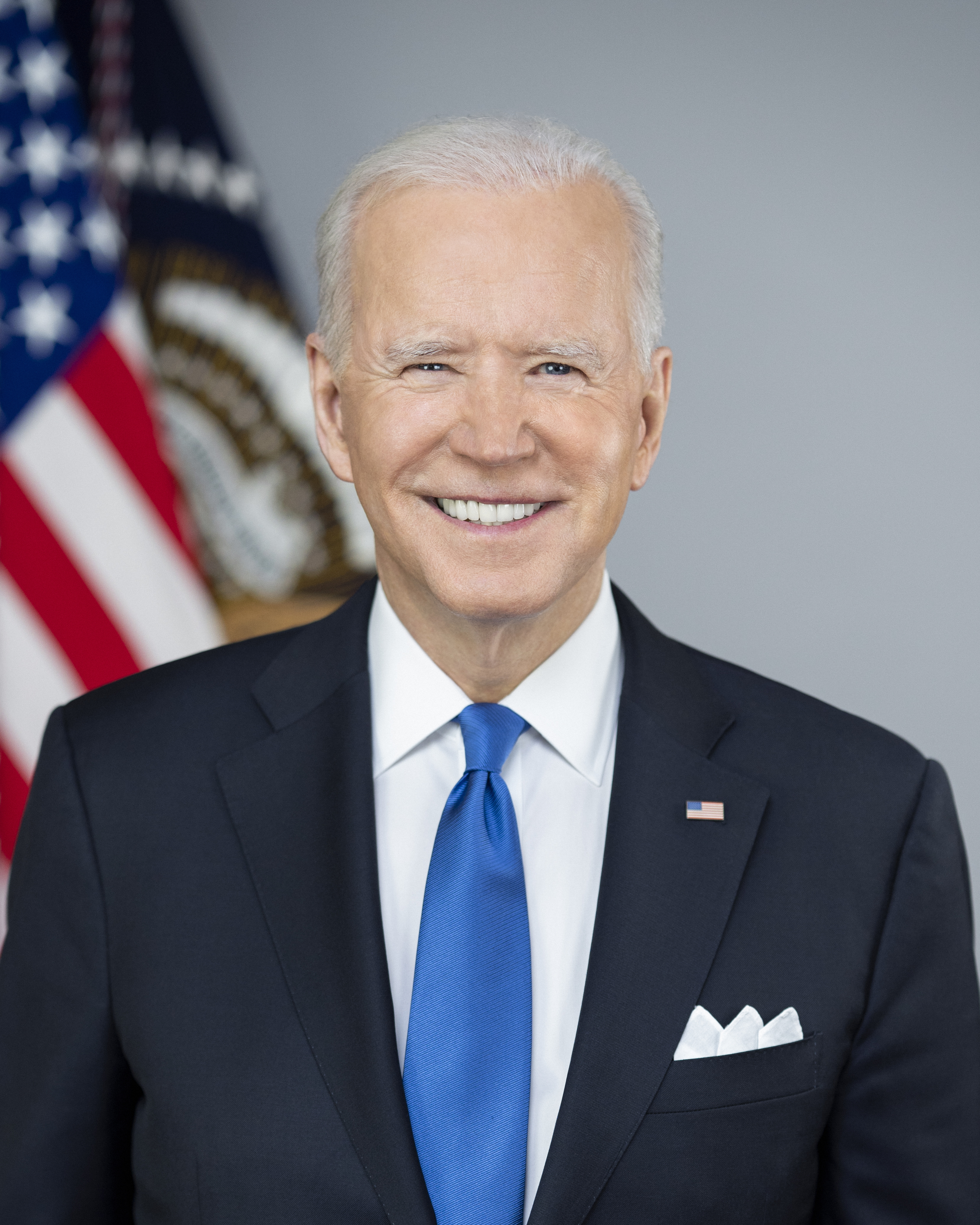
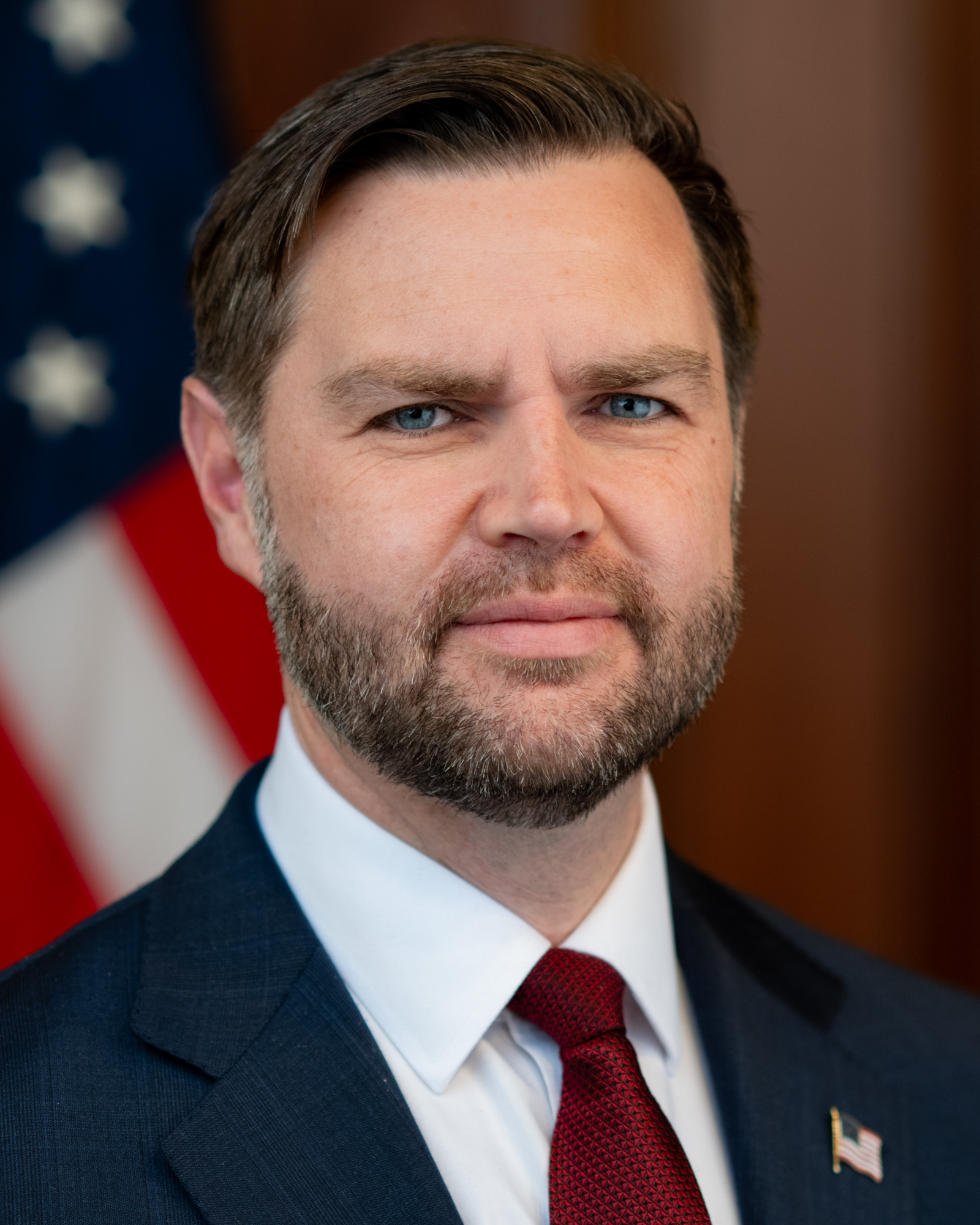
Charles Carroll III (top left) was the only Catholic signatory of the Declaration of Independence. John F. Kennedy (top right) and Joe Biden (bottom left) are the only Catholics ever to have been elected President; additionally, Biden and JD Vance (bottom right) are also the only Catholics ever to have been elected Vice President.

=== Clergy, entertainment, and politics ===
For clergy members, notable members include Pope Leo XIV, Robert Barron, Timothy Dolan, and James Martin. In the field of entertainment, famous members include Jim Caviezel, Stephen Colbert, Jimmy Fallon, Mel Gibson, Grace Kelly, Jimmy Kimmel, Martin Sheen, Mark Wahlberg, John Wayne, and Jane Wyman.

Famous political members include Associates Justices Samuel Alito, Amy Coney Barrett, Brett Kavanaugh, Sonia Sotomayor, and Clarence Thomas, along with the Chief justice John Roberts. Others included the Kennedy family: John F. Kennedy, Robert F. Kennedy, and Ted Kennedy. Two Founding Fathers were also Catholic: Charles Carroll of Carrollton and Daniel Carroll. Famous Catholic politicians include John Boehner, Nancy Pelosi, Joe Biden, Paul Ryan, Jeb Bush, Marco Rubio, Rick Santorum, Chris Christie, and current Vice President JD Vance. Other members included Kobe Bryant, John Carroll, and Toni Morrison.

=== Saints and blesseds ===
Famous saints and blesseds have contributed to Catholicism within the United States.

Saints include Elizabeth Ann Seton, John Neumann, Marianne Cope, Katharine Drexel, Damien de Veuster of Molokai, Junípero Serra, Kateri Tekakwitha, Teresa of Calcutta, Théodore Guérin, Isaac Jogues, Frances Xavier Cabrini, and Rose Philippine Duchesne. Blesseds include Miriam Teresa Demjanovich, Stanley Rother, Solanus Casey, Michael J. McGivney, Francis Xavier Seelos, Fulton Sheen, and Blessed Carlos Manuel Cecilio Rodríguez Santiago of Puerto Rico.

=== Pilgrimage destinations ===
Famous pilgrimage destinations in the United States include Cathedral Basilica of St. Augustine, Shrine of the Little Flower Basilica in Royal Oak, Loretto Chapel in Santa Fe, the Mother Cabrini Shrine, National Shrine of the Immaculate Conception, the St. Anthony Chapel, Ave Maria Grotto, the National Shrine of Our Lady of Champion in New Franken, Wisconsin, and the Shrine of the Grotto of the Redemption in West Bend, Iowa.

== See also ==
- Catholic Church and politics in the United States
- History of the Catholic Church in the United States
- Holy See–United States relations
- List of American Catholic priests
- List of Catholic dioceses in the United States
