= Compton, Maryland =

Unincorporated community in Maryland, U.S.

Coordinates: 38°16′30″N 76°41′35″W

Compton is an unincorporated community near Leonardtown in St. Mary's County, Maryland, United States. The St. Francis Xavier Church and Newtown Manor House Historic District were listed on the National Register of Historic Places in 1972. The ZIP Code for Compton is 20627.
