= St. Francis Xavier Church and Newtown Manor House Historic District =

Historic district in Maryland, United States

- St. Francis Xavier Church and Newtown Manor House Historic District (Compton, MD)
- U.S. National Register of Historic Places
- U.S. Historic district
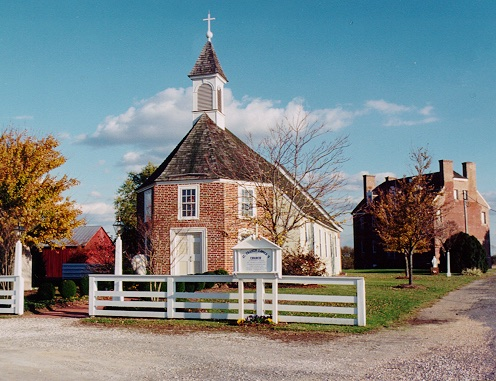

- Location within Maryland Location within the United States
- Location: S of Compton on MD 243, Compton, Maryland
- Coordinates: 38°15′20″N 76°42′1″W
- Built: 1731 (1767)
- NRHP reference No.: 72001485
- Added to NRHP: November 9, 1972

St. Francis Xavier Church and Newtown Manor House Historic District is the first county-designated historic district in Saint Mary's County, the "Mother County" of Maryland and is located in Compton, Maryland, near the county seat of Leonardtown. The district marks a location and site important in the 17th-century ecclesiastical history of Maryland, as an example of a self-contained Jesuit community made self-supporting by the surrounding 700-acre (2.8 km^{2}) farm. The two principal historic structures were added to the National Register of Historic Places in 1972. Archaeological remains associated with the site date back to the early colonial period, mid-17th century.

== St. Francis Xavier Church ==
=== History ===
St. Francis Xavier Church is the oldest Catholic church in continuous operation from the original 13 English colonies. The community was established by the Jesuits as a mission in 1640, after the conversion of Chitomacon, the Piscataway king. It was established as an independent parish in 1661.

The original parish church was located at the site of the present-day St Francis Xavier Catholic Cemetery. The second, existing church building, at the Jesuit's Newtown Manor site, dates from 1731, when Catholics met in clandestine houses of worship for safety.

In 1767, a vestibule and steeple were added at the west end, to identify the building as a church, and barrel vaulting was added in the nave. A sacristy with quarters for visiting priests was added in 1816. The Jesuits had moved their communities and school from St Inigoes and Newtown Manor to their present location in Georgetown, Washington, D.C.

=== Architecture ===
Saint Francis Xavier's Church is a frame, rectangular building with two octagonally shaped brick additions, located on a neck of land for accessibility to early worshippers arriving by boat. Their center wooden section is understood to be the oldest part of the structure and was dated through dendrochronology to circa 1731. The semi-octagonal brick vestibule dates to 1766/1767 and the semi-octagonal sacristy dates to 1816. The church has simple Federal woodwork, a mid-18th-century reredos, and an elegant triple-vaulted ceiling. The altar and reredos are crowned by a small dome.

The reredos contains a large altar-painting of the church's patron painted by the Brother Francis Schroen, S.J. circa 1910. The church building continues to serve as the parish church, for the parish of Saint Francis Xavier, a parish of the Roman Catholic Archdiocese of Washington.

== Newtown Manor House ==
The current Newtown Manor House was originally constructed in 1789 to replace an older structure that may have been burned during the Revolutionary War. It is a 2 1/2-story brick, five-bay brick house with a pair of interior chimneys at each gable end. The structure originally had a gambrel roof, which was raised and changed to its present shape in 1816. The house, which belongs to the parish, is currently unoccupied.

== Gallery ==
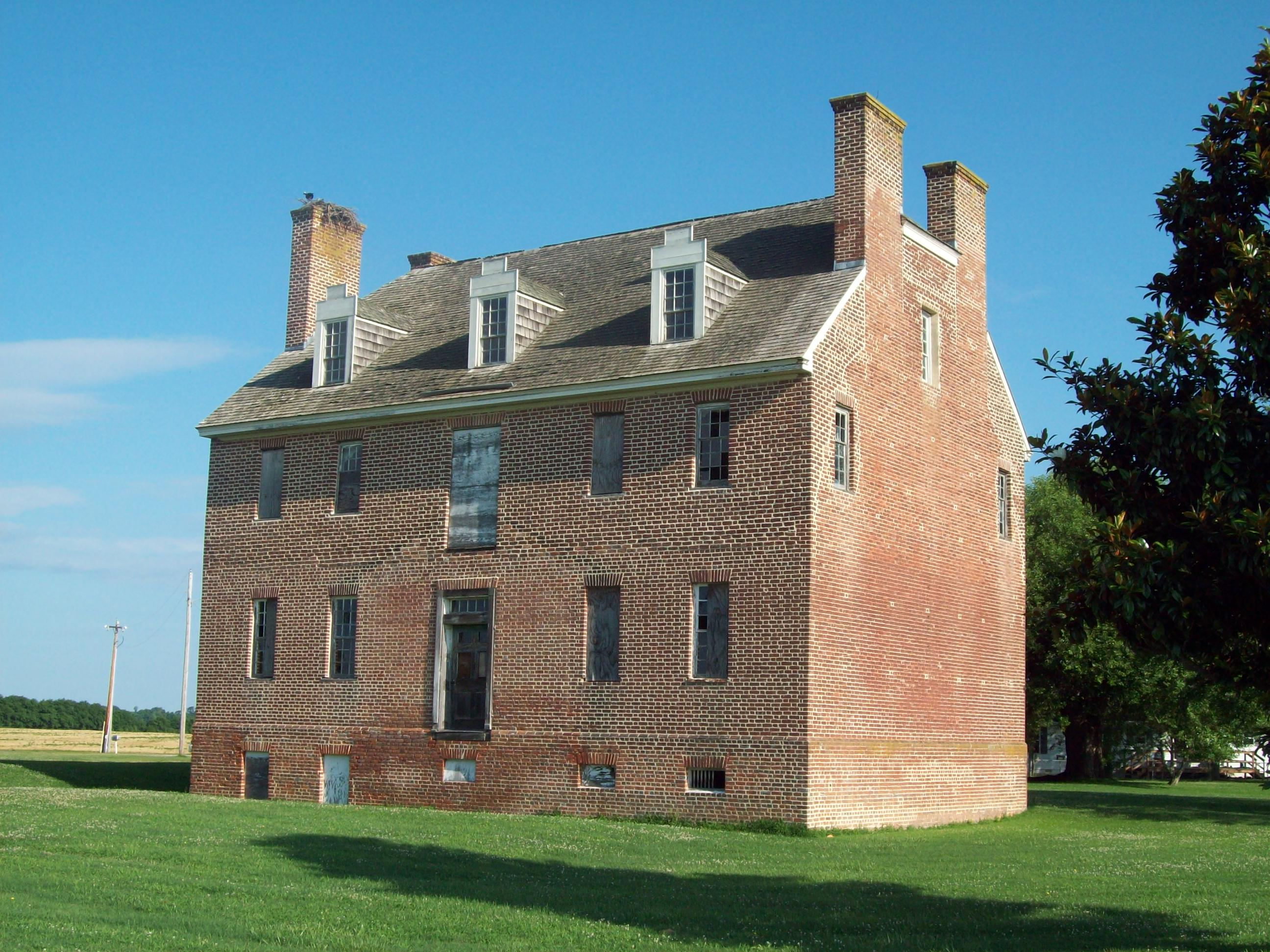
Newtown Manor House, July 2009

== See also ==
- List of Jesuit sites
