= The Pious Guide to Prayer and Devotion =

- Author: Anonymous
- Language: English
- Publisher: John Doyle
- Publication date: 1792
- Publication place: Georgetown (Washington, D.C.)

The Pious Guide to Prayer and Devotion was a Catholic devotional guide published in the United States from 1792 to 1852. Its author is unknown, but is suspected to be either Robert Plunkett, the first president of Georgetown University, or one or more of the former members of the Maryland province of the then-suppressed Jesuits. It was one of the first prayer books to be written in the United States for American Catholics.
