= Pope Leo XIV bibliography =

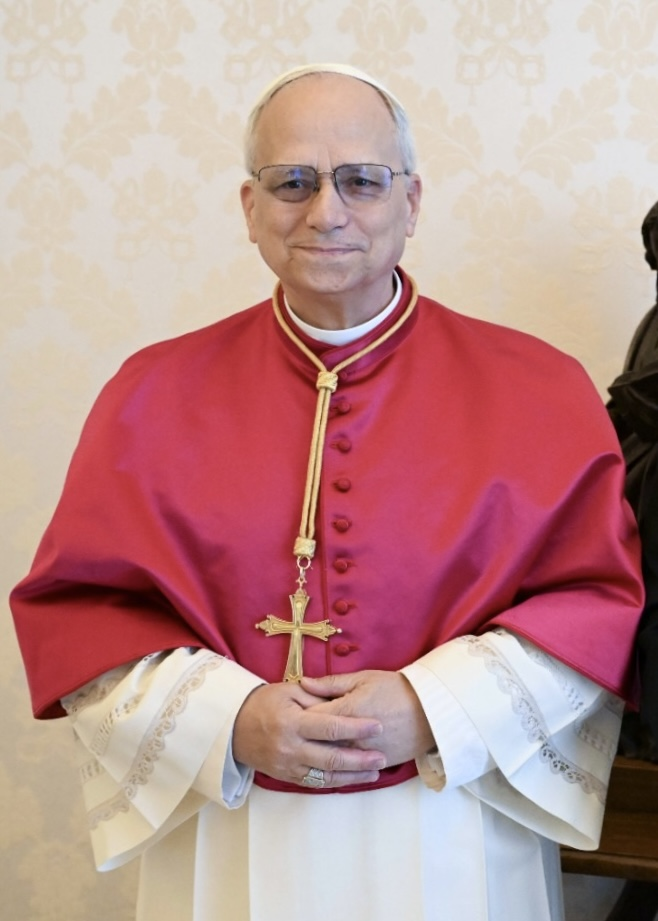
- Pope Leo XIV in 2025

Prior to ascending to the papacy as Pope Leo XIV, Robert Prevost contributed to journals and books under his birth name. Publishers Weekly suggests that he has only authored one book, Rule and Constitutions of the Order of Saint Augustine, published in 2002 by Villanova University.

== Before papacy ==
=== Dissertation ===
- The office and authority of the local Prior in the Order of Saint Augustine (JCD thesis). Pontifical University of Saint Thomas Aquinas. 1987. OCLC 310749292.

=== Books ===
- Rule and Constitutions of the Order of Saint Augustine. Pennsylvania: Augustinian Historical Institute, Villanova University. 2002.

==== Individual chapters ====
- Van Bavel, Tarsicius Jan; Bruning, Bernard, eds. (2007). "Sint-Augustinus, een fascinerend man". Sint-Augustinus (in Dutch). Brussels: Mercator. pp. 7–8. ISBN 9789061537311.
  - ———————; ———————, eds. (2007). "Saint Augustin, une présentation". Saint Augustin (in French). Mercator. pp. 7–8. (Note: The French version of the above Dutch book)
- Delle Foglie, Anna (2011). "Presentazione" [Introduction]. La cappella Caracciolo del Sole a San Giovanni a Carbonara (in Italian). Jaca Book. ISBN 978-88-16-41107-4.
- Marín de San Martín, Luis, ed. (2012). "Conclusion". La ripresa dell'ordine: gli agostiniani tra 1850-1920 : Congresso dell'Istituto storico Agostiniano, Roma 15-19 ottobre 2012 (in Italian). Institutum historicum Augustinianum.

=== Journal articles ===
- "The Office and Authority of the Local Augustinian Prior 4. The munus docendi". Augustinian Heritage. 33: 187–200. 1987. ISSN 0888-2274.
- "Palabras conclusivas del R.P. Robert Prevost, prior general de la Orden de San Agustín, sobre los agustinos y el estudio de la patrología". Religión y Cultura (in Spanish). 5/II: 503–510. 2006. ISBN 987-21404-6-4.
- Prevost, Robert (2006). "Grußwort des P. Generalpriors Robert Prevost". Augustiniana (in German). 56 (3/4): 199–200. ISSN 0004-8003. JSTOR 44993213.
- "Homilía de la Eucaristía de clausura: parroquia Santa Rita de Madrid, 26 noviembre 2006". Revista agustiniana (in Spanish). 48 (145): 189–193. 2007. ISSN 0211-612X.

== Apostolic Letter ==
=== Issued motu proprio ===
- Coniuncta cura (September 29, 2025) Text (IT)
- Immota manet (November 26, 2025) Text (IT)
- Confirma fratres tuos (June 30, 2026) Text (IT)
- Mutua concordia (August 29, 2026) Text (IT)

=== Other Letters ===
- Drawing New Maps of Hope (October 27, 2025) Text (IT)
- In unitate fidei (November 23, 2025) Text
- A Fidelity that Generates the Future (December 22, 2025) Text

== Encyclical ==
- Magnifica humanitas (signed May 15, 2026; published May 25, 2026)

== Exhortation ==
- Dilexi te (October 9, 2025) Text
