= Peter of Ancarano =

Italian jurist

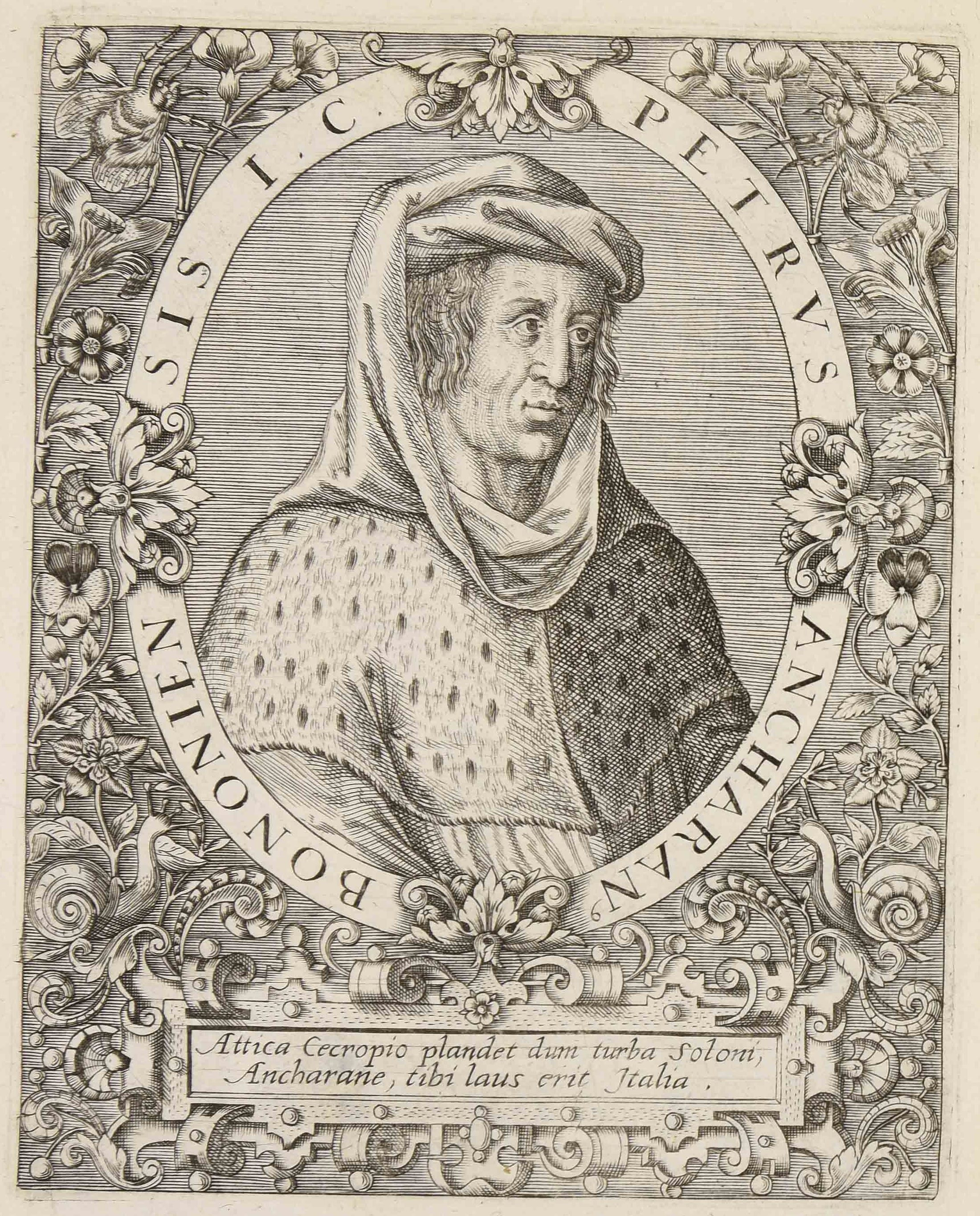
Engraving by Theodor de Bry (1597)

Peter of Ancarano (Italian: Piètro d'Ancarano, Latin: Petrus Ancharanus) (c.1333 – 1416) was an Italian jurist. He worked in the tradition of Giovanni d'Andrea. He earned the Latin nickname anchora juris, and was also known as Pietro de Farneto.

== Life ==
He studied Roman law under Baldus de Ubaldis at Perugia, and then canon law under Bartholomeus de Saliceto at Bologna. His academic career was mainly at Bologna. He was an influential jurisconsult and teacher in Florence from the 1390s. He spent time also at Siena and Venice.

In 1402, he moved to the University of Ferrara, with Antonius de Butrio (who was one of his students) and Johannes de Imola. An elaborator of conciliarism, he participated in the Council of Pisa and Council of Constance on behalf of Antipope John XXIII.

== Views ==
Peter of Ancarano's commentary on the Decretals of Gregory IX was celebrated.

On his Tractatus de schismate (written 1405, unpublished but widely circulated as manuscript), his views were fundamentally in favour of papal monarchy; but in terms of the Western Schism as it stood after 1400, the behaviour of both Antipope Benedict XIII and Pope Gregory XII made him shift ground towards a conciliar resolution. Baldassarre Cossa (shortly to be an antipope as John XXIII) persuaded him, perhaps with Butrio, to write in 1405 on the schism. In line with the Bologna faculty generally, and Francesco Zabarella, he believed Pope Gregory, in particular, should keep to commitments he had made.

The marriage of Thomas of Lancaster, 1st Duke of Clarence and Margaret Holland in 1412 required a papal dispensation, because of the degree of consanguinity as defined in canon law and the Book of Leviticus. The dispensation was granted by John XXIII, against quite recent precedent (the 1392 case of Bernard VII, Count of Armagnac who wished to marry the widow of his late brother John III, Count of Armagnac, and was refused by Pope Clement VII); and proceeded on the basis of an opinion of Peter of Ancarano (influenced by Andrea). It created a precedent itself, on papal powers.

== Works ==
- Lectura super Clementinis, Venice 1483
- Disputatio super imprestitis montis novi, Venice, ca. 1499/1500
- Repetitio capituli 'Canonum statuta De constitutionibus', Rome 1475, Bologna 1493, Venice 1500
- Repetitio capituli 'Postulati de foro competente', Bologna 1474, Toulouse 1484/90

He wrote also a number of Consilia, Repetitiones, Responsa and commentaries to the Decretals:

- Consilia, Rome 1474, Pavia 1496.
  - Consilia (in Latin). Lyon: Jacques Giunta, héritiers. 1549.
- Super I Librum Decretalium, Lyon 1518, Lyon 1535, Bologna 1581.
- Super II Librum Decretalium, Lyon 1519, Lyon 1535, Bologna 1581.
- Super Sexto Librum Decretalium, Venice 1501
