= Decretals of Gregory IX =

1230 codification of Catholic canon law commissioned by Pope Gregory IX

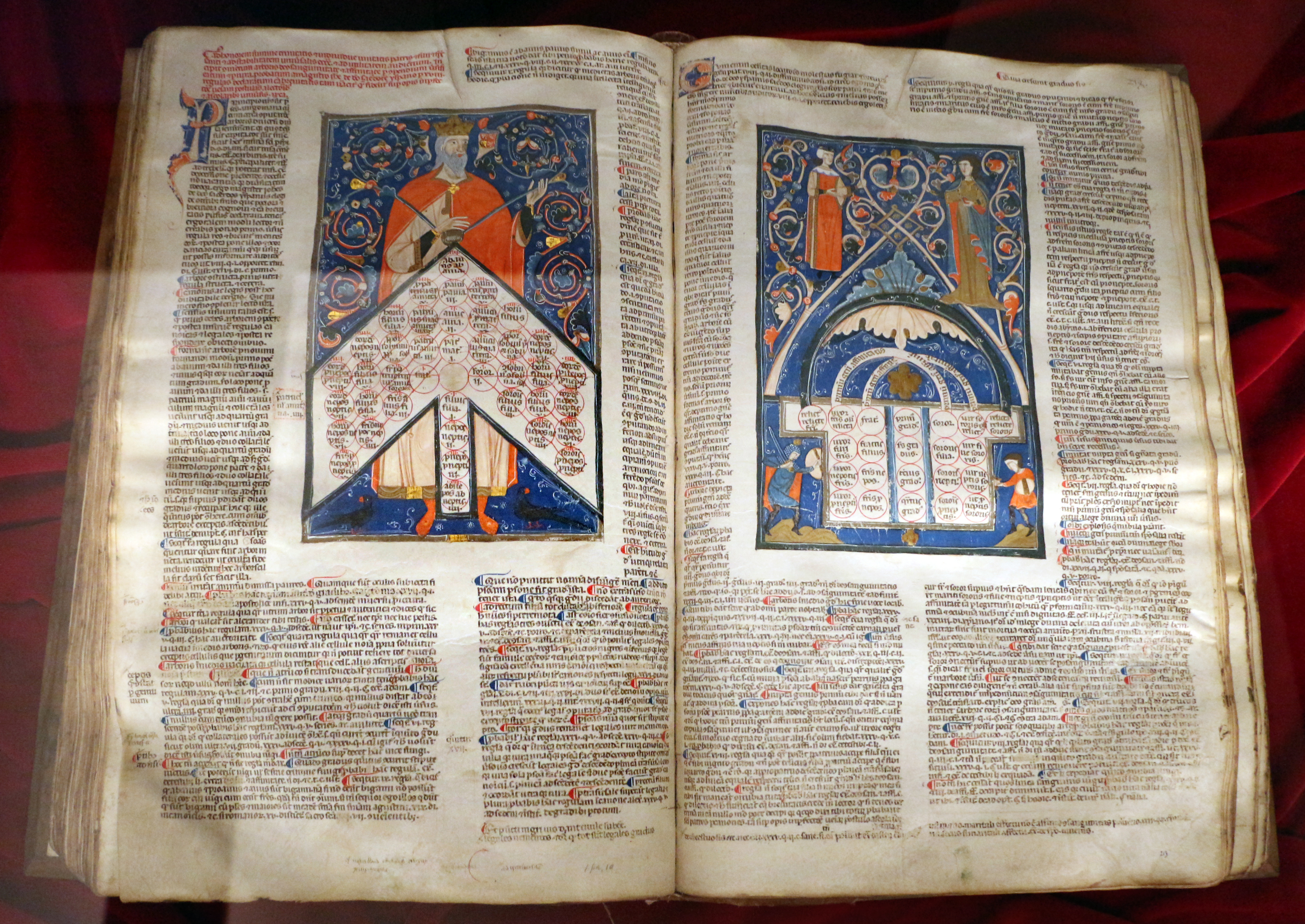
Gregorius IX Decretales, c. 1290, Biblioteca Medicea Laurenziana, Florence

The Decretals of Gregory IX (Latin: Decretales Gregorii IX), also collectively called the Liber extra, are a source of medieval Catholic canon law. In 1230, Pope Gregory IX ordered his chaplain and confessor, Raymond of Penyafort, a Dominican, to form a new canonical collection destined to replace the Decretum Gratiani, which was the chief collection of legal writings for the church for over 90 years. It has been said that the pope used these letters to emphasize his power over the Universal Church.

== Political circumstances ==
During Gregory IX's papacy, the church had established a prominent role in the temporal and spiritual affairs of Europe. Following his predecessor, Pope Honorius III, Gregory maintained papal supremacy. Nevertheless, the utility of a new collection was so evident that there may be no other motives than those the pope gives in the Bull Rex pacificus of 5 September 1234, the inconvenience of referring to several collections containing decisions most diverse and sometimes contradictory, exhibiting in some cases gaps and in others tedious length; moreover, on several matters the law was uncertain.

== Work of St. Raymond ==
The Quinque compilationes antiquæ was a series of five of these collections of pontifical legislation from the Decretum of Gratian (c. 1150) to the pontificate of Honorius III (1216–1227). Raymond of Peñafort followed the method of the Quinque compilationes in compiling the new collection of canons, which he completed in about four years. He borrowed from the Quinque compilationes the order of the subject-matter, the division of the work into five books, of the books into titles, and of the titles into chapters. Of the 1971 chapters the Decretals of Gregory IX contain, 1771 are from the Quinque compilationes, 191 are from Gregory IX himself, seven from decretals of Innocent III not inserted in the former collections, and two of unknown origin. They are arranged, generally, according to the order of the ancient collections, i.e., each title opens with the chapters of the first collection, followed by those of the second, and so on in regular order. Next come those of Innocent III, and finally those of Gregory IX. Almost all the rubrics, or headings of the titles, have also been borrowed from these collections, but several have been modified as regards detail. This method considerably lightened St. Raymond's task.

== Editorial work ==
Gregory's work involved the compilation of documents from former collections, modifying some decisions whilst discarding others. Additionally, Gregory omitted parts when he considered it prudent to do so, filled in the gaps, and cleared up doubtful points of the ancient ecclesiastical law by adding some new decretals to ensure his work was clear and concordant. He indicated by the words et infra the passages excised by him in the former collections. They are called partes decisae. The new compilation bore no special title, but was called "Decretales Gregorii IX" or sometimes "Compilatio sexta", i. e. the sixth collection with reference to the "Quinque compilationes antiquæ". It was also called "Collectio seu liber extra", i. e. the collection of the laws not contained (vagantes extra) in the "Decretum" of Gratian; hence the custom of denoting this collection by the letter X (i.e. extra, here not the Roman numeral for ten).

== Force of law ==
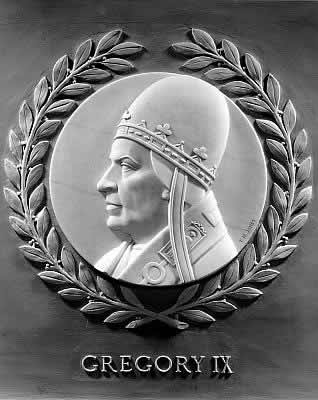
Gregory IX is portrayed among the great lawgivers of history by a bas-relief in the US House of Representatives chamber

While the Liber Extra was neither formally designated as a code nor officially promulgated as such, many scholars nevertheless regard it as a de facto codification of canon law—or at minimum, as something approximating a codification very closely. There is scholarly disagreement about the precise legal authority of those decretals that were not incorporated into the Liber Extra. This debate is particularly pronounced concerning decretals dating from the period before Gratian's work. In contrast to the uncertainty surrounding earlier materials, the situation for decretal letters issued during the period between Gratian's compilation and 1234 is clearer. Gregory IX in Rex pacificus explicitly established that such decretals retained legal force only to the extent that they had been included in the new compilation (that is, the Liber Extra) and only in the form found there. Those not included ceased to have binding legal authority; the passages left out by Raimund (known as partes decisae) However, in practice legal scholars continued to cite older collections, decretals not contained in the Liber Extra, and the partes decisae.

== Glosses ==
Like the former canonical collections, the Decretals of Gregory IX were soon glossed. It was customary to add to the manuscript copies textual explanations written between the lines (glossa interlinearis) and on the margin of the page (glossa marginalis). Explanations of the subject-matter were also added. The most ancient glossarist of the Decretals of Gregory IX is Vincent of Spain; then follow Godefridus de Trano (died 1245), Bonaguida Aretinus (thirteenth century) and Bernard of Botone or Parmensis (died 1263), the author of the "Glossa ordinaria", i.e., of that gloss to which authoritative credence was generally given. At a later date some extracts were added to the "Glossa ordinaria" from the "Novella sive commentarius in decretales epistolas Gregorii IX" by Giovanni d'Andrea (Johannes Andreæ).

== Manuscripts and printed editions ==
During the Middle Ages, the Liber Extra was copied very frequently. The number of extant manuscripts suggests that no other legal text was more widely known in the later Middle Ages. After the invention of printing, the Decretals of Gregory IX were first published at Strasburg from the press of Heinrich Eggestein. Among the numerous editions that followed, special mention must be made of that published in 1582 (in dibus populi romani) by order of Gregory XIII. The text of this edition, revised by the Correctores Romani, a pontifical commission established for the revision of the text of the "Corpus Juris", had the force of canon law, even when it differed from that of St. Raymond. It was forbidden to introduce any change into that text (Papal Brief "Cum pro munere", 1 July 1580). Among the other editions, mention may be made of that by Le Conte (Antwerp, 1570), of prior date to the Roman edition and containing the partes decis; that of the brothers Pithou (Paris, 1687); that of Böhmer (Halle, 1747), which did not reproduce the text of the Roman edition and was in its textual criticism more audacious than happy; the edition of Richter; and that of Friedberg (Leipzig, 1879-1881). All these authors added critical notes and the partes decis.

== Commentators ==
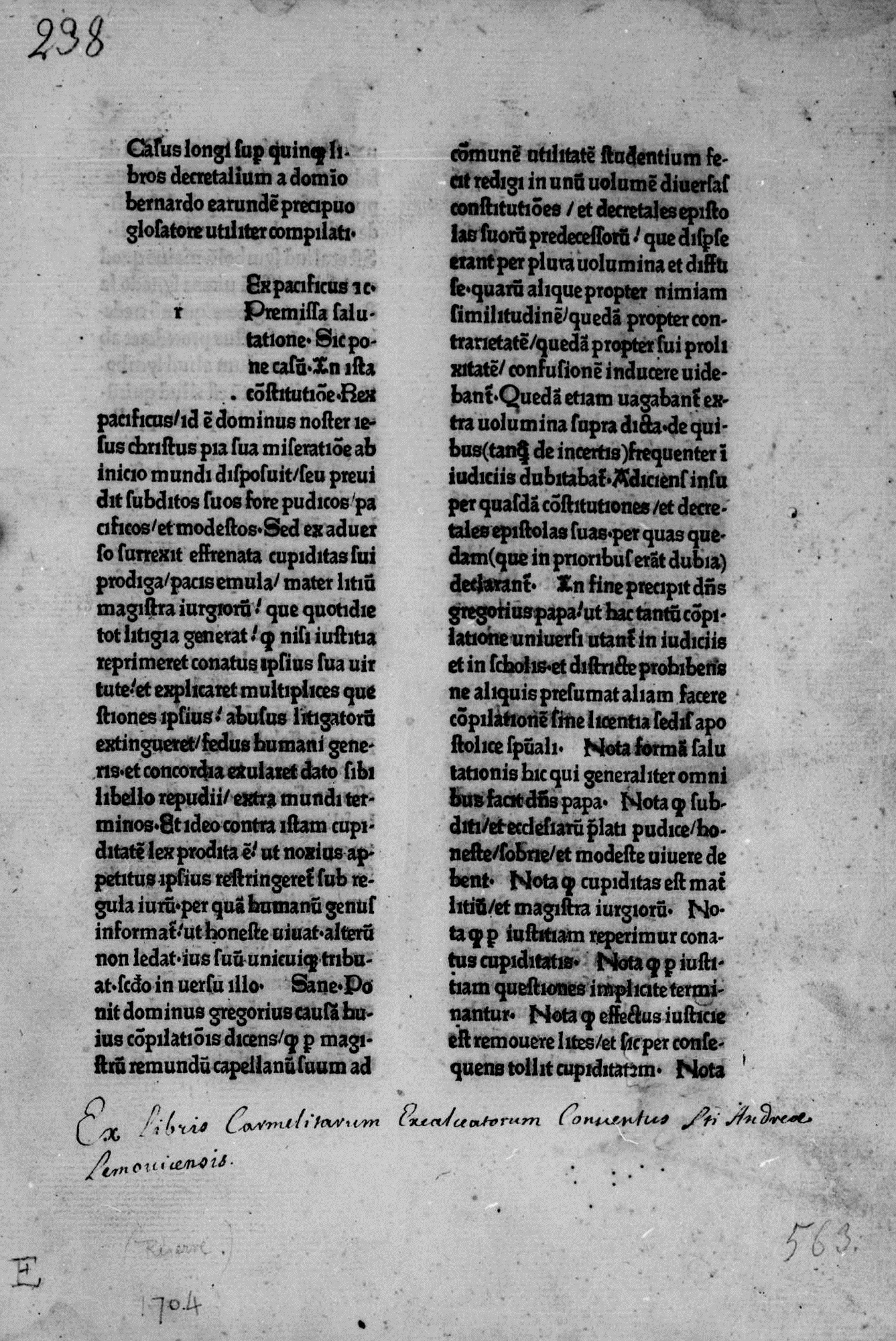
Bernard of Botone, Casus longi super quinque libros Decretalium, 1475

To indicate the principal commentators on the Decretals would mean writing a history of canon law in the Middle Ages. Important canonists include Innocent IV (died 1254), Enrico de Segusio or Hostiensis (died 1271), the "Abbas antiquus" (thirteenth century), Johannes Andreæ, Baldus de Ubaldis (died 1400), Petrus de Ancharano (died 1416), Franciscus de Zabarellis (died 1417), Dominicus a Sancto Geminiano (fifteenth century), Joannes de Imola (died 1436) and Nicolò Tudesco also called the "Abbas Siculus", or "Modernus", or "Panormitanus" (died 1453). Among the modern commentators, Manuel Gonzalez Tellez and Fagnanus may be consulted advantageously for the interpretation of the text of the Decretals. The Decretals of Gregory IX remain the basis of canon law so far as it has not been modified by subsequent collections and by the general laws of the Church (see Corpus Juris Canonici).

== Bibliography ==
- Bellomo, M. (1995). The Common Legal Past of Europe, 1000–1800. Studies in Medieval and Early Modern Canon Law 4.
- Bertram, Martin (2024-07-31). "List of Liber Extra manuscripts". Clavis canonum – Selected Canon Law Collections, ca. 500–1234: Handbook and Database. Monumenta Germaniae Historica.
- Bertram, M. (2015). "Überlegungen zu einem qualifizierten Überlieferungsbild der Dekretalen Gregors IX. (Liber Extra)". In Carmassi, P., Drossbach, G. (eds.). Rechtshandschriften des deutschen Mittelalters. Produktionsorte und Importwege. Wolfenbütteler Mittelalter-Studien 29. Harrassowitz. pp. 285–302. ISBN 978-3-447-10293-3.
- Bertram M (2002). "Die Dekretalen Gregors IX. – Kompilation oder Kodifikation?". In Longo, C. (ed.). Magister Raimundus. Atti del Convegno per il IV Centenario della Canonizzazione di San Raimondo de Penyafort (1601–2001) (in German). Rome: Istituto storico domenicano. pp. 61–86. ISBN 978-8888660936.
- Rolker, Christof (2024-07-03). "Liber Extra". Clavis canonum – Selected Canon Law Collections, ca. 500–1234: Handbook and Database. Monumenta Germaniae Historica.
- Thier, Andreas (2008). "Corpus Iuris Canonici". Handwörterbuch zur deutschen Rechtsgeschichte (in German). Vol. 1. Berlin: ESV. pp. 894–901.
- Winroth, A. (2022). "Canon Law in a Time of Renewal, 1130–1234". In Winroth, A., Wei, J. C. (eds.). The Cambridge History of Medieval Canon Law. Cambridge University Press. pp. 96–107. ISBN 978-1-139-17722-1.
