= Bernard of Botone =

Italian canonist

Bernard of Botone (date of birth unknown; d. 1263, or, according to Hurter, 24 March 1266) was a noted Italian canonist of the thirteenth century. He is generally called Bern(h)ardus Parmensis or Bernard of Parma, from his birthplace Parma.

He studied in Bologna, under Tancred, where later he accepted the chair of canon law. Here Durantis was his disciple. According to the inscription on his tombstone he was Chancellor of the University of Bologna. Bernard obtained a canonry in the Cathedral of Bologna, and was also named chaplain to Pope Innocent IV and Pope Alexander IV, by whom he was employed in solving questions of weight.

== Works ==
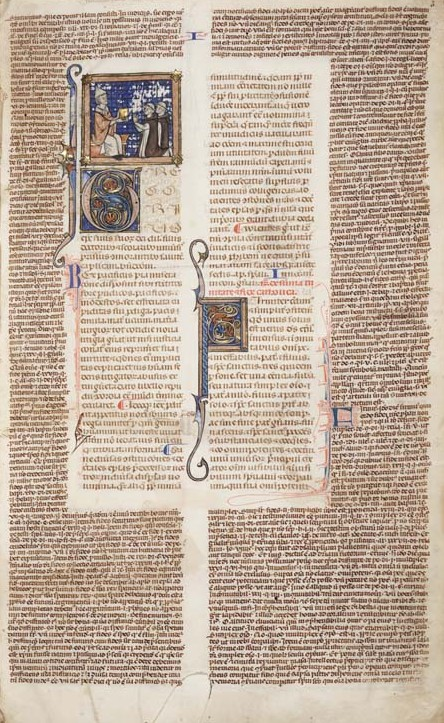
Decretals with Glossa ordinaria

Bernard found ample scope for his literary activity in his chosen branch, canon law. From glosses, summaries, and similar works, which had appeared on the Decretals of Gregory IX and other collections, he completed, just before his death, a work on the Gregorian Decretals. This, owing to his exact knowledge of former collections and thorough grasp of his subject, won for him the admiration of his contemporaries; so that he was styled "Glossator", and his work, commonly known as Glossa Ordinaria, became the fruitful source of later glosses, which were printed with Gregory's collection.

Bernard was careful to note what he had taken from others, while his own comments were signed "Bern."

Another work, entitled "Summa super Titulis Decretalium", was based on similar writings of his master, Tancred, of Bernard of Pavia and others. It is a clear, concise treatise, found in the works of Nicolaus de Tudeschis (Milan, five volumes in folio).

== Editions ==
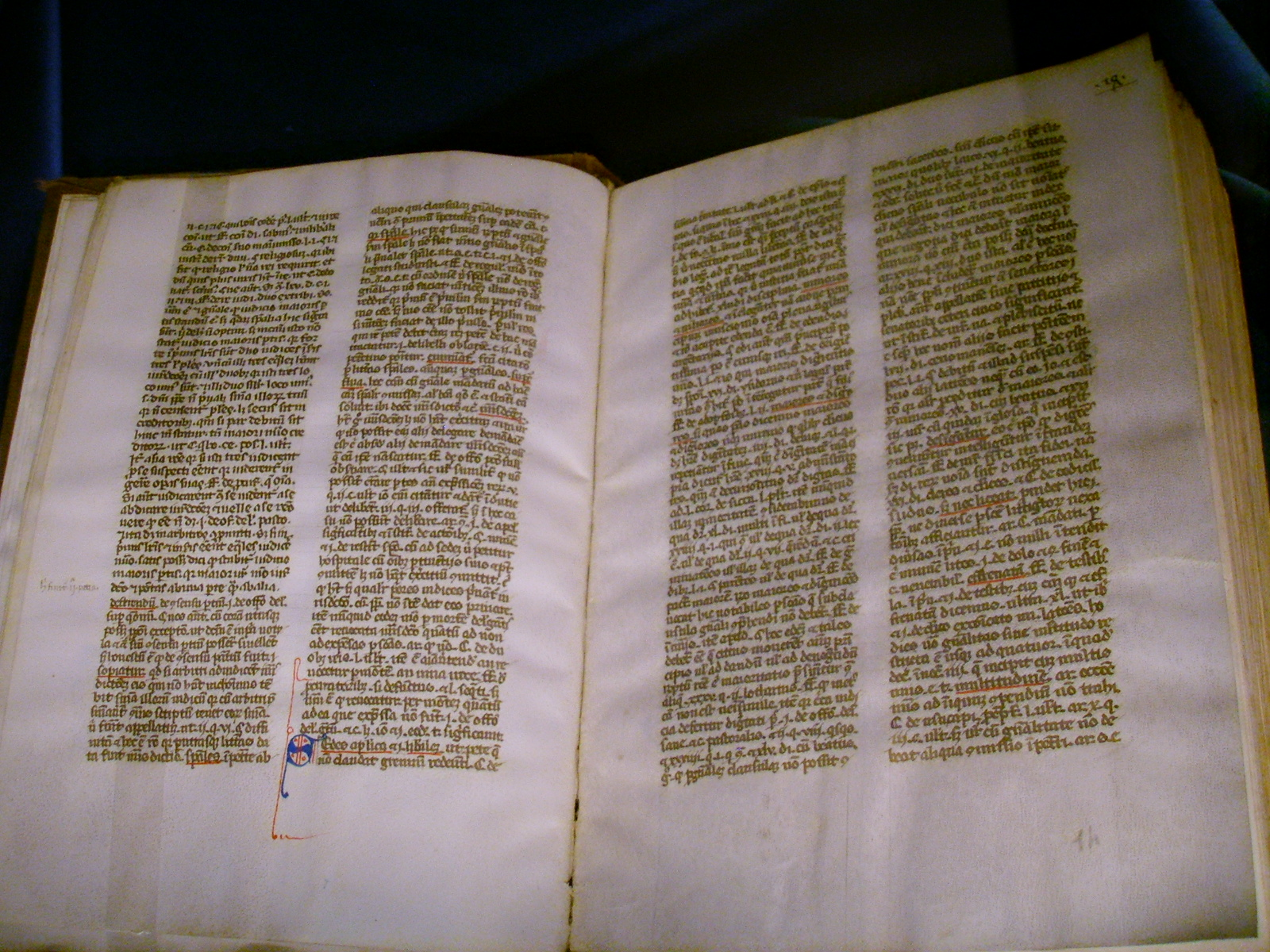
Glossa ordinaria in decretales

The Glossa Ordinaria was given to the press in Mainz in 1472, 1473, and in Rome in 1474. In this Roman edition there are additions, especially from the Novella Commentaria of Giovanni Andrea (d. 1348).

Bernard's "Casus Longi" on separate chapters of the same Gregorian Decretals was frequently edited: Paris, 1475; Venice, 1477; Bologna, 1487; Strasburg, 1488, 1493; Lyons, 1500.

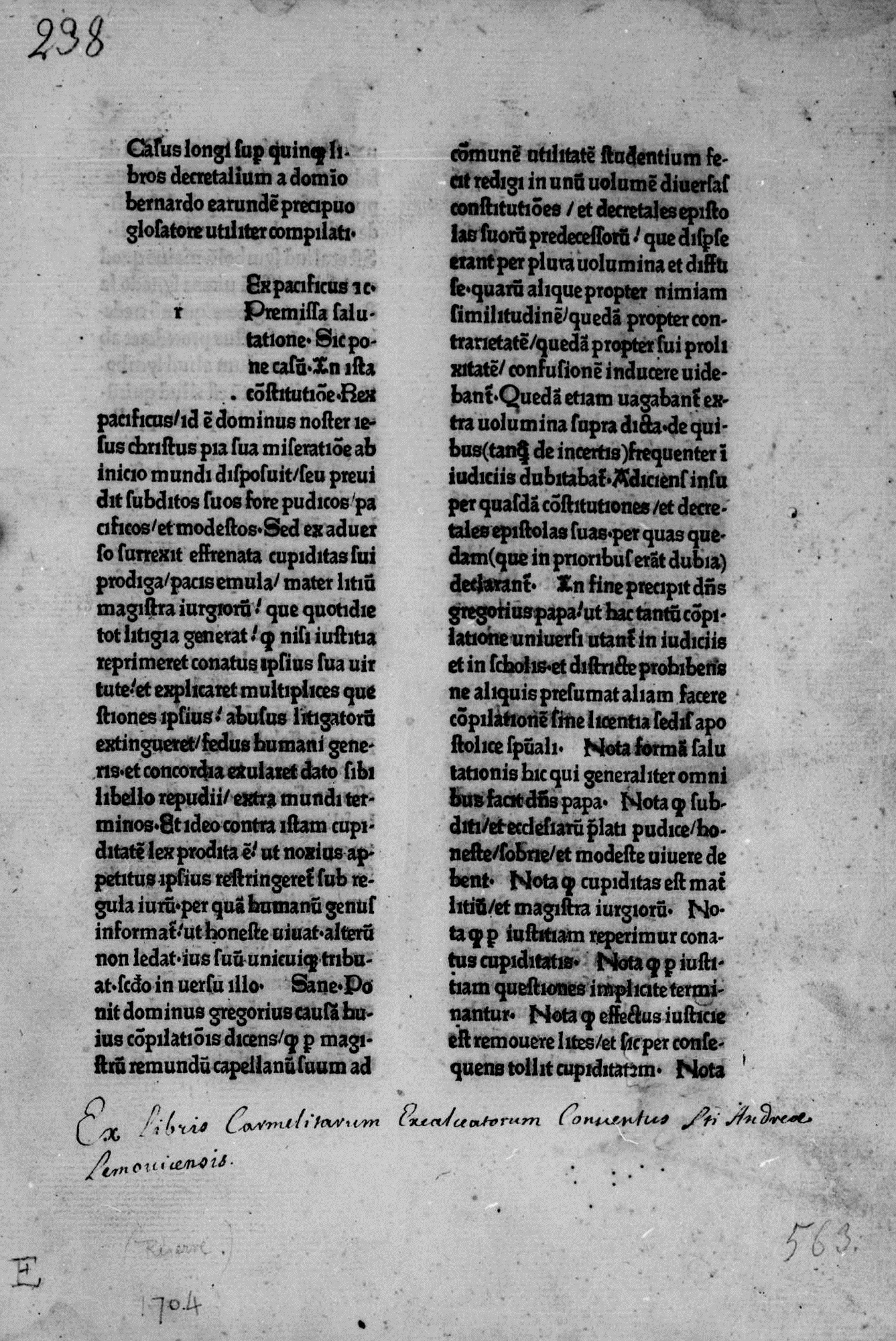
Casus longi super quinque libros Decretalium, Paris 1475
