= List of medieval Latin abbreviations =

Examples of sigla in use in the Middle Ages:

== A ==
- ā—annus or aut.
- á—aut.
- Ắ—Antiphona.
- a'—antiphona or autem.
- a.—annus.
- A.—Accursius or Albericus.
- A:—Amen.
- ab.—Abbas.
- abbāssa—Abbatissa.
- abd.—Abdiæ.
- ābl'a—ambula.
- abl'o—ablatio.
- ābl'o—ambulatio.
- abl'om—ablationem.
- abłtm—ablativum.
- abłto—ablativo.
- abñia—absentia.
- absol'em—absolutionem.
- abst°—abstractio.
- absʒ—absque.
- A·B·T·—Annua...Bima...Trima.
- ābul'oʒ—ambulationem.
- a.C.—anno Christi or ante Christum.
- acciˢ—accidens.
- accֆ—accipe.
- acci~—accipitur.
- accⁿal'r—accidentaliter.
- Accu—(De) Accusationibus.
- Accur.—Accursius.
- a'cls—æcclesia or ecclesia.
- a.C.n.—ante Christum natum.
- ac°—actio.
- act'.—Actus (Apostolorum).
- actā—activa.
- actˡ'ʳ—actualiter.
- A.D.—Anno Domini.
- ađ—aliud.
- addʒ—adderet.
- adħ—adhuc.
- A.D.I. or A.D.J.—Anno Dominicæ Incarnationis.
- AD·N·—adiutor numerorum.
- adń—ad nomen.
- adnˡ'ʒ—adnihilet.
- ad°—(ex) adverso or aliquod.
- adq—adque, atque.
- a·d·r·—anno dominicæ resurrectionis.
- adˢ—adversus.
- adʒ—adest.
- ad=t—adesset.
- A·E·C·E·U—At ego contra eam vindico.
- AF—affectus.
- AF·—ad finem.
- A·F·—ante factum or actum fide.
- A·F·F·—Annum faustum felicem.
- aff°—affirmatio.
- agð—agendum.
- agẽ—agere.
- agg.—Aggei (Prophetia).
- āgl'—angelis.
- āgl's—angelus.
- AG·MAG·D—Agens Magistratum dixit.
- AḠN·—Agnus.
- agʳ—agitur.
- āḡsti—Augusti.
- AG·V—Agens vices.
- aīał—animalis.
- aīe—animæ.
- a'is—aliis.
- al.—Albertus, Albericus, alibi.
- al' or aˡ—animal.
- ała—alia.
- Alb.—Albericus or Albertus (Papiensis).
- ald'—aliud.
- Ald.—Aldricus.
- al'e—animale.
- al'ia—animalia.
- all or allā—alleluia.
- All—Allegata.
- ałł—alliis (aliis).
- Ałł.—Allegoria.
- ałn—aliquando.
- Al.pa.—Albertus papiensis.
- alŕ—aliter.
- ałs—alias or aliis.
- alủiˢ—alumnis.
- Aλ—Talentum.
- A.M.—Ave Maria.
- āmīcl'o—amminiculo.
- amí9—amicum.
- āmoʳ—amovetur.
- AÑ—anni.
- aⁿ—ante.
- anatħa—anathema.
- A.N.D.—Anno Nativitatis Domini.
- anđ—Andegavensis.
- anđca—antedicta.
- Ang.—Angelus (de Perusio).
- angł or anˡ'—angelis.
- annłis—annualis.
- annłr—annualiter.
- ANN·P—Annonæ Præfectus.
- an.o.—ante omnia.
- Ant.de.But.—Antonius de Butrio.
- anułł—a nulla (ora).
- Ańʒ—Anzianis.
- ãor—maior.
- a°s—alios.
- a°t—aliquot.
- Ap.—(De) appellationibus.
- apd'—apud.
- apłi—Apostoli.
- apłs—apostolus.
- A·P·M·—annorum plus minus.
- ap. ob. re.—appellationis obstaculo remoto.
- Aposta.—(De) Apostatis.
- apostłs—apostolus.
- appeˡ'—appetibilis.
- appell.rē.—appellatione remota.
- appłłois—appellationis.
- A·P·PO—apud præfectum prætorio.
- appōm—appositionem.
- appʳ—appellatur or appretiator.
- aprł—aprilis.
- aps—apostolus.
- A·P·T·—ad potestatem tuam.
- AQI·S·—Aquilana Stipulatio.
- Ar.—Ardizione (Jacopo di) or argumentum.
- aʳ—aliter or maior.
- a'r—a meridie.
- Arbí.—(De) Arbitris.
- Arch.—Archidiaconus.
- archð—archidiaconus.
- arcħi—archiepiscopi
- Arch·M·—Archiepiscopatus Mediolani.
- arcħo or arcħopo—archiepiscopo.
- Arg.—Argumentum.
- āres—maiores.
- arłos—articulos.
- ar°—arbitrio, argumento, arguo, articulo.
- arʳ—argumentatur.
- arta°—arctatio.
- artiˡ'—articulis.
- artˣ—artifex.
- aˢ—alias or antecedens.
- A·S·L·F·—a sua lege fecit.
- assig°—assignatio.
- assiłatur—assimilatur.
- assʒʳ—assentitur.
- At.C.—Ante Christum.
- atⁿ or attⁿ—attamen.
- atq· or atʒ or at7—atque.
- Au.—Aurum.
- AU·—Augustus.
- aú—autem.
- aủ—aut.
- a·u·c·—anno Urbis conditæ.
- auð—audiat or audituris.
- au. de ca.—auri de camera (ducali).
- auðʳ—auditur.
- auētʳe—aventuræ.
- aūg—augusti or augusto.
- Auḡni—Augustini.
- au°ʳ—auctor.
- A·U·PɔS·—agens vicem Proconsulis.
- authâs—authoritas.
- authen.—authentica or authenticorum.
- avūclī—avunculi.
- awncłs—avunculus.

== B ==
- B—8.
- b.—...bus.
- B.—Beatus, Bernhardus, Bulgarus.
- b: or B:—...bus.
- b;—...bus or ...bet.
- ·b'·—Bernhardus.
- bʒ—...bus or ...bet.
- b7—...bus.
- babł—Babylonis.
- Bal. or Bald.—Baldus.
- bałł.—balliviæ or ballivis.
- Band.—Bandinus.
- bar.—Baruch.
- Bartħs—Bartholomœus.
- B·C·—bonorum curator.
- BCA·—bona caduca.
- BĒO—Bonorum emptio.
- b.f.—bona fides.
- B·F·C·—Bonæ fidei contractus.
- BFD—Beneficium dedit.
- BFO—beneficio.
- B·G·—Bona gratia.
- B·H·—Bona Hereditaria.
- bib'r—bibitur.
- bīfiʳ—beatificari.
- błas—bladas or blavis.
- błłi—belli.
- bll'm—bellum.
- bḿ—bonæ memoriæ.
- B·M·—Boni Mores or Bona Materna.
- B.M.—Beata Maria, Beata Mater, Benemeritus.
- B·MN—Bona Munera.
- bnđ.—benedicti.
- bõ—bona.
- BŌF—Bona Fortuna or Bonum Factum.
- bo.me.—bonæ memoriæ.
- Borcħ—Borchardus.
- borð—bordarius.
- bōs—beatos or bonos.
- BP—Bonorum Possessio.
- B.P.—Beatissime Patre, Beatus Paulus, Beatus Petrus.
- BR—Bonorum.
- BR.—breve.
- bʳ—breviter.
- bŕaui—breviavi.
- bs—...bus.
- b's—beatus.
- B·U·—Bona vacantia.
- Bul. or Bulg.—Bulgarus.
- But.—Butrius.
- B.V.—Beata Virgo, Beatitudinis Vestræ, bene vale, bene valeatis.
- bz—...bet.

== C ==
- C—Antisigma.
- C.—Caput, Celestinus, centum, Codex, Comes, Congius.
- c.—canonis, capitulus, centesimo, civis, confessor, conversus.
- ĉ.—confessor or conversus.
- Ca.—caput.
- cal'—caloris.
- cała—calida or cartula.
- cal'aʒ—calidam.
- cal'e—calidæ.
- całē—caliditatem.
- Call.—Calligarius.
- całs—calidus.
- canłí—canoniali.
- cānʳ—causantur.
- cant.—canticum.
- ca°—capitulo.
- capð—capud (caput).
- capełł—capellanis.
- capel.mo.—(De) capellis monachorum.
- capełs—capellanus.
- CAPL—Capitula.
- capłło—capellano.
- capl'm—capitulum.
- capˢ—capitulus.
- caŕ—caruca.
- Card.—Cardinalis.
- cardił—cardinalis.
- cãre—curare.
- carîa—carmina.
- carl.—carlenus.
- carł—cartula.
- cãsal'—causalis.
- cast°—castro.
- c'at—creat.
- cāu—casu.
- cauˡ'—causalis.
- caůnno—Cavronno.
- Caz. or Caza.—Cazavillanus.
- C·C·—calumniæ causa.
- CC.—Carissimus (also plur. Carissimi), Clarissimus, Circum.
- čč—contra.
- c'ca—circa.
- C·C·E·—causa conventa est.
- ɔcʳrit—concurrit.
- ɔceʳ—conceditur.
- ɔcło—conclusio.
- CC.PP.—Clarissimi Pueri.
- ɔd'e—concedere.
- ɔdêpnʒ—condempnet.
- ɔd°—conditio.
- ɔē—commune.
- ceł—celebravit.
- Censi.—(De) Censibus.
- cetʳo—cetero.
- ɔfcoʒ—confectionem.
- ɔfō—confessio.
- ɔfˢ—confessoris.
- CH·—Christus.
- cħ.—chorus.
- cħar—chartam.
- cħr—Charintiæ.
- C.I.—Codex Iustiniani.
- Cí.—Civem or Civis.
- CIII—8 or VIII.
- Cip.—Ciprianus.
- circło—circulo.
- cir9l'o—circumlocutio.
- cỉs—cæteris.
- cister.—cisterciensis.
- cit.—citatio.
- ciúe—civitate.
- ɔiug—coniugis.
- ciuil'r—civiliter.
- ćiux—coniux.
- cl.—clarissimus or clericus.
- Cla.—Clarasci (Cherasco).
- cła—Clavenna.
- clasła—clausula.
- cłci—clerici.
- cłcs—clericus.
- Cle.—Clementinæ or Clementinis.
- Cle. pe.—(De) Clericis peregrinis.
- Cle.pug.īdu.—(De) Clericis pugnantibus in duello.
- Cler.vena.—(De) Clerico venatore.
- CL·F·—Classis forensis.
- cłicis—clericis.
- çlḿ—cœlum.
- cłr—clericus.
- cl.u·—Clarissimus vir.
- cl·uu·—clarissimorum virorum.
- CL.V—Clarissimus vir.
- ₵M·—Causa mortis or Civitatis Mediolani.
- C·M·F·—Clarissimæ memoriæ fœmina.
- C.mo—centesimo.
- ɔm°—commodo.
- C·N·EE·C·C·—credimus non esse causa conventa.
- cnł—concilio.
- cnło—concilio.
- ɔ°—communicatio or conclusio.
- Co. or Colun—Columbus.
- Cod. Theod.—Codex Theodosianus.
- cōfoēs—confessiones.
- Cog.le.—(De) cognatione legali.
- cogn—cognomina.
- Cog. spi.—(De) cognatione spirituali.
- coḡtis—consanguinitatis.
- cohāo—cohabitatio.
- ₵oħas—Coherentias.
- coħiis—coherenciis.
- coħt—cohæret.
- cõiˢ—communis.
- col'—coloris.
- Col.—Colossenses (epistola ad).
- coła—colera or copula.
- coll'ʳ—colligitur.
- Collu.dete.—(De) collusione detegenda.
- cołłʒ—collationem.
- col'ʳ—colitur.
- Com.—Comitatus or Comitibus.
- Commo.—(De) Commodato.
- comʳ—communiter.
- con.—concordat, confessor, consecratione.
- conđni—conditioni.
- conf.—confinans.
- Confes.—(De) Confessis.
- Confir.uti.—(De) Confirmatione utili.
- Confʃ—confessoris.
- ₵ons.—Consecratione or Consularis.
- ₵onst.—Constantinopolis.
- consunt~—conservantur.
- Con.t.t.r.—consultationis tue taliter respondemus.
- co°ʳ—commentator.
- ₵or.—Corinthios.
- corði—corrigendi.
- corl—corneliensis.
- corr°e—corruptione.
- c'ot'—cerotum.
- C·P·—Clarissime Puer.
- ɔpaⁿˢ—compatiens.
- ćpł—complevi.
- ɔpl'atʳ—copulatur.
- cporís—corporis.
- ɔqʳ—conqueritur.
- CQSF·—Cumque suscepta fuisset.
- cʳ or c~—cur.
- cʳandi—curandi.
- cʳant—curant.
- cʳo—curo.
- ćs—cui supra.
- c'sc'—crescit.
- c'sc'e—crescere.
- C·S·Fl—cum suis filiis.
- ɔstitd'—constituendum.
- c.t.—celsitudo tua or certum tempus.
- Cu.—Cuprum.
- cū—cum.
- ćũsi—conversi.
- C.V.—Celsitudinis Vestræ.
- Cy—Cynus or Cyprianus.
- Cyp—Cyprianus.
- Cẏst—Cysterciensis.
- c'ʒ—cuique.
- ć9—circum.
- c9lʒ—cuiuslibet.

== D ==
- d—2.
- d.—distinctio.
- D.—Deus, Dixit, Dominicus, Dominus, Dux. (plural: DD)
- d'—dominicæ.
- đ'—dominus.
- đ.—denarii, dies, dimida, dimidium.
- ð—de.
- dab'—dabis.
- dam;—damus.
- Dama.—Damasus.
- dāp°i—dampnationi.
- dap.7.dīs.—dampni et dispendii.
- d'bʒ—debet.
- db7—debet.
- đca—dicta.
- ðcf—de confinio.
- d'co—dicto.
- D·C·S·—de consiliis sententia.
- dd or d'd'—dicendum.
- dđ—danda or dedit.
- đđ—David, dedi, dedit.
- đđa—dicenda or docenda.
- D·D·E·—dare damnas esto.
- d'dē—dedere.
- dði—dictandi.
- đði—dicendi.
- ddīs—dicendis.
- dđit· or đđrít—dederit.
- dd'o—dicendo.
- d'd'rūt—dederunt.
- debʒ—debet.
- decl'ioe—declinatione.
- decl'om—declarationem.
- dee—deest.
- defđ—defendit.
- delic.pu.—(De) delictis puerorum.
- dep.—depuratus.
- dep°—deputatio.
- depōi—depositioni.
- depʒ—dependet.
- DEQ·AG·H·D—de quo agitur hodierna die.
- dēt—debet.
- ðet—daret.
- deuol.—devolutum.
- DFP—dare facere præstare.
- DFQ·—domi forisque.
- dī—Dei.
- diacõ—diaconus.
- dĩd' or ðīð—deinde.
- dīða—dividenda.
- dīdat—dividat.
- d'idi—dividi.
- dīd°—dimidio.
- dīdʳ—dividitur.
- d'ie—divinæ.
- ðie—dictæ.
- diffō—diffinitio (definitio).
- DIḠ·M·—dignus memoriæ.
- d'iˡ'—divisibilis.
- dił—dilectis.
- Díla.—(De) Dilationibus.
- diłci—dilecti.
- diłcois—dilectionis.
- diłc9—dilectus.
- diło—dilectio.
- dil'oi—dilationi.
- ðim—dimidiam or dimidium.
- dimið—dimidium.
- dīs—dispendii, dispendio, divisim.
- discpłs—discipulus.
- dispłi—discipuli.
- dist°—distincto.
- distʳ—distinguitur.
- dis.ue.—discretioni vestræ.
- dĩtʳ—duriter.
- diuiˡ'—divisibilis.
- diũo—divorcio.
- dixt—dixit.
- D·JHS·—Dominus Jesus.
- D·L·—do lego.
- đł—dilectissimi.
- dl'ce—dulce.
- DLM—dolus malus.
- DM·—demum.
- d'm°—dummodo.
- D·M·V·—Devotæ Memoriæ Vir.
- D.N.—Dominus noster.
- dń—domino nostro.
- dña—domina.
- dñd'—dicendum.
- D·N·E·—dubium non est.
- dñi—domini.
- đnicę—dominicæ.
- dńm—dominum.
- DNN—Domini.
- dńo—Domino.
- DNP—dubitari non potest.
- D.N.PP.—Dominus noster Papa.
- DNQ—Dominusque.
- DÑS—Dominus.
- dñti—dicenti.
- D·O·—Deo Optimo or Deus Omnipotens.
- dõ—Deo.
- d'o—domini.
- docʒ—docet.
- D.O.M.—Deo Optimo Maximo.
- dóm—domini.
- doḿs—dominus.
- DŌN—Dominum.
- d°nes—dictiones.
- đonū—dominum.
- do°—dominio.
- d°o—domino.
- dot.—dotatione.
- DP·—de periculo.
- D·P·—de pecunia or dimidia pars.
- D·P·F·—denuntiandi potestatem fecit.
- d.pp.—denariorum papiensium.
- dŕ or dʳ—dicitur.
- ḑŕ—dicitur.
- DRP—de re publica.
- dś—Deus.
- D·S·A·—diversæ scholæ auctores.
- DT—dotis tempore.
- ðt—debet.
- dubō—dubitatio.
- dubʳ—dubitatur.
- duc°—ducentesimo.
- duc.pp.—ducatus papiensis.
- du°—dubio.
- dū°—dummodo.
- d'ut'.—deuteronomii (liber).
- D.V.—Deus vult (God willing)
- dvucto—ducentesimo.
- dˣ—duplex.
- dxt—dixit.

== E ==
- ·e·—ecclesiæ or est.
- E—oboli quinque.
- Ē or ē—enim or est.
- easd'—easdem.
- e'at—erat.
- ebd'—ebdomadæ.
- ęccła—aecclesia.
- eccłiis—ecclesiis.
- eɔ°—e contrario.
- eđđ'—edendum.
- EDĒ—eiusdem.
- ẽẽt—esset.
- EG·—egerunt or ergo.
- egðr—egreditur.
- eg°—ægro.
- eg°tus—ægrotus.
- egłij—evangelii.
- egłm—evangelium.
- eg'onẻ—egestionem.
- eg°ni—ægrotationi.
- eiʒ—enim.
- Eĵ—ergo.
- eł'ari—elementari.
- el'ea—eleemosyna.
- el'i—elementi.
- el'ium—elixirium.
- ell'us—elleborus.
- el'm—elementum.
- el'osinā—eleemosynam.
- el'tis—elementis.
- el'ʒ—elementum.
- empl'o—emplastro.
- eoð—eodem.
- epal'—episcopalis.
- epħ.—Ephesios (Epistula Pauli ad).
- ēpi°—empyreo.
- epis—episcopus.
- ep'is—epatis.
- episc—episcopum.
- ẻpl'm—emplastrum.
- epsco—episcopo.
- E·R·A·—ea res agitur.
- erpf—Erpfordia (Erffordia).
- ET·NC—etiam nunc.
- ẽto—æquato.
- EUG—Evangelii.
- ęugłia—ævangelia.
- eugłtę—evangelistæ.
- euict.—evictio or evictionis.
- euiⁿˢ—evidens.
- ewła—ewangelista.
- ewn°—ewangelio.
- EX·C·—ex consuetudine.
- excantʳ—excusantur.
- expll'r—expellitur.
- expl'oi—expulsioni.
- exūt—exeunte.
- ezecħ—Ezechielis.
- e&—esset.
- e9°—e contrario.

== F ==
- F—Fundus or oboliquatuor.
- F.—Filius or frater (plural: FF.)
- ·F·—Fridericus.
- facʳ or faʳ—faciliter.
- fall'e or fll'e—fallaciæ.
- F·C·—fiduciæ causa.
- F·C·L·—fraudationis causa latitat.
- FD—fideiussor.
- F·E·—filius eius.
- feł.—feliciter.
- ff—fines.
- fí or fi'—fieri.
- fiāʳ—finaliter.
- fideʳ—fideliter.
- figʳe—figuræ.
- fiˡ'—finalis.
- fin'i—finiri.
- fi°—filio.
- FION·—fideiussionem.
- fł—feliciter.
- fl'a—falsa or flegma.
- fl'ais—flaminis.
- fl'e—felle.
- fl'icis—flegmaticis.
- fll'a—fallacia.
- fllis—flagellis.
- fllor—flagellorum.
- fl's—falsum or famulus.
- flủs—falsus.
- fl'ʒ—falsum.
- F·M·—fati munus or fieri mandavit.
- FM·—forma.
- f'm'to—fermento.
- FO·—forte or fortes.
- fr—frater.
- fr.—fragmentum.
- FR᾿—Francorum.
- FRA—Francorum.
- f'râ—frigidam.
- frēm—fratrem.
- frī—fratri, frumenti, futuri.
- f'ria—feria.
- frīdaʒ—frigidam.
- frīm—frigidum.
- frūel'—fratruelis.
- FS·E· or F·S·E·—factus est or factum sic est.
- FŪT—fuerit.
- f·9—fuit confessus.

== G ==
- G—6 or VI.
- G.—Guarnerius.
- Ḡ—gratia or gaudium.
- g' or g~—igitur.
- Gałłte—Gallarate.
- gãst—gastaldus.
- G·B·—Gens bona.
- gcc—quia.
- G·D·—gens dolosa.
- GD·—gaudium.
- G.deCa.—Guillelmus de Cabriano.
- geň—genuit.
- ge9—genus.
- G·F·—germanus frater.
- G'ħ—Gerhardus.
- GI—7 or VII.
- GL—gloria or gloriosissimi.
- gła—gloria.
- głam—gloriam.
- GLD·—gloria decus.
- GL·F·—Gloriosa fœmina.
- gl'ifi°—glorificatio.
- głose—gloriosæ.
- G·M·—gens mala.
- GN·—genus.
- gn'is—generis.
- gñosa—generosa.
- gñtil'—gentilis.
- gn'ʒ—generet.
- g°.—ergo.
- g°ssos—grossos.
- GRV—Gravitas vestra.
- G·S—Gloriosa sedes.
- ḡts—gentes.
- Guar.—Guarnerius.
- guiðr—guiderdonum.
- ḡuiʳ—graviter.
- GUU—Gravitas vestra.
- GV—Gravitas vestra.
- Gz.—Guizardinus.

== H ==
- h—autem.
- H—Hugolinus.
- h'—huius.
- H'—Henricus.
- h,—hoc.
- h.—nihil.
- ħ—hac, hec, hæc, hoc.
- ḣ—hæc or hoc.
- Ħ—hora.
- hab'e—habere.
- hab'&—haberet.
- haīts—habitationis.
- ħ'ant—habeant.
- hāt—habeat.
- H·B·—hora bona or heres bonorum.
- h'bipoł—Herbipolensis.
- h῾c—huc.
- H.D.—hac die or hodierna die.
- h·d·—his diebus or hereditas divisa.
- ħđ—hac die, heredem, heredibus.
- hđs—heredibus.
- ħeđs—heredes.
- hēs—habemus.
- h'es—habens.
- h·f·—honesta fœmina, honorabilis fœmina, hic fundavit.
- ħħbus—heredibus.
- hh.ff.—honestis fœminis.
- h·i·—hereditario iure or heres institutus.
- h'i—huius.
- hīc—hinc.
- h'il'—habilis.
- hīnú—himnum.
- ħirł or hirłm—Hierusalem.
- h'ita—habita.
- hł—hludovicus, ludovicus.
- H·L·A·C·—Hac lege ad Consulem.
- H·L·N·—honesto loco natus.
- H·L·N·R·—Hac lege nihil rogatur.
- hluđ—hludovicus, ludovicus.
- ħmił—humilis.
- H·M·U·—honestæ memoriæ vir.
- ħndat—habundat.
- hn's—habens.
- hñtʳ—habentur.
- hō—homo.
- hö—hora.
- hōmij—homagii.
- h°ⁿ—hoc nomen.
- H·P·—hereditatis possessio, honesta persona, honestus puer, hora pessima.
- Hr.—Henricus.
- HRC·—honestæ recordationis.
- ħrd's—heredes.
- ħs—habes.
- h's—heres.
- h't—habet.
- H·U·—his verbis or honesta vita.
- hu'í—humidi.
- humłr—humiliter.
- ħūnt—habebunt.
- hús—heredibus.
- hỷno—hymno.
- h9i—huiusmodi.

== I ==
- ·i· or í.—id est.
- ī—insititutus.
- i'—in.
- I'—item.
- ia.—Iacobi (Epistula).
- ián—Ianuarii.
- I·B·—in brevi.
- I.C. or I.X.—Jesus Christus.
- i·c·—iuris consultus or intra circulum.
- īca.ie.—in capite ieiunii.
- I·C·E·—iure cautum est.
- I·C·E·U·—iusta causa esse videtur.
- īcl'om—inclinationem.
- id'—idem.
- id.—idem, idibus, idus.
- îd'—inde.
- iđ—idem, idest, idus.
- īđe—indictione.
- id'e—idem.
- īd'id°—individuo.
- īd'iˡ'—indivisibilis.
- I.D.N.—In Dei nomine.
- idñe—iurisdictione.
- I·D·P·—iuri dicundo præest.
- IE—Iudex esto.
- IE'—Ierusalem.
- IĒR—Jeronymus.
- íf—inlustris fœmina.
- ĩfcōm—infectionem.
- īfiˡ'—infidelis.
- īfl'o—inflammatio.
- i·f°·—in foro.
- I·F·CS·A·—in foro Cæsaris Augusti.
- îf'mi—infirmi.
- IG—ius gentium.
- ig°rat—ignorat.
- īh'e'—inhærere.
- iherłm—iherusalem.
- īhīcō—inhibicio.
- iħł—Israhel.
- iħs—Iesus.
- ih'u—Iesu.
- I·I·—in iure.
- I·I·C·—in iure cessit.
- îicio—inicio.
- iiijs—quatuor semis (4 ½)
- IIIO—tertio.
- IIIX—13.
- II°—duo.
- I·I·R·—in integrum restitutio.
- ĪJ—2000.
- I·L·—intra limitem or ius liberorum.
- I·L·D·—in loco divino.
- iłł—illis.
- ill'imis—illegitimis.
- illuīa—illumina.
- I·L·P·—in loco publico.
- i·l°·r·—in loco religioso.
- i·l°·s·—in loco sacro.
- IM'—Imperator.
- ·íḿ·—in mense.
- Iḿp.C.etd.ss.—Imperatore, Consule et die suprascriptis.
- inđ—Indictione.
- indī°—individuo.
- inđn—Indictione.
- ind'ra—indifferentia.
- infl'o—inflammatio.
- Inħlp—inlustris Patricii or Præfecti or Præfecturæ.
- in·in·—in integrum.
- ĩnocñe—innocentiæ.
- inpña—inpœnitentia.
- intl'ˡ'—intellectualis.
- int'pol'o—interpolatio.
- inʒ—inest.
- io·—Ioannis (Evangelium).
- I°—uno.
- IØ—10.
- IØI—101.
- Ioħ—Iohanne.
- i°°—illo modo.
- I'oʒ—ideoque.
- I·P·—in platea, in provincia, in publico.
- IP—ius prætorium.
- ip'—ipsius.
- ĩpl'oe—impulsione.
- īp9ˡ—impossibilis.
- i·q·—ius Quiritum.
- irl'm—Ierusalem.
- I·S·—iudicatum solvi or iudicium solvit.
- i·sł·—Israel.
- istd'—istud.
- istis—iamscriptis.
- istō—infrascripto.
- īst'o—institutio.
- I·T·—intra tempus.
- I·T·C·—infra tempus constitutum.
- îtēcoēʒ—intencionem.
- ītll'ia—intelligentia.
- ītll'r—intelligitur.
- ītll'x—intellexit.
- iū—iure.
- iudō—iudicio.
- iud·p·—iudicium potest.
- iuʳata—iurata.
- ·ī·xl—1040.
- i÷—id est.
- ī÷—inest.

== J ==
- j—1.
- J or ·J·—2, Iacobus, id est, Iesus.
- Ja de ra—Jacobus de Ravanis.
- Je.—Jeremiæ.
- Je'o9—Jeronymus.
- Jhū—Jesu.
- Jo.f.—Jonnes Faventius.
- Joħe or J°h'e—Johanne.
- Joħs—Johannes.
- JØ—10.
- Jurd°—Jurisdictio.

== K ==
- K—Kalumnia, Kapitulum, Capitulum, Kaput.
- K. or Ka. or Kar.—Karolus (de Tocco).
- ·K·—Kapitulo.
- KA'—Karolus.
- K·B·—karitas bona.
- kāl—kalendas.
- kałđrm—kalendarum.
- kałn—kalendas.
- kārtła—kartula.
- kk—kalumniæ kausa.
- KK.—Karissimus (or -mi).
- kld·—kalendas.
- Klrū—Kalendarum.
- kłs—kalendas or Karolus.
- KO—hemina.
- KR·—karitas.
- Kŕ—kalendarum.
- KR·P·—karitas pura.
- KRT—karitas tua.
- Ky—Cyathus.

== L ==
- l·—laudabilis.
- l;—licet.
- ł—laicus, laica, licet or vel.
- L'—Ludovicus.
- Ł—Lectio.
- La.—Lanfrancus (de Crema) or Laurentius.
- Lắ—laudam.
- Laf. or Lan.—Lanfrancus (de Crema).
- Łatḡ—Lantgravius.
- lb·—liberi.
- l·b·p·—locus bene possessus.
- l·c·—libertatis causa.
- ld·—laudandum.
- l·dd·—locus dedicatus.
- lg·—legavit or legem.
- LIA—quinquagesima prima.
- l'ima—legitima.
- li°—libro.
- liū—liviensis.
- ll·—laudabiles loci.
- L·M·D·—locus mortui deditus.
- L·M·P·—locus male possessus.
- ł'o—locutio.
- łoc—locatione.
- Lot.—Lotarius.
- lo°—loco.
- l·pl·—locus publicus.
- l'r—legitur.
- lu.—Lucæ (Evangelium)
- lʒ—licet.

== M ==
- M—Mulier.
- ḿ—manus or mense.
- ḿ.—milliaria.
- MAGD—Magistratus dixit.
- mala.—Malachiæ (Prophetia).
- Matħs—Matthæus.
- maʒ—manet.
- M·C·U·—manu conservatum vocavit.
- M·D—manu divina.
- M·D·O·—mihi dare oportet.
- m'e—mere.
- med'—medicus, medietas, medietatis.
- međte—medietate.
- mełł—melliorandum.
- m'emʳ—meremur.
- m'eʳ—meretur.
- MF·—manifestum.
- MF·F·—manifestum fecit.
- mgʳ—magister.
- mħ—mihi.
- m'i—miseri.
- mīaʒ—misericordiam.
- Mich'is—Michaelis.
- m'íís—matrimoniis.
- mił—miles.
- Miłł or Miłło or Miłłs or Mil°—Millesimo.
- m'io—matrimonio.
- mł—mille or milliaria.
- ml'a—multa.
- ml'cʒ—mulcet.
- młe—male.
- ml'iciˢ—melancholicis.
- ml'r or młr—mulier.
- ml't'—multum.
- ml'ta—multa.
- MM.—Magistri, Martyres, Matrimonium, Meritissimus.
- mo—modii.
- ḿo—monacus.
- mođ—modis.
- mod'—modia.
- moða—Modœcia.
- moˡ'—mobilis.
- molð—molendinum.
- monũ—monasterium.
- moʳ—movetur.
- ḿorú—modorum.
- mōt—monte.
- m°ū—modum.
- moʒ—movet.
- M.Pas.—M. Pascipoverus.
- M·P·D·—maiorem partem diei.
- m'r—meridie.
- Mʳ—Magister.
- mʳ—mater, materialiter, multipliciter.
- m'ríce'—matricem.
- mŕs—martyris.
- ms or ḿs—mense or meus.
- mˢ—mandamus, melius, mensis.
- mscđa—misericordia.

== N ==
- N—enim, nesciens, noster, Novellæ, numero.
- .N. or ·n·—enim.
- N·—Notitia.
- N'—Nicolaus.
- ñ—nostri.
- Ñ—Nomine.
- N'—nec.
- narr'o—narratio.
- narrʳ—narratur.
- nās—nostras.
- Natł—Natalem.
- naucłs—nauclearius.
- naʒ—nam.
- nãʒ—naturam.
- nāʒ—namque.
- NB—nobis.
- N·C—non certe.
- nc—nunc.
- ne—nomine.
- ned'—nedum.
- neḡ.ḡ.—negotiorum gestione.
- NḠA—negotia.
- nĩ—nostri.
- nicħ—nichil.
- niħ—nihil.
- NĪS—Nostris.
- nl—non licet, non liquet, non longe.
- nłła—nulla.
- nll'i—nulli.
- nllo°—nullo modo.
- nłłs—nullus.
- nˡ°—nihilo.
- n'm—numerum.
- nn—nomen.
- nⁿ—nomen or non.
- nõ—nomen.
- NO'—Nobilis.
- n°—nostro, nullo, numero.
- nōi—nomini.
- nol't—nolunt.
- noḿ—nomine.
- no°ʳ—nobilior.
- NŌP7—non oportet.
- NŌRI—nostri.
- NŌS—noster.
- Notās—Notarius.
- N·P·—nobili puero, non patet, non potest.
- n'quā—nunquam.
- nʳale—naturale.
- nʳe—naturæ.
- nʳm—numerum.
- nro—nostro.
- nʳs—numerus.
- N·S·E·—non sic est.
- N·U·—non vacat or non valet.
- ńú—nostro viro.
- nuī—numeri.
- nułł—(a) nulla ora.
- nũr—numerus.
- nuʳʒ—numerum.
- NΓ—semiuncia.

== O ==
- Ō—non.
- õ—oportet or oportuit.
- Ø—0.
- ôâ—omnia.
- O·A·Q·—omnis ad quos.
- ob'e—obest.
- ob'i—obiecti.
- obl'oʒ—oblationem.
- O·BN·—omnia bona.
- ob'o—obiecto.
- obs—obstat.
- O·C·—ore concilio.
- occl'ta—occulta.
- ocl'i—oculi.
- od'—odoris.
- odǐˡ'—odibilis.
- O·D·M·—operæ donum munus.
- odo'ʒ—odorem.
- O·E·R·—ob eam rem.
- o'es—omnes.
- offō—officio.
- O.F.M.—Ordo Fratrum Minorum.
- OI—10.
- ōim°—omnimodo.
- oł—oleum.
- ol'm—oleum.
- O·MQ—Optimo Maximoque.
- oḿs—omnes.
- ØØ—100.
- oō—omnino.
- O.P. or S.O.P.—Ordo Praedicatorum, Sacri Ordinis Praedicatorum.
- opil'o—opilatio.
- opʒ—oportet.
- oʳ or o~—obiicitur or ostenditur.
- orð.—ordinatur.
- ordi°—ordinatio.
- orⁿ°—organo.
- ós or oˢ—omnes.
- O.S.B.—Ordo sancti Benedicti.
- Ot.—Otto (Papiensis).
- O·U·—Optimus Vir or Optimo Viro.
- o·u·d—omni virtuti deditus.
- oʒtuit—oportuit.

== P ==
- p—pupilla.
- p'—post.
- P·A—Perpetuus Augustus.
- pāc—Paciliano.
- paˡ'—passibilis.
- pałł. or pałłio or pałło—pallatio.
- pal.sco—palatinus scholaris.
- Pałt—Palatinus.
- pa°—passio.
- Pas.—Pascipoverus.
- pat°no—patrocinio.
- pbʒ—probus.
- p·c·—patres conscripti.
- pc—post consulatum.
- pč—Principatus.
- P·D·E·—Possessio data est.
- pẽa—pœna.
- pēn—pensione.
- pês—penes.
- Pħ—Philippus.
- pħa—philosophia.
- pħe—philosophiæ.
- ph's—Philippus or philosophus.
- piḡ—pignori.
- piss.—piissimo.
- pl—placuit.
- pl'a—plura.
- płac—placuerit.
- pl'es—plures.
- pl'ibʒ—pluribus.
- pl'ie—plurimæ.
- pl'im—plurimum.
- pl'mo or pl'o—pulmo.
- pl'mʒ or pl'mqʒ—plerumque.
- pl'ra or płra—plaustra or plura.
- plt—placitum.
- pl'timi—penultimi.
- pl'ủi—pulveri.
- plʒ—placet.
- ṕ.m—propria manu.
- pnãm—pœnitentiam.
- pnīe—pœnitentiæ.
- pōitīe—positive.
- põr—portinarii.
- por°—portio.
- p.os.b.—(post) pedum oscula beatorum.
- postr.—postridie.
- post~—possunt.
- pot; or pot'—potest.
- pōt—potestas or potuit.
- pp—perpetuus or perpetuum.
- PP.—Papa, Patres, Piissimus.
- ṕṕ—pater patriae.
- ppaug—Perpetuus Augustus.
- ṕṕd—praesens praesentibus dixi.
- ppl—perpetualis.
- ppl'o—populo.
- ppł'ris—popularis.
- P·P·N·—pater patriæ nominatus.
- pr—praetor.
- PR—Popolus Romanus.
- ṕr—presbyter.
- pr̄iarcha–patriarcha Patriarch (Begriffsklärung)
- pʳa—pura.
- prm.—primicerius.
- pʳo—puro.
- P·S·—Provincia Siciliæ.
- PS. or Pˢ or P's.—Psalmus.
- p's—presbyteri.
- pū—pura or puta.
- psbó—presbytero.
- Py. or Pí.—Pillius.

== Q ==
- q—qui or 5.
- ·q·—quasi.
- q,—...que.
- q: or Q:—...que or qui.
- q:.—quæ.
- Q.—Quintus.
- Q'.—quod.
- q:d—quid.
- q; or Q;—quæ, quæque, ...que, qui, quia, quibus.
- q·—...que.
- qʒ—...que.
- q·a·—qui appellatur.
- qaghd—quo agitur habendas.
- QĀM—quemadmodum.
- .qʃbs—quibus.
- q,cc—quia
- Q·d·—quasi dicat or quasi diceret.
- qʃd—quid.
- qð or qd'—quod.
- qđa—quondam.
- qđē—quod est.
- q'esc'e—quiescere.
- QI—qui.
- Ql—Quinquenalis.
- qiđ or qið—quid or quidem.
- qˡ'—qualis.
- q·m·—quominus.
- Q·M·P·—qui me presente.
- qń—qui nominatur.
- qⁿ—quando.
- Q·N·P·—Quæ nobis præsentibus.
- q'nʒ—quandoque.
- q°—quo.
- q°mg—quo magis.
- q°°—quomodo.
- q°q°—quoquo.
- q°s—quos.
- q°t·—quo tempore.
- q°tlʒ—quotlibet.
- q·p·—qui ponitur.
- qq—quoque.
- qq.ss.—qui supra.
- q.q.t.t.—qua quemque tangit.
- qʳ—quæritur or quartarii.
- qs or q.s.—quasi, qui supra.
- q:′so—quæso.
- QTQ·—quotienscumque.
- qũ—quamvis.
- qualʒ—qualibet.
- quēlʒ—quemlibet.
- qu'e't—quæreret.
- quł—qualiter.
- QŪM—quoniam.
- qúo—quoniam.
- qūo—quoniam.
- quoŕ—quorum.
- quoʒ—quoque.
- Qz—quia.

== R ==
- r'ā—regula.
- ra°—ratio.
- ratā—ratam.
- raū.—Ravennatis.
- R·C·—Romana civitas or Romani cives.
- reddʳ—redditur.
- Redd~—Redditus.
- rel.—relictus, relicta, ecc.
- rel.q.—relicta quondam.
- remoʒ—removet.
- repło—repletio.
- repʳ—reperitur.
- reʳ—requiritur.
- ret'i—recenti.
- ret'no—retentio.
- ret°—retroacto.
- retʒ—retinet.
- R.F.—Rex Francorum.
- RG·—Rogatarius.
- rł—reliqua.
- rl'a—regula.
- rl'aʒ—regulam.
- rl'ibʒ—regularibus.
- rl'm or rłm—regularium or relativum.
- rl'ois—relationis.
- R·N·—Rerum Novarum.
- Rńs—Renuntians.
- Ro.—rogatus or Romanos (Epistola ad).
- r°—ratio, recto, regio, responsio.
- Ro: cu:—Romana curia.
- r'oē—ratione.
- r°ˡ'—rationalis.
- RP—Respublica.
- R.P.D.—Reverendissimus Pater Dominus or Reverendissimo Patre Domino.
- ·R·P·M—Reipublicæ Mediolanensis.
- RR.—Reverendissimi.
- ru—rubram.

== S ==
- S.—Salutem or sanctus.
- s;—sed.
- ś—sicut.
- Sac.—Sacerdos or Sacerdote.
- Sac°—Sacramento.
- sa'gi's or saḡs—sanguinis.
- sa'i—sani.
- S.A.I.—Sua Altezza Imperiale.
- Sał·—Salmo.
- sal°ʳ—salvator.
- Satʳ9—Saturnus.
- sb'al'—substantialis.
- sb'am—substantiam.
- sbb'o—sabbato.
- sb'm—subiectum or substantivum.
- SĈA—Sancta.
- scīfic°—sanctificatio.
- scił or scilʒ—scilicet.
- scirʒ—sciret.
- scỉs or scīs—sanctis.
- SC·L·—sacræ largitiones.
- scł—scilicet.
- scła—sæcula.
- scłarj—sæculari.
- scłm—sæculum.
- scło—sæculo.
- S.C.M.—Sacra Cæsarea Majestas.
- scrín—scriniarius.
- SĈS or Sćs—Sanctus.
- SCÚS—Sanctus.
- SCV'—scutiferi.
- scʒ—scilicet.
- S·D·—sententiam dixit or sub die.
- seð—sedis or sedit.
- sel'—semel.
- senˡ'—sensibilis.
- sepˡ'—septentrionalis.
- seq~.—sequitur.
- sest.—sestarii.
- se9—secum.
- S&—Sed.
- S·F·—sacris faciundis or satisfecit.
- SFF·—sufficit.
- sg°ne—significatione.
- SI'—Sigillum.
- siḡ—signum.
- sigłłm—sigillum.
- siḡo—significatio.
- sił—siliginis or simul.
- siłia—similia.
- sil'i°—simili modo.
- sill's or sill'ʒ—sillogismus.
- siˡ°—simbolo.
- sim'l—simul.
- simʳ or sīpʳ—simpliciter.
- sipˣ—simplex.
- sł—similiter.
- słds—solidis.
- słr—similiter.
- słt—salutem or scilicet.
- $ math'—Secundum Matheum.
- S.M.E.—Sancta Mater Ecclesia.
- smłtr—similiter.
- S.M.M.—Sancta Mater Maria.
- sṅ or sn'—sine.
- Sō—Solutio.
- sol'—solidi or solum.
- sol'oi—solutioni.
- sol'om—solutionem.
- solʳ—solvitur.
- solˢ—solutus.
- sołt—soluta.
- sol&—solidos.
- so°—solo or solutio.
- soph.—Sophoniæ.
- sp'a—sphæra.
- spālja—spiritualia.
- S.PE.—Sanctus Petrus.
- spēm—speciem.
- spiʳ—simpliciter.
- spḿ—spiritum.
- spʳ—simpliciter or super.
- spū·ss·—spiritu sancto.
- sp'uū—spirituum.
- spˣ—simplex.
- sŕ—a sero.
- sʳ—sequitur, similiter, super.
- S.R.I.—Sacrum Romanum Imperium or Sanctum Romanum Imperium.
- SS. or ss— sancti or sanctissimus, simul sumpti, subscripsi, substantia, suprascripti, suprascriptus.
- sˢ—sanctus or syllogismus.
- ssaʳ—specialiter.
- ssē—specie.
- sseaʳ—specialiter.
- S.S.S.—supra scripti sunt.
- ssˢ—species.
- S·T·—sine testibus.
- STD·—satis dat.
- STEP'—Stephanus.
- stî—suprascripti.
- stipl'o—stipulatio.
- stipˢ—stipulans.
- st'o—statio.
- ST·TP—statuta tempora.
- sú—sive.
- sũũ—summum.
- S.V.—Sanctitas Vestra, Sancta Virgo.
- sˣ—simplex.
- sylł—syllabam.
- S7—Sed.
- S9—Sed.

== T ==
- T—oboli tres, superstes, tibi, 2.
- T.—templum, testatur, testis, tomus, titulus.
- ṫ—talis, ter, tum.
- t°—tertio.
- ta.—tabula.
- tal'—talis.
- tēbātʳ—tenebantur.
- tem.—temptationis.
- tēmʳ—tenemur.
- tēntʳ—tenentur.
- ten&—tenet.
- TĒP'—Tempore.
- teʳ—tenetur.
- test'.—testibus.
- tētʳ—tenetur.
- thimo.—Thimotheum (Epistola ad).
- tỉato—terminato.
- Tím.—Timoteum (epistola Pauli ad).
- Tít.—Titum (epistola ad).
- tł—talis.
- tⁿ—tamen.
- t.°—tergo.
- toⁿˢ—totiens.
- to°—toto.
- totʳ—totaliter.
- tpc—tempus.
- t·p·d·—tenere posidere donare.
- tʳ—taliter or tripliciter.
- tŕe—terræ.
- ts—testis.
- tˢ—tempus.
- TT.—Testamentum.

== U ==
- U—Ugo (Hugo).
- ū—unde, ut, vel.
- ūbū—verbum.
- uC—vir Clarus.
- U.C.—Urbis Conditæ.
- úć—vir clarissimus or vir consularis.
- úćdef—vir clarissimus defensor.
- úćrog—vir clarissimus rogatarius.
- u.d.—vir devotissimus, vir devotus, vir discretus.
- ŨDC—5600.
- u.d.pál.sćl—vir devotus palatina schola.
- u·d·p·r·l·p·—ut de plano recte legi posset.
- uelð—velud.
- U.F.—Felicissimus, Fratres, Pandectae (prob. for Gr. II).
- UF—usufructis or vir fortis.
- Ug.—Ugo or Hugo.
- Ū·Ḡ·—verbi gratia.
- ú.ģl.él.ó—vir gloriosus electissimus optimus.
- uħ—vir honorabilis, vir honestus.
- u·ħ·fὁr—vir honestus forensis.
- uidd'—videndum.
- uiđł—videlicet.
- uiłłi—villani.
- ú·ínl·—vir inluster.
- uǐs—vestris.
- u.ł.—vir laudabilis.
- ủllo°—nullo modo.
- ułr—universaliter.
- ú·m·—vir magnificus.
- uoł:—voluntate.
- uołit—voluerit.
- u.p.—vir perfectissimus.
- ur˘—videtur.
- uŕi—vestri.
- u·s·—venerabilis sacerdos, vir sacerdos, vir spectabilis, vir strenuus.
- us—usu, -usis.
- us;—usque.
- usaq—usus aquarum.
- usʒ°—usquequo.
- ủtor—vertor.
- ûû—venerabilis, vir venerabilis.
- ūū—verum.
- uuadiḿ—wadimonium.

== V ==
- V.—Venerabilis, Venerandus, 5.
- VĀL—Vale.
- V.deCa—Willelmus de Calviano.
- vđł—videlicet.
- V.D.M—Verbi Dei Minister.
- ve'isiłe—verisimile.
- veł—velis.
- Vełłeg.—Vellegiani.
- Veñ—Veneris.
- V.G.—Verbi gratia.
- VI—Vestri Imperii.
- v'i—viri.
- vidñr—videntur.
- vi°ne—visione.
- VIX—sextodecimo or 16.
- VIˣˣ—120.
- VI+—6,5.
- vˡʲ—universali.
- vl'ia—universalia.
- vlłʒ—vellet.
- vⁿ—unde.
- vnis—universis.
- v°—quinto, uno, vero, verso.
- voltis—voluntatis.
- vŕ—urina.
- vʳ—videtur.
- V.R.P.—Vestra Reverendissima Paternitas.
- vsqʒ—usque.
- VVVDDD—Viri Devoti (tres).
- VX—quintodecimo or 15.
- vʒ—valet or videlicet.
- v9—unus or versus.

== W ==
- W.deCa.—Wilelmus de Cabriano.
- Włło—Willelmo.
- Wiłłṡ—Willelmus.

== X ==
- X—10.
- Xís—undecim semis (11,5).
- xłsimo—quadragesimo.
- Xpī—Christi.
- xpo—Christo.
- Xt°—Christo.

== Y ==
- Ẏ,—Antigraphus.
- y:—qui or ...que.
- ỷdēps—ydemptitas.
- Y'e—Yesaiæ
- ·ýħs—Yesus.
- ymb'—ymber.
- ym°—ymago.
- ȳpni—ympni.
- ·ypo·—Ypocrates.
- Yr.—Yrnerius.
- Ẏsa—Ysaias.

== Z ==
- z—et or 2.
- ·z·—etiam.
- Z—Obolus dimidius.
- Zāb'—Zambarella.
- Ze—Zestarius (Sextarius).
- Zo—acetabulum.

== Conventional signs ==
- ₳—Asteriscus.
- ɔ—Antisigma.
- ð—Asteriscus.
- ʉ—enim.
- *–—Asteriscus cum obelo.
- &—et.
- &ccłæ—ecclesiæ.
- &đ.—et dimidia.
- ÷—dimidium, est, id est, hoc est, Limniscus.
- > or ·>·—2.
- >>—22.
- >Λ—27.
- ·>Ø·—20.
- ɤ—esse.
- Λ—et or 7.
- Λ°nał—septentrionalis.
- Π—12.
- ω—mulier or secundum naturam.
- ɵ—obiit or obitus.
- ·ẽ·—Sanctus.
- –—obolus.
- =—oboli duo.
- =m9—essemus.
- ≈—esse.
- ≈s—esses.
- 2—et.
- 2°°—secundo modo.
- 2ʳ—dupliciter.
- ʒ—3 or est.
- ʒ°°—tertio modo.
- 6ił—siliginis or simul.
- 6iˣ—simplex.
- 6ʳd9—surdus.
- 7—et or 2.
- 7,—et cætera.
- 7enĩ—etenim.
- 7rł—et reliqua.
- ·8·—8.
- 9—compilatio, con..., cum..., 9.
- 9.—completorium or consecratione.
- 9ce°—concedo.
- 9cił—concilium.
- 9cło—conclusio.
- 9cluʳ—concluditur.
- 9dam—cuiusdam.
- 9d'oʒ—conditionem.
- 9f—confirmat.
- 9fẻns—conferens.
- 9fr—confrater.
- 9fʳ—confertur or confirmatur.
- 9g°—cognitio.
- 9gʳ—cognoscitur.
- 9îs—communis.
- 9mo°—commodo.
- 9°—conclusio or coniunctio.
- ·9°·—complexio.
- 9°m—conclusionem.
- 9°ne—conclusione or constructione.
- 9°ʳ—commentator.
- 9pełłr—compellitur.
- 9pl'—completorium.
- 9pl'e—complere.
- 9pl'o—complexio.
- 9pˣo or 9pˣio—complexo.
- 9pˣū—complexum.
- 9ʳ—communiter, componitur, conceditur.
- 9ˢ—consequens.
- 9siʳ—consideratur.
- 9ss—consulibus.
- 9st'o—constitutio.
- 9stʒ—constet.
- 9t~—continetur.
- 9tʒ or 9tiʒ—continet.
- 9ˣo or 9ˣ°—complexo.

== Sources ==
- Cappelli, Adriano (1929) [1899]. Lexicon abbreviaturarum: dizionario di abbreviature latine ed italiane usate nelle carte e nei codici, specialmente del Medio-Evo, riprodotte con oltre 14000 segni incisi; con l'aggiunta di uno studio sulla brachigrafia medioevale, un prontuario di sigle epigrafiche, l'antica numerazione romana ed arabica ed i segni indicanti monete, pesi, misure, etc (3rd ed.). Milano: Ulrico Hoepli.
- Cappelli, Adriano (2011) [1899]. Geymonat, Mario; Troncarelli, Fabio (eds.). Lexicon Abbreviaturarum: dizionario di abbreviature Latine ed Italiane usate nelle carte e codici specialmente del Medio-Evo (7th ed.). Milan: Ulrico Hoepli. ISBN 9788820345464.
