= Guillaume Durand =

French canonist and bishop

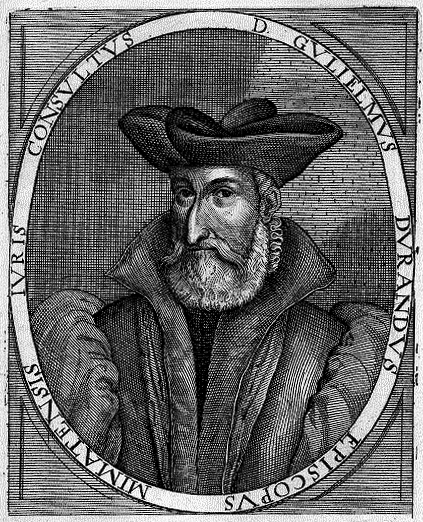
17th-century depiction of Durand

Guillaume Durand, or William Durand (c. 1230 – 1 November 1296), also known as Durandus, Duranti or Durantis, from the Italian form of Durandi filius, as he sometimes signed himself, was a French canonist and liturgical writer, and Bishop of Mende.

Coat of arms

== Life ==
Durand was born at Puimisson, near Béziers, of a noble family of Languedoc. He studied law at Bologna, with Bernard of Botone, and by about 1264 was teaching canon law with success at Modena. Pope Clement IV, another Frenchman, called him to the pontifical court as a chaplain and auditor of the palace, and in 1274 he accompanied Clement's successor, Pope Gregory X, to the Second Council of Lyons, the constitutions of which he helped draw up. As spiritual and temporal legate of the patrimony of St. Peter, he received in 1278, in the pope's name, the homage of Bologna and the other cities of Romagna. Pope Martin IV made him vicar spiritual in 1281, then governor of Romagna and of the March of Ancona (1283). In the midst of the struggles between Guelphs and Ghibellines, Durand successfully defended the papal territories, both by diplomacy and by arms. Pope Honorius IV retained him in his offices, and although elected bishop of Mende in 1286, he remained in Italy until 1291. In 1293 he created a rite for all those who were taking up the cross to participate in the crusades, “to go in aid of the Holy Land”. In September 1294 he was present at Orleans at the Provincial Council presided over by Simon, Bishop of Bourges. In 1295 he refused the archbishopric of Ravenna, offered him by Pope Boniface VIII, but accepted the task of pacifying his former provinces of Romagna and the March of Ancona. In 1296 he withdrew to Rome, where he died. His tomb is in the church of Santa Maria sopra Minerva.

Durand's nephew, also called Guillaume Durand, was also a canonist. Guillaume Durand the Younger, a later bishop of Mende, was an advocate of ecclesiastical reform at the Council of Vienne.

== Important works ==
Durand's principal work is the Speculum iudiciale, which was compiled in 1271, and revised in 1286 and 1291. It is a general explanation of civil, criminal, and canonical procedure, and also includes a survey of the subject of contracts. It is a remarkable encyclopaedic synthesis of Roman and ecclesiastical law, distinguished by its clarity, its method, and especially its practical sense, and it was long highly regarded in the courts as in the schools. It won Durand the nickname of Doctor Speculator, an obvious pun on the title of his work. It was commented upon by Giovanni d'Andrea (in 1346), and by Baldus. In 1306 Cardinal Béranger drew up an alphabetic table of its contents (Inventorium). There are many manuscripts of the Speculum, and several printed editions, of which the most usual is that of Turin in 1578 in 2 volumes, containing all additions – among them those by Giovanni d'Andrea – and tables. This edition was reproduced at Frankfurt in 1612 and 1668.

Another important work by Durand was the Rationale divinorum officiorum, a liturgical treatise written in Italy before 1286, on the origin and symbolic sense of Christian ritual. It presents a picture of the liturgy of the 13th century in the West, studied in its various forms, its traditional sources, and its relation to the church buildings and furniture. It long served as a major authority on medieval Latin liturgy and ran through various editions from its first printing in 1459. The other important works of Durand comprise:

- Repertorium iuris canonici (Breviarium aureum), a collection of citations from canonists on questions of controversy, often published along with the Speculum
- Commentarius in sacrosanctum Lugdunense concilium (ed. Fano, 1569), of especial value owing to Durand's part in drawing up the council's constitutions, and inserted by Pope Boniface VIII in the Sextus.

== Bibliography ==
On the elder Durand, see:

- Joseph-Victor Leclerc in Histoire littéraire de la France, vol. xx. pp. 411–497 (1842)
- Johann Friedrich von Schulte, Geschichte der Quellen des canonischen Rechts (1877)
- Émile Mâle, L'Art religieux en XIIIe siècle en France (1898).

On the nephew, see:

- Barthélemy Hauréau, in Journal des savants (1892), 64.
