= Antonius de Butrio =

Italian jurist

Antonius de Butrio (1338–1408), also called Antonio da Butrio (or simply Don Antonius), was an Italian jurist and a teacher of law at Bologna.

== Biography ==
Antonius de Butrio was venerated in his lifetime both for his qualities as a professor and for the example of his religious and moral virtues. His university career was essentially at Bologna, where he attracted numerous pupils, among them future great representatives of 15th-century canonical science, like Johannes de Imola, Francesco Zabarella or Domenico di San Giminiano.

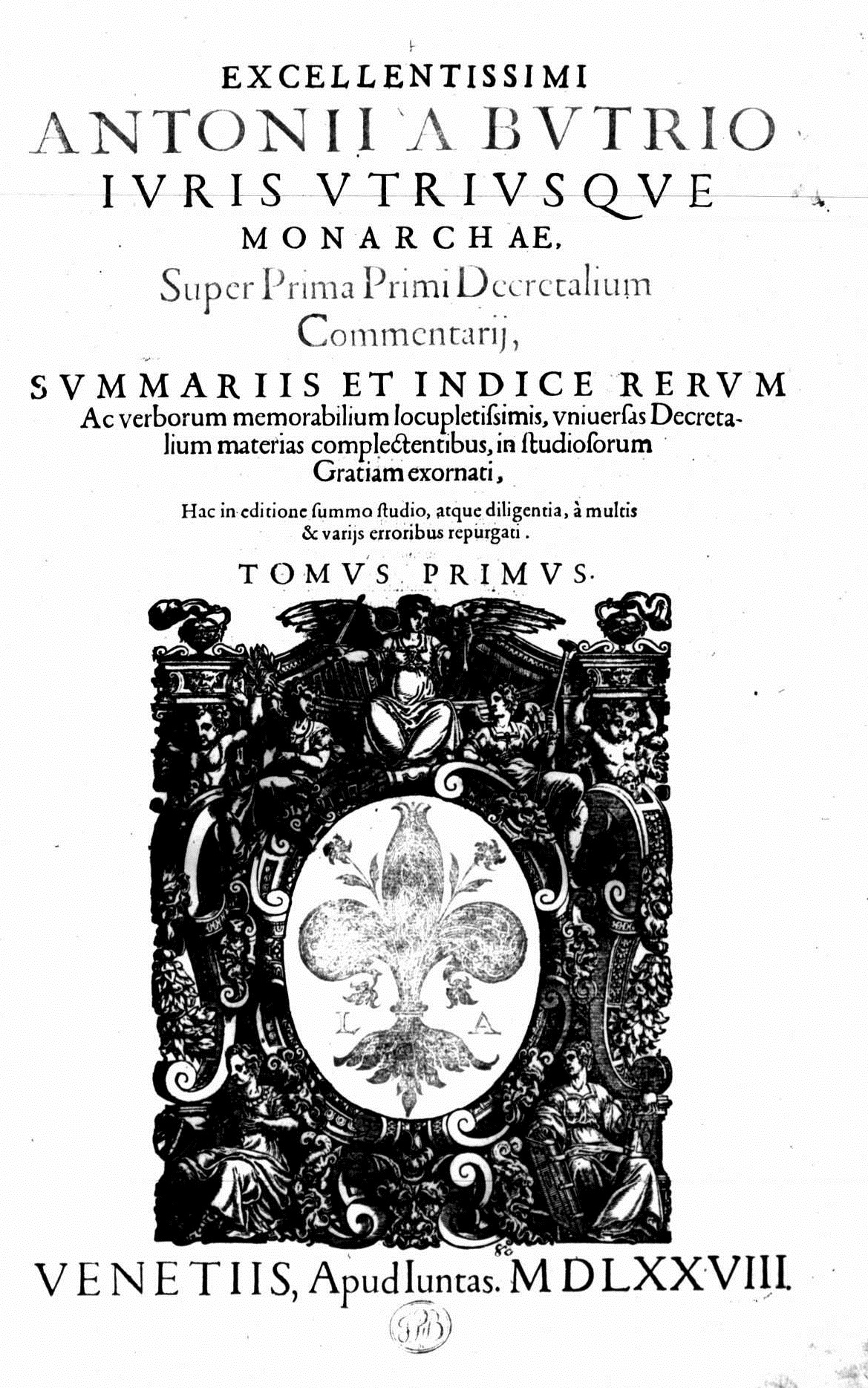
Super Decretales, 1578.

He composed numerous commentaries to the Decretals of Gregory IX and the Liber Sextus, which provide a comprehensive impression of the contemporary practice of canon and civil law. In 1408, he also negotiated on behalf of Gregory XII about the end of the Western Schism.

== Works ==
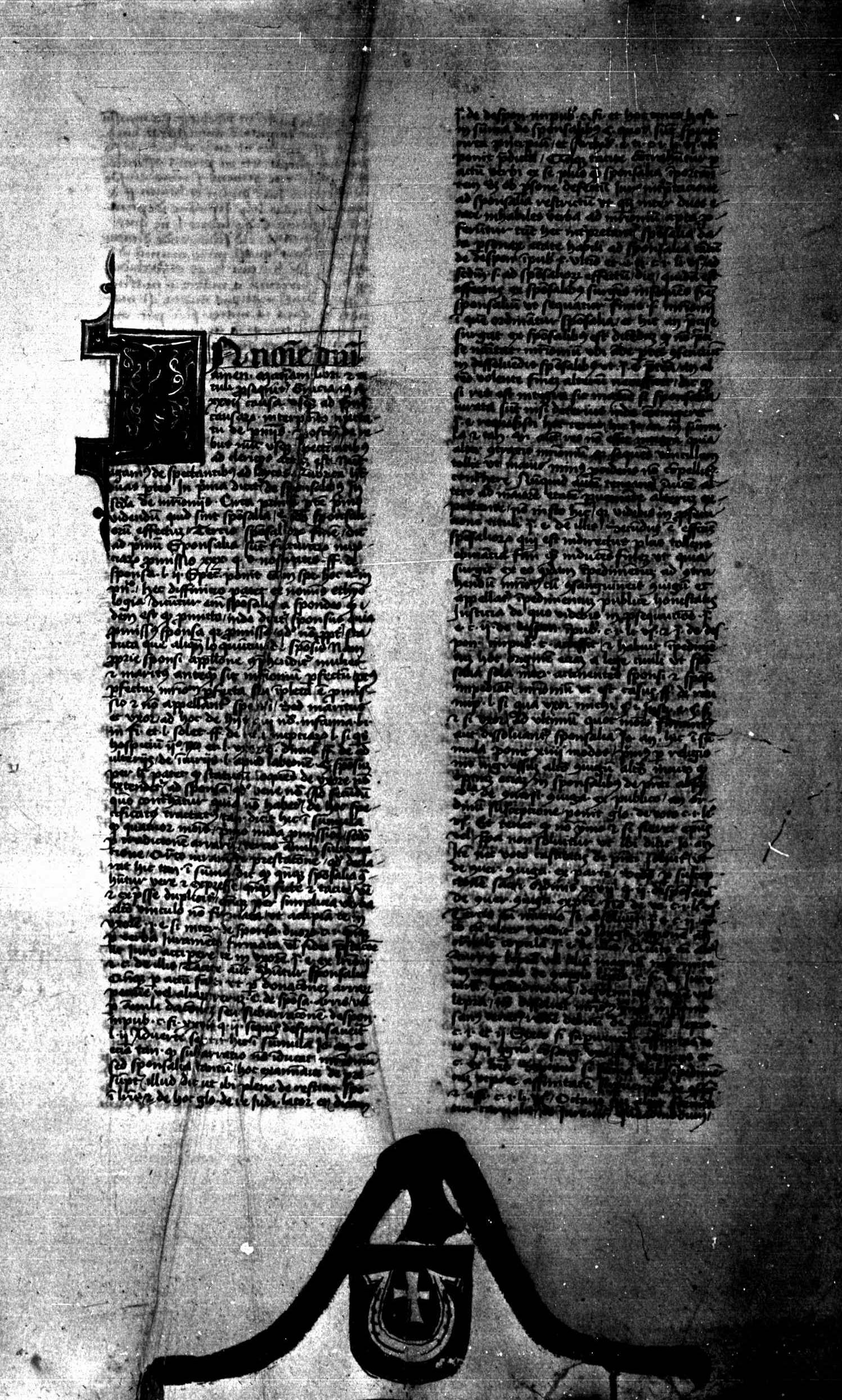
Lectura Decretalium, manuscript, 15th century. Jagiellonian Library, Kraków.

- Consilia (in Latin). Rome: Adam Rot. 1472.
- Consilia seu responsa D. Antonii de Butr. Bonon ... . Nunc denuo à multis erroribus repurgata. Atque pereximijs Gasparis Caballini iurisc. scolijs illustrata. Accessit Hieron. de Tortis pro Repub. F (in Latin). Venice: Cristoforo Zanetti. 1575.
- Super primo Decretalium (in Latin). Rome: Ulrich Han & Simone Cardella. 1473.
- Super quarto Decretalium (in Latin). Johann Reinhard & Paul Leenen. 1474.
- Super Decretales (in Latin). Vol. 1. Venice: Lucantonio Giunta. 1578.
  - Super Decretales (in Latin). Vol. 2. Venice: Lucantonio Giunta. 1578.
  - Super Decretales (in Latin). Vol. 3. Venice: Lucantonio Giunta. 1578.
  - Super Decretales (in Latin). Vol. 4. Venice: Lucantonio Giunta. 1578.
  - Super Decretales (in Latin). Vol. 5. Venice: Lucantonio Giunta. 1578.
  - Super Decretales (in Latin). Vol. 6. Venice: Lucantonio Giunta. 1578.
  - Super Decretales (in Latin). Vol. 7. Venice: Lucantonio Giunta. 1578.
  - Super Decretales (in Latin). Vol. 8. Venice: Lucantonio Giunta. 1578.
