= Johannes de Imola =

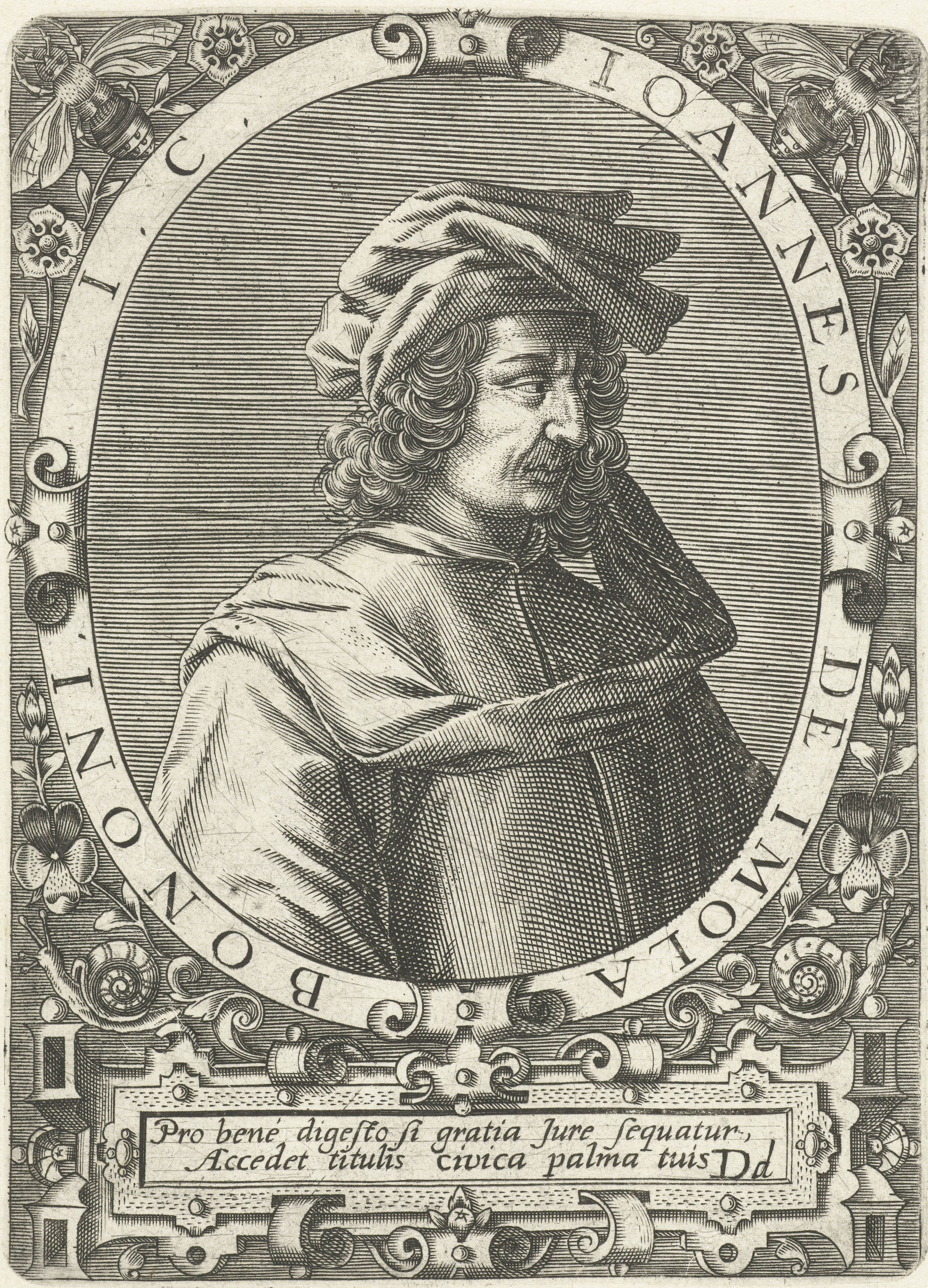
Johannes de Imola, engraving by Theodor de Bry.

Johannes de Imola (Italian: Giovanni Nicolétti, English: John of Imola) (c. 1370 – 1436) was an Italian jurist, a student of Baldus de Ubaldis, Francesco Ramponi and Johannes of Lignano. He taught at Pavia, Siena and Bologna, and was one of the major commentators on the Decretals of Gregory IX

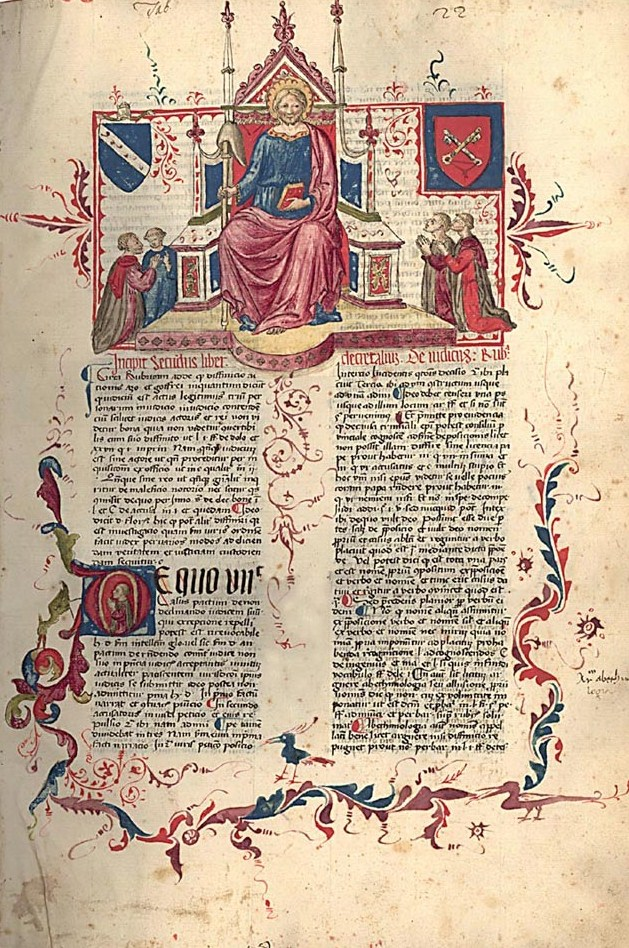
Page from commentary on Book II of the Decretals by Johannes de Imola, contemporary with the end of his life.

In the Western Schism, he supported the form of conciliarism that deemed the correct resolution of the schism would be for Pope Gregory XII to summon a general council.

He was a strong defender of due process.

== Biography ==
He was a student of Baldus de Ubaldis, Francesco Ramponi and John of Legnano. He taught in Pavia, Siena and Bologna, and was one of the major commentators on the Decretals of Gregory IX.

In the Western Schism, he supported the form of conciliarism that held that the proper resolution of the schism would be for Pope Gregory XII to convene an ecumenical council.

He died in 1436 and was buried in the San Domenico, Bologna in Bologna, in the ark of the Garisendi family, to whom he was related.
