= Francesco Zabarella =

Italian cardinal and canonist

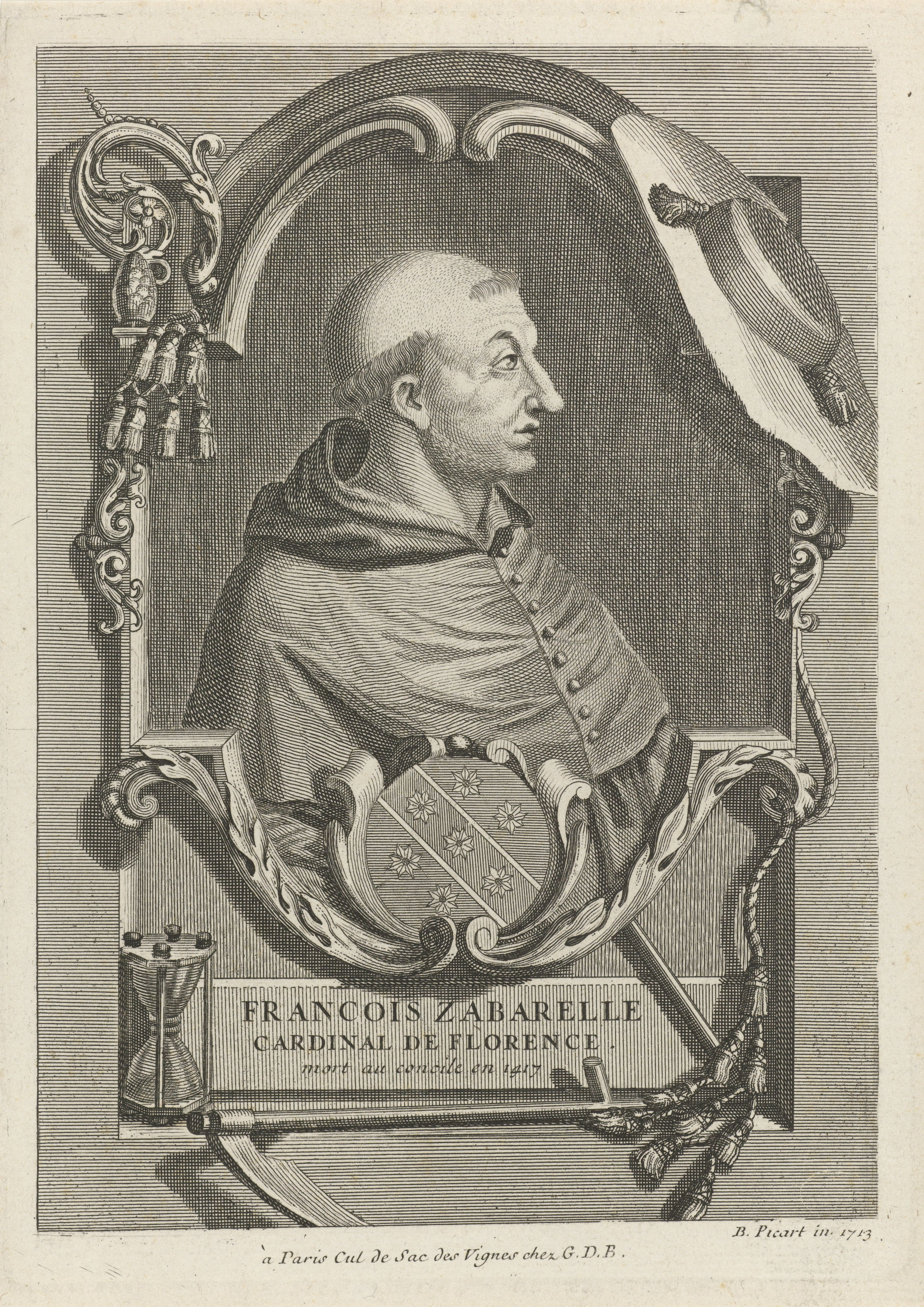
Portrait of Francesco Zabarella

Francesco Zabarella (10 August 1360 – 26 September 1417) was an Italian cardinal and canonist.

== Appointment as bishop ==
Born in Padua, he studied jurisprudence at Bologna and at Florence, where he graduated in 1385. He taught Canon law at Florence until 1390 and at Padua until 1410. Having taken minor orders in 1385, he became vicar of bishop Acciajuoli of Florence and pastor at the Church of Santa Maria in Pruncta near Florence.

In 1398, he was made archpriest of the cathedral at Padua. The Paduan Government repeatedly employed him on diplomatic missions, and towards the end of 1404, he was one of two ambassadors sent to King Charles VI of France to obtain the latter's assistance against Venice, which was preparing to annex Padua. When Padua had become part of the Venetian Republic in 1406, Zabarella became a loyal supporter of Venice. In 1409, he took part in the Council of Pisa as councilor of the Venetian legate.

On 18 July 1410, Pope John XXIII appointed him bishop of Florence and papal referendary, and on 6 June 1411, he made him the Cardinal Deacon of the Titular church of Santi Cosma e Damiano .

== Other ventures ==
His most important literary production is an ecclesiastic-political treatise, De schismate (Strasburg, 1515). It consists of independent portions, written at different intervals from 1403 to 1408, and contains various suggestions for ending the schism.

Zabarella's chief writings in canon law are (with examples of editions):

- Lectura super Clementinis (Naples, 1471)
- Commentarius in libros Decretalium (Venice, 1502)
- Consilia (Venice, 1581)

Also attributed to him but in need of verification:

- De felicitate libri III (Padua, 1655)
- De arte metrica
- De natura rerum diversarum
- De corpore Christi

A large number of his letters are in the Österreichische Nationalbibliothek of Vienna, Cod. Lat. 5513. In some, Zabarella is referred to by the title Cardinalis

In music history, Zabarella is noted as the patron of the composer Johannes Ciconia. Ciconia complimented Zabarella in song, by composing a three-voice isorhythmic motet in his honor, Doctorum Principem/Melodia Suavissima/Vir Mitis, surviving in the manuscript Bologna Q15.

== Later career ==
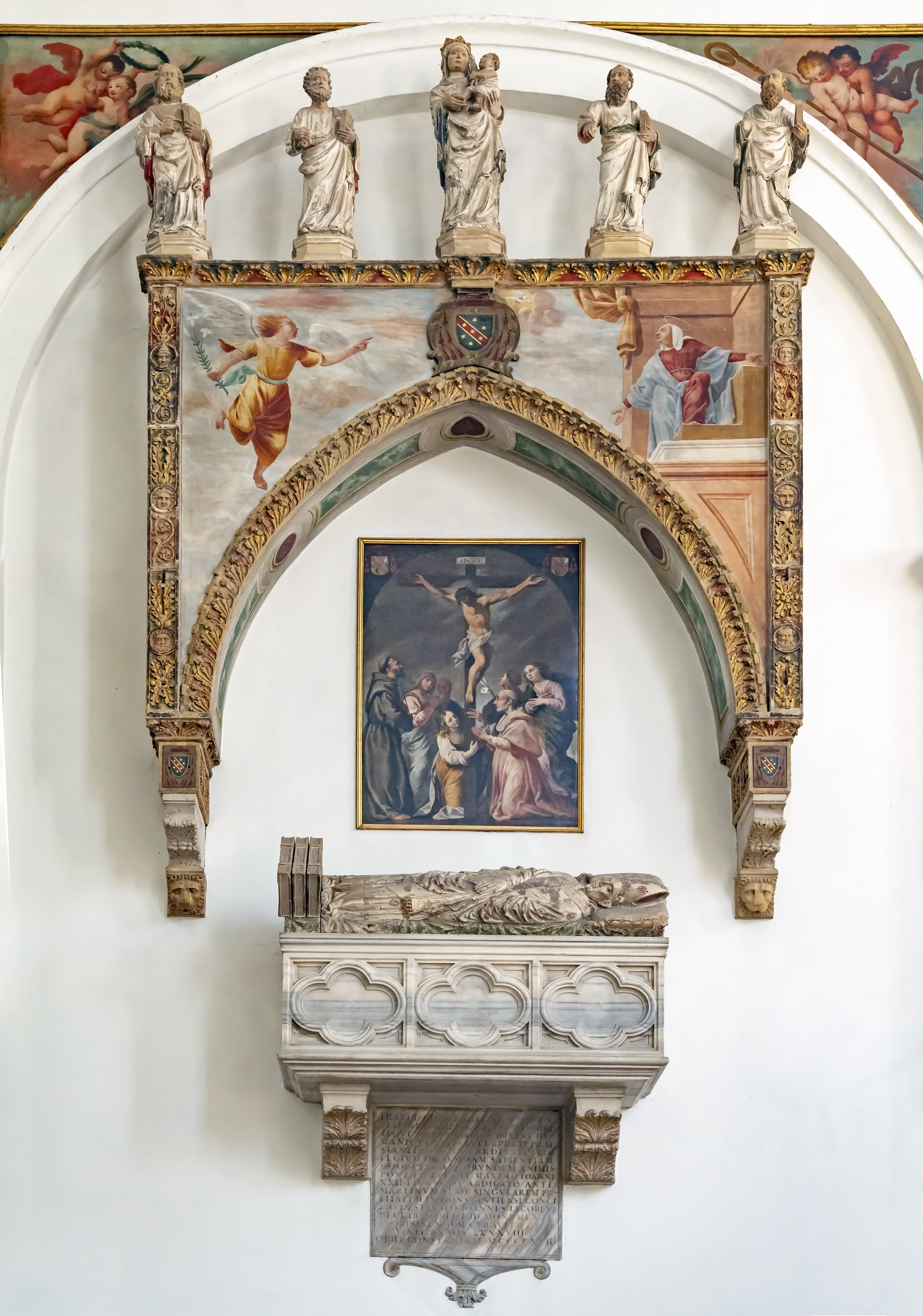
Padua Cathedral - tomb of cardinal Zabarella.

Though he never received major orders, he was one of the most active and influential cardinals of the Antipope John XXIII, whose interests he supported at the Council of Rome (1412–13). When this council failed to end the lamentable schism, John XXIII sent the cardinals Zabarella and De Challant as legates to King Sigismund (son of Holy Roman Emperor Charles IV, and emperor after 1433) at Como in October, 1413, with full powers to come to an understanding with the latter concerning the place and time for holding a new council. It was arranged to open the new council at Constance on 1 November 1414, where Zabarella was one of the chief supporters of John XXIII. When the latter fled from Constance 20 March 1415, in order to thwart the election of a new pope, Zabarella remained as his representative. It was chiefly through his influence that John XXIII finally resigned the papacy unconditionally in April, 1415. Nevertheless, the Council of Constance continued its proceedings against John, and commissioned Zabarella with four other cardinals to inform him of his suspension, and later of his formal deposition by the council. In the proceedings against the Avignonese Pope Benedict XIII, Zabarella proposed, at the session held 28 November 1416, that Benedict be cited before the council. He also took part in the proceedings of the council against Huss, Jerome of Prague, and Jean Petit. His attempts to induce the two former to sign a softened form of retraction proved useless. From April till the end of July he sought to regain health and strength at a neighbouring watering place. On 28 July he was again at Constance, and up to the time of his death exerted all his influence to hasten the election of a new pope. He is buried in the cathedral at Padua.

== Works ==
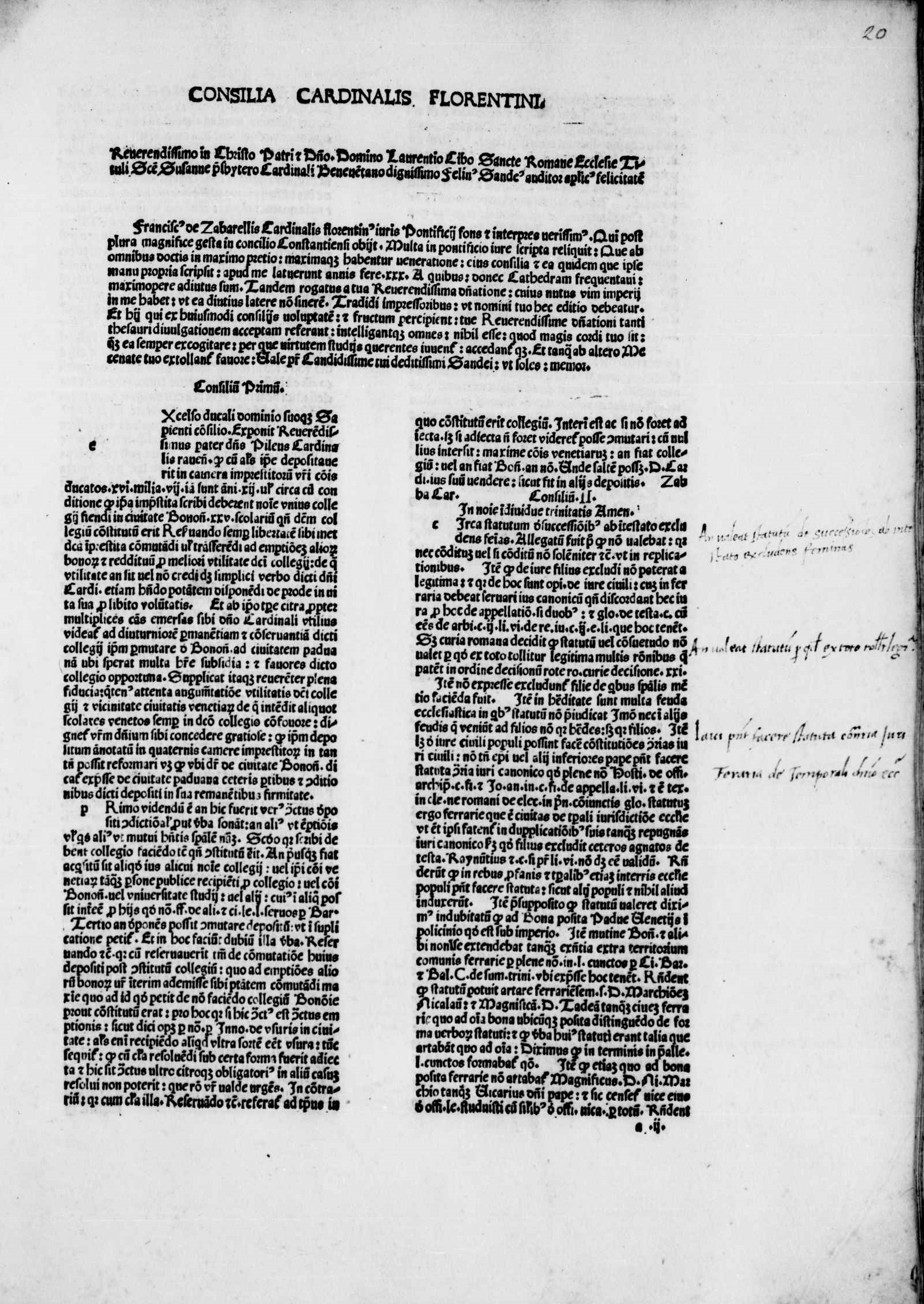
Consilia, 1490 edition

- De schismate, Strasbourg, 1515.
- Lectura super Clementinis, Naples, 1471.
- Commentaria in quinque libros decretalium, Venice, 1502.
  - Commentaria in quinque libros decretalium (in Latin). Vol. 1. Lyon: Claude Servain. 1558.
  - Commentaria in quinque libros decretalium (in Latin). Vol. 2. Lyon: Thomas Bertheau. 1558.
  - Commentaria in quinque libros decretalium (in Latin). Vol. 3. Lyon. 1557.
  - Commentaria in quinque libros decretalium (in Latin). Vol. 4. Lyon. 1558.
  - Commentaria in quinque libros decretalium (in Latin). Vol. 5. Lyon. 1558.
- Consilia juris
  - Consilia (in Latin). Pescia: Tipografo dell'Antonio da Cannara. 1490.
- De felicitate libri III, Padua, 1655.
- De arte metrica
- De natura rerum diversarum
- De corpore Christi
- Commentarium in Clementinas
- Repetitiones

== Sources ==
- Herbermann, Charles, ed. (1913). "Francesco Zabarella" . Catholic Encyclopedia. New York: Robert Appleton Company.
- Thomas E. Morrissey, Conciliarism and Church Law in the Fifteenth Century, Farnham: Variorum, 2014.
- Dieter Girgensohn, Francesco Zabarella aus Padua, Wien: Böhlau, 1993.
