= Giovanni d'Andrea =

Italian medieval legal scholar

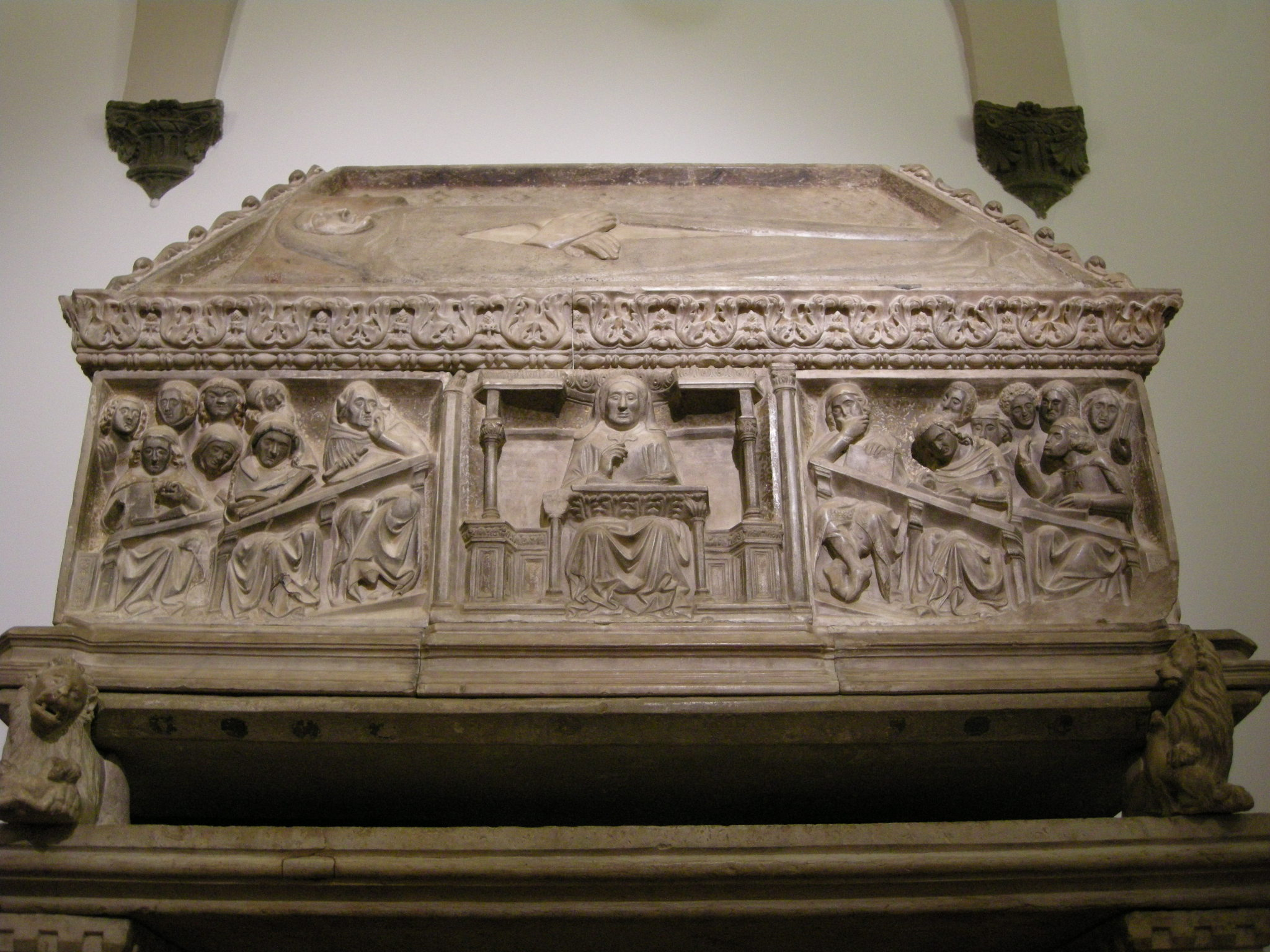
Sepulchre of Giovanni d'Andrea

Giovanni d'Andrea or Johannes Andreæ (1270 × 1275 – 1348) was an Italian expert in canon law. His contemporaries referred to him as iuris canonici fons et tuba ("the fount and trumpet of canon law"). Most important among his works were extensive commentaries on all of the official collections of papal decretals, papal judgments in the form of letters to delegated judges that were at the core of canon law.

== Life ==
Giovanni d'Andrea was born at Rifredo, near Florence, and studied Roman law and canon law at the University of Bologna, the great law school of the age, where he distinguished himself in this subject so much that he was made professor at Padua, and then at Pisa before returning to Bologna, where he remained from the season of 1301–02 until his death, save for brief seasons at Padua 1307–09 and 1319. He wrote the statutes by which the university was governed, in 1317.

The 1911 Encyclopædia Britannica related curious stories of him: that by way of self-mortification he lay every night for twenty years on the bare ground with only a bear's skin for a covering (yet it is known that he remained a layman, was married and had children); that in an audience he had with Pope Boniface VIII his extraordinary shortness of stature led the pope to believe he was kneeling, and to ask him three times to rise, to the immense merriment of the cardinals; and that he had a daughter, Novella, so accomplished in law as to be able to read her father's lectures in his absence, and so beautiful that she had to read behind a curtain lest her face should distract the attention of the students. He was also the father of Bettina d'Andrea.

He is reported to have died at Bologna of the Black Death in 1348, and an epitaph in the church of the Dominicans in which he was buried (calling him Rabbi Doctorum, Lux, Censor, Normaque Morum) testifies to the public estimation of his character. Johannes Calderinus (1300–1365) was his student and later his adoptive son. Paulus de Liazariis and Johannes de Sancto Georgio were among his students, and he counted the humanists Cino da Pistoia and Petrarch among his friends.

== Works ==
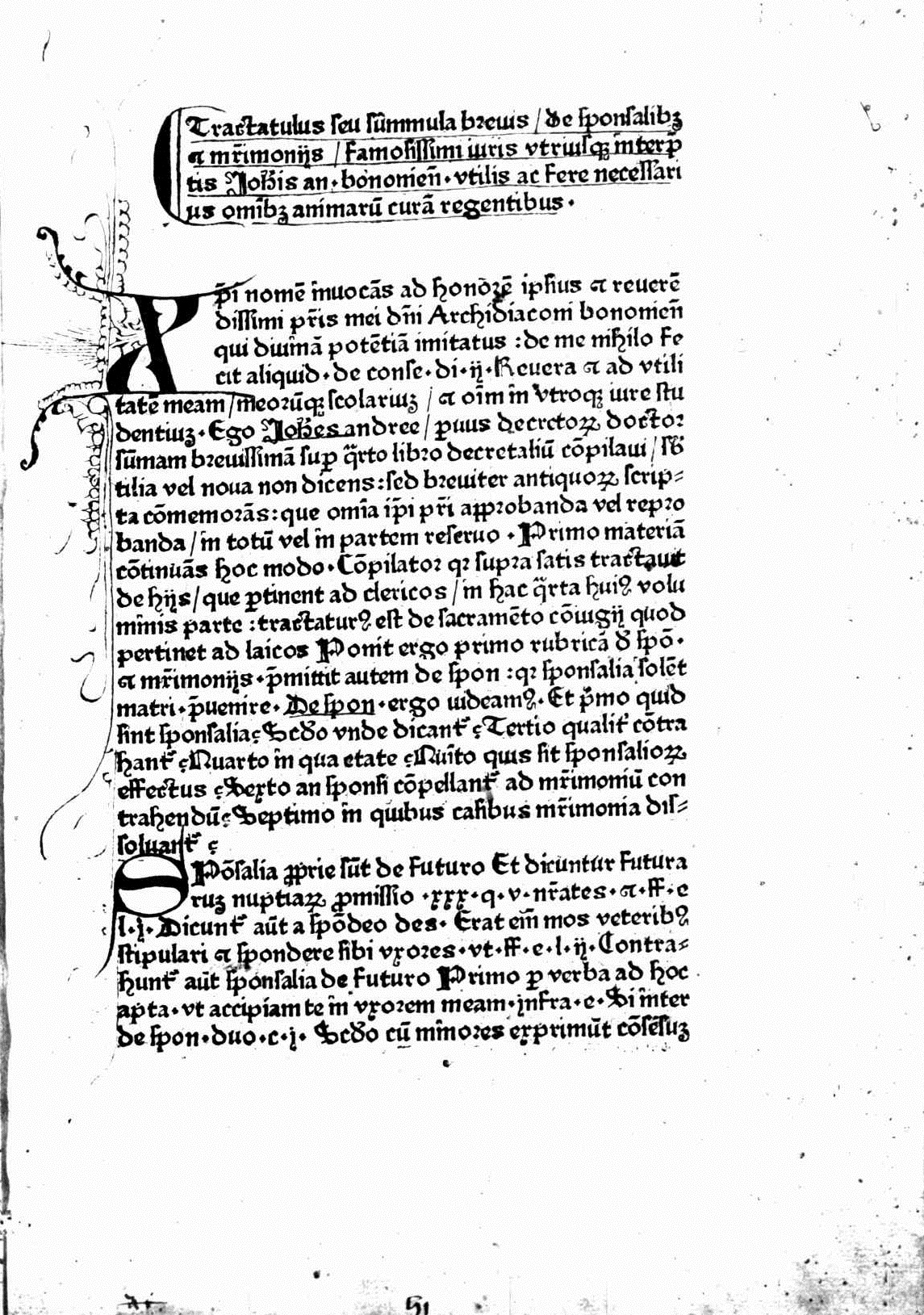
Summa de sponsalibus et matrimoniis, 1472-1474

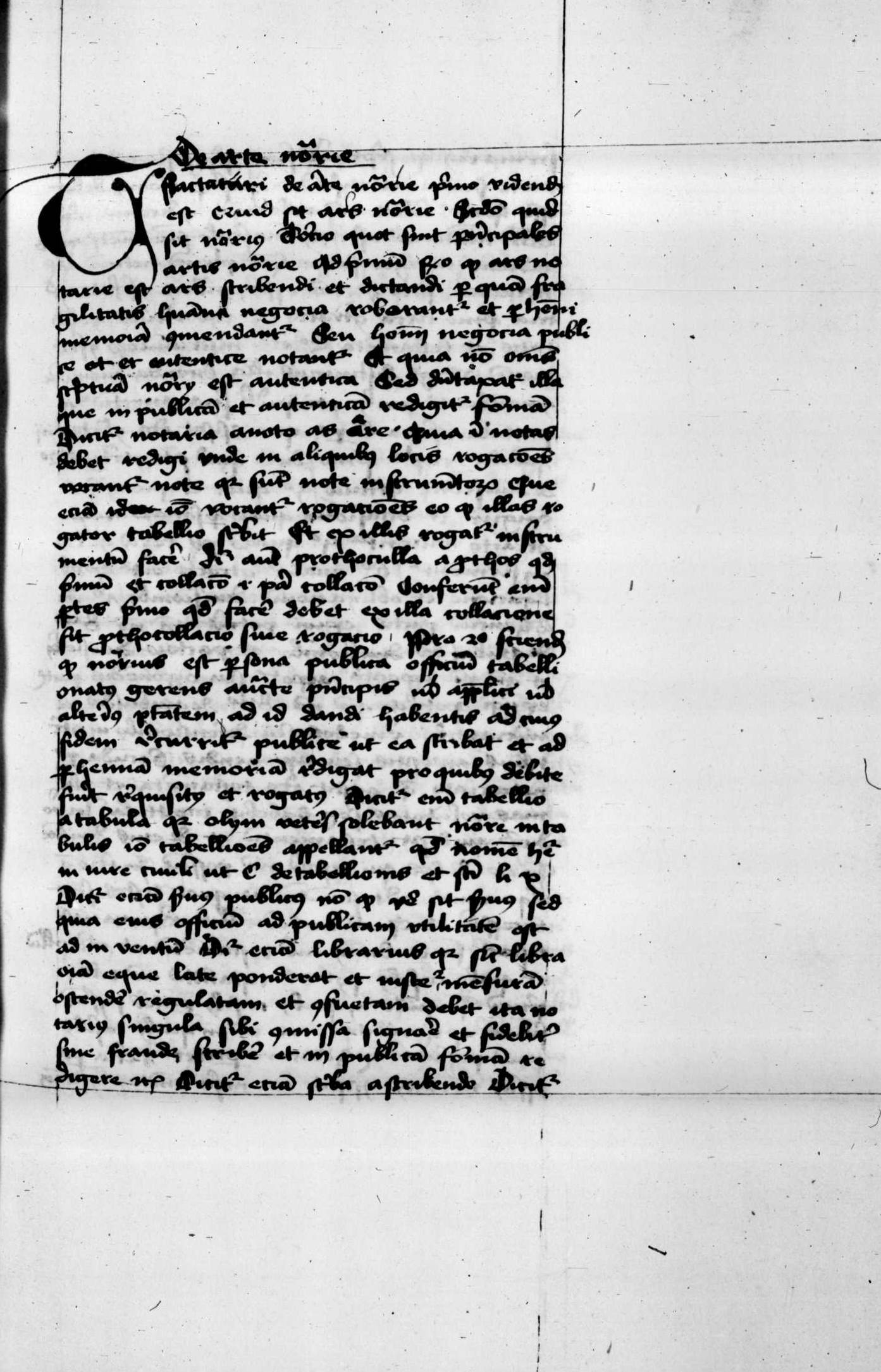
Tractatus de Iohannis Andreae lectura arboris consanguinitatis et affinitatis, manuscript, 15th century

Giovanni d'Andrea's output was voluminous:

- a gloss called (Novella sive commentarius in decretales epistolas Gregorii IX) on the Liber Extra (1234), compiled under the direction of Pope Gregory IX (see Decretals)
- an encomium of Saint Jerome, the Hierominianum
- glosses on the Constitutiones Clementinae or Clementines of 1317 which became the standard gloss (the Glossa ordinaria) for this text
- a commentary called the Mercuriales on the Regula iuris in the Liber Sextus (1298) of Boniface VIII.

Among lesser works, his additions to the Speculum of Durandus are simply an adaptation from the Consilia of Oldradus de Ponte, as is also his De Sponsalibus et Matrimonio, from Johannes Anguisciola.

- Summa de sponsalibus et matrimoniis (in Latin). Basel: Martin Flach. 1472–1474.
