= Judiciary =

System of courts that interprets and applies the law

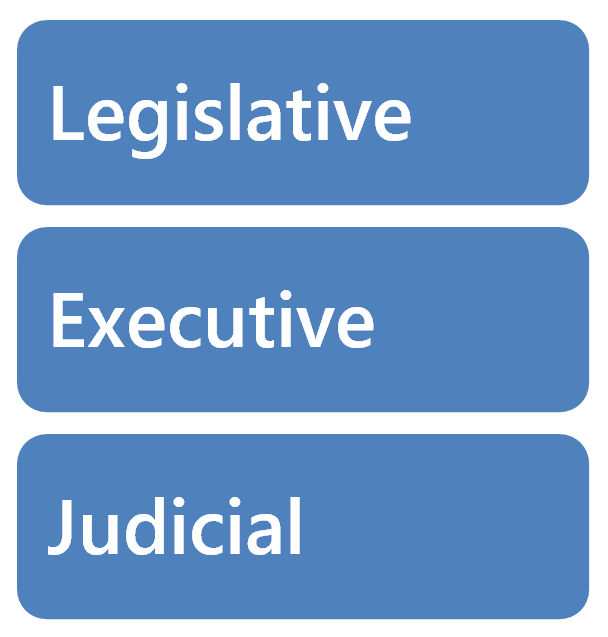
The separation of powers: legislature, executive and judiciary.

The judiciary (also known as the judicial system, judicial power, judicature, judicial branch, judiciative branch, and court or judiciary system) is the system of courts that adjudicates legal disputes/disagreements and interprets, defends, and applies the law in legal cases.

== Meaning ==
The judiciary is the system of courts that applies the law and contracts. Under the doctrine of the separation of powers, the judiciary generally does not make statutory law (which is the responsibility of the legislature) or enforce law (which is the responsibility of the executive), but rather interprets, defends, and applies the law to the facts of each case. However, in some countries the judiciary does make common law.

In many jurisdictions the judicial branch has the power of judicial interpretation, judicial review and constitutional review. Courts with judicial review power may annul the laws and rules of the state when it finds them incompatible with other laws, such as primary legislation, constitution, treaties or international law.

The judiciary can also be thought of as a nonviolent mechanism for conflict resolution. Political bias, sentencing disparities, and higher leniency than the public reduce the political legitimacy of the judiciary. Public confidence in the judiciary varies by country according to opinion polls.

== History in Europe ==
This is a more general overview of the development of the judiciary and judicial systems over the course of history.

=== Roman judiciary ===
==== Archaic Roman Law (650–264 BC) ====
The most important part was Ius Civile (Latin for "civil law"). This consisted of Mos Maiorum (Latin for "way of the ancestors") and Leges (Latin for "laws"). Mos Maiorum was a set of rules of conduct based on social norms created over the years by predecessors. In 451–449 BC, the Mos Maiorum was written down in the Twelve Tables.

Leges were rules set by the leaders, first the kings, later the popular assembly during the Republic. In these early years, the legal process consisted of two phases. The first phase, In Iure, was the judicial process. One would go to the head of the judicial system (at first the priests as law was part of religion) who would look at the applicable rules to the case. Parties in the case could be assisted by jurists. Then the second phase would start, the Apud Iudicem. The case would be put before the judges, which were normal Roman citizens in an uneven number. They were orators rather than jurists. There were no rules of evidence, and little recourse against an adverse judgment.

==== Pre-classical Roman Law (264–27 BC) ====
The most important change in this period was the shift from priest to praetor as the head of the judicial system. The praetor would also make an edict in which he would declare new laws or principles for the year he was elected. This edict is also known as praetorian law.

==== Principate (27 BC – 284 AD) ====
The Principate is the first part of the Roman Empire, which started with the reign of Augustus. This time period is also known as the "classical era of Roman Law" In this era, the praetor's edict was now known as edictum perpetuum which were all the edicts collected in one edict by Hadrian. Also, a new judicial process came up: cognitio extraordinaria (Latin for "extraordinary process"). This came into being due to the largess of the empire. This process only had one phase, where the case was presented to a professional judge who was a representative of the emperor. Appeal was possible to the immediate superior.

During this time period, legal experts started to come up. They studied the law and were advisors to the emperor. They also were allowed to give legal advice on behalf of the emperor.

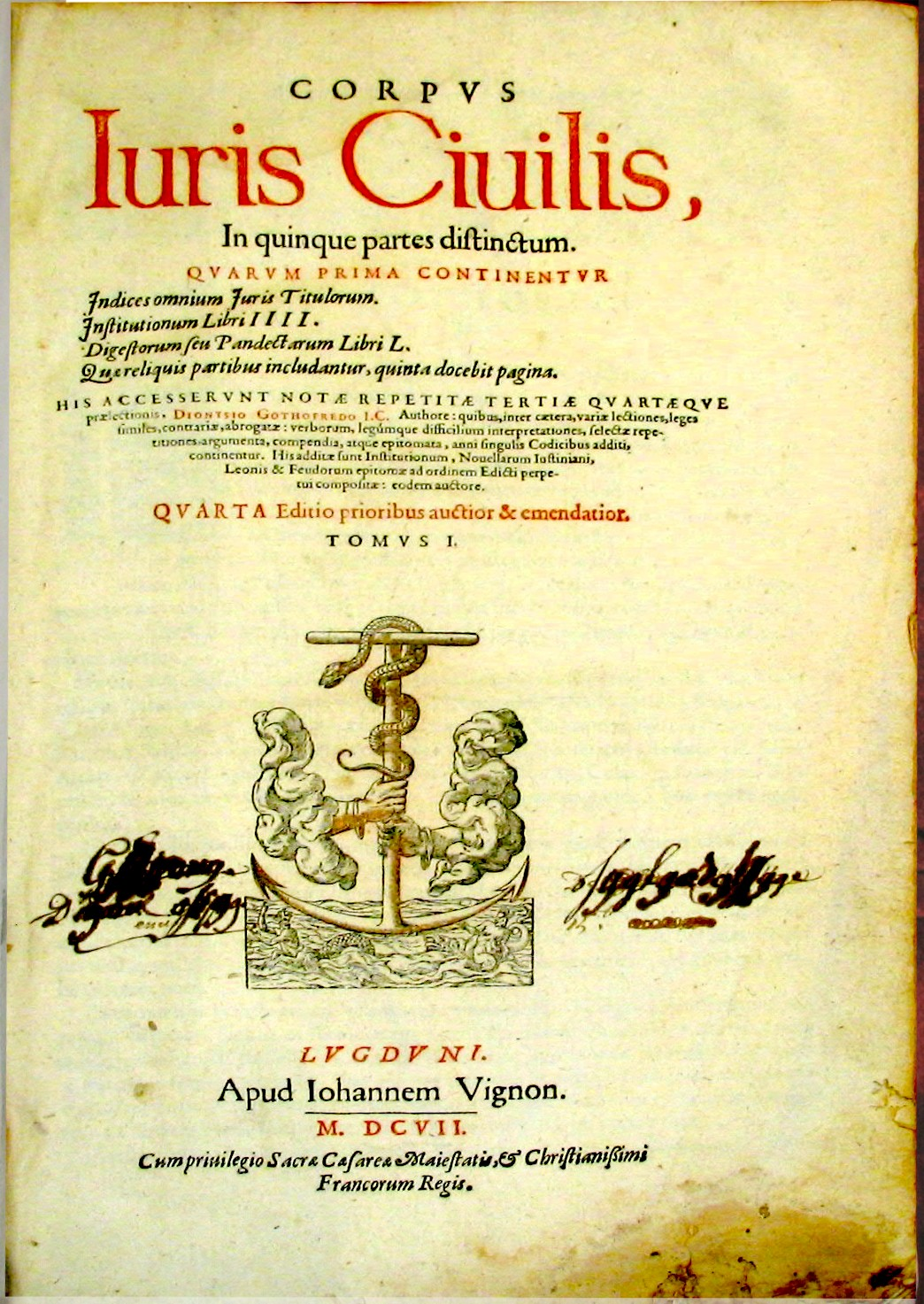
Corpus Iuris Civilis, 1607

==== Dominate (284–565 AD) ====
This era is also known as the "post-classical era of Roman law". The most important legal event during this era was the Codification by Justinianus: the Corpus Iuris Civilis. This contained all Roman Law. It was both a collection of the work of the legal experts and commentary on it, and a collection of new laws. The Corpus Iuris Civilis consisted of four parts:

1. Institutiones: This was an introduction and a summary of Roman law.
2. Digesta/Pandectae: This was the collection of the edicts.
3. Codex: This contained all the laws of the emperors.
4. Novellae: This contained all new laws created.

=== Middle Ages ===
During the late Middle Ages, education started to grow. First education was limited to the monasteries and abbeys, but expanded to cathedrals and schools in the city in the 11th century, eventually creating universities. The universities had five faculties: arts, medicine, theology, canon law and Ius Civile, or civil law. Canon law, or ecclesiastical law are laws created by the Pope, head of the Roman Catholic Church. The last form was also called secular law, or Roman law. It was mainly based on the Corpus Iuris Civilis, which had been rediscovered in 1070. Roman law was mainly used for "worldly" affairs, while canon law was used for questions related to the church.

The period starting in the 11th century with the discovery of the Corpus Iuris Civilis is also called the Scholastics, which can be divided in the early and late scholastics. It is characterised with the renewed interest in the old texts.

According to Kenneth Pennington, an expert of legal history, the sources of medieval law are diverse and include consilia, decretals, conciliar canons, and Spanish procedural tracts. The true mind of medieval judges is unknowable, he says, and "scholars who know norms that the jurists created in the jurisprudence of procedure have a much better chance of reading the sources correctly than those who do not".

==== Ius Civile ====
===== Early scholastics (1070–1263) =====
The rediscovery of the Digesta from the Corpus Iuris Civilis led the university of Bologna to start teaching Roman law. Professors at the university were asked to research the Roman laws and advise the Emperor and the Pope with regard to the old laws. This led to the Glossators to start translating and recreating the Corpus Iuris Civilis and create literature around it:

- Glossae: translations of the old Roman laws
- Summae: summaries
- Brocardica: short sentences that made the old laws easier to remember, a sort of mnemonic
- Quaestio Disputata (sic et non): a dialectic method of seeking the argument and refute it.

Accursius wrote the Glossa Ordinaria in 1263, ending the early scholastics.

===== Late scholastics (1263–1453) =====
The successors of the Glossators were the Post-Glossators or Commentators. They looked at a subject in a logical and systematic way by writing comments with the texts, treatises and consilia, which are advises given according to the old Roman law.

==== Canon Law ====
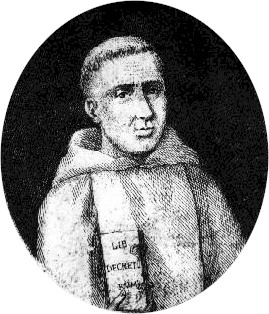
Gratian

===== Early Scholastics (1070–1234) =====
Canon law knows a few forms of laws: the canones, decisions made by Councils, and the decreta, decisions made by the Popes. The monk Gratian, one of the well-known decretists, started to organise all of the church law, which is now known as the Decretum Gratiani, or simply as Decretum. It forms the first part of the collection of six legal texts, which together became known as the Corpus Juris Canonici. It was used by canonists of the Roman Catholic Church until Pentecost (19 May) 1918, when a revised Code of Canon Law (Codex Iuris Canonici) promulgated by Pope Benedict XV on 27 May 1917 obtained legal force.

===== Late Scholastics (1234–1453) =====
The Decretalists, like the post-glossators for Ius Civile, started to write treatises, comments and advises with the texts.

==== Ius Commune ====
Around the 15th century, a process of reception and acculturation started with both laws. The final product was known as Ius Commune. It was a combination of canon law, which represented the common norms and principles, and Roman law, which were the actual rules and terms. It meant the creation of more legal texts and books and a more systematic way of going through the legal process. In the new legal process, appeal was possible. The process would be partially inquisitorial, where the judge would actively investigate all the evidence before him, but also partially adversarial, where both parties are responsible for finding the evidence to convince the judge.

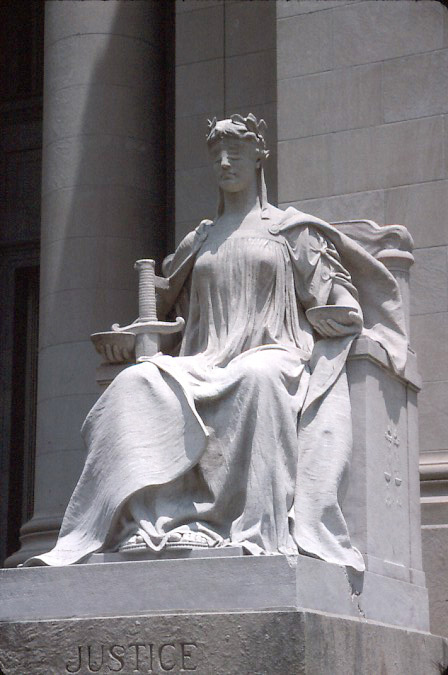
Lady Justice (Latin: Justicia), symbol of the judiciary. Statue at Shelby County Courthouse, Memphis, Tennessee

After the French Revolution, lawmakers stopped interpretation of law by judges, and the legislature was the only body permitted to interpret the law; this prohibition was later overturned by the Napoleonic Code.

The rules of procedure supposedly followed by medieval judges were part of the pan-European system of norms known as ius commune, and probably offered a modicum of protection from harsh punishments like torture, Auto-da-fé and capital punishment. In practice, medieval judges were influenced by ideology and the interests of the powerful. While procedural rules did not extend judicial protection to heretics, the poor and political opponents, procedural rules contain valuable clues about the substantive norms that drove judicial decisiomaking in the Middle Ages.

== Functions of the judiciary in different law systems ==
In common law jurisdictions, courts interpret law; this includes constitutions, statutes, and regulations. They also make law (but in a limited sense, limited to the facts of particular cases) based upon prior case law in areas where the legislature has not made law. For instance, the tort of negligence is not derived from statute law in most common law jurisdictions. The term common law refers to this kind of law. Common law decisions set precedent for all courts to follow. This is sometimes called stare decisis.

=== Country-specific functions ===
In the United States court system, the Supreme Court is the final authority on the interpretation of the federal Constitution and all statutes and regulations created pursuant to it, as well as the constitutionality of the various state laws; in the US federal court system, federal cases are tried in trial courts, known as the US district courts, followed by appellate courts and then the Supreme Court. State courts, which try 98% of litigation, may have different names and organization; trial courts may be called "courts of common plea", appellate courts "superior courts" or "commonwealth courts". The judicial system, whether state or federal, begins with a court of first instance, is appealed to an appellate court, and then ends at the court of last resort.

In France, the final authority on the interpretation of the law is the Council of State for administrative cases, and the Court of Cassation for civil and criminal cases.

In the People's Republic of China, the final authority on the interpretation of the law is the National People's Congress.

Other countries such as Argentina have mixed systems that include lower courts, appeals courts, a cassation court (for criminal law) and a Supreme Court. In this system the Supreme Court is always the final authority, but criminal cases have four stages, one more than civil law does. On the court sits a total of nine justices. This number has been changed several times.

== Judicial systems by country ==
=== Japan ===
Japan's process for selecting judges is longer and more stringent than in various countries, like the United States and in Mexico. Assistant judges are appointed from those who have completed their training at the Legal Training and Research Institute located in Wako. Once appointed, assistant judges still may not qualify to sit alone until they have served for five years, and have been appointed by the Supreme Court of Japan. Judges require ten years of experience in practical affairs, as a public prosecutor or practicing attorney. In the Japanese judicial branch there is the Supreme Court, eight high courts, fifty district courts, fifty family courts, and 438 summary courts.

=== Mexico ===
Justices of the Mexican Supreme Court are appointed by the President of Mexico, and then are approved by the Mexican Senate to serve for a twelve-year term. Other justices are appointed by the Supreme Court and serve for six years. Federal courts consist of the 9 ministers of the Supreme Court, 32 circuit tribunals and 98 district courts. The Supreme Court of Mexico is located in Mexico City. Supreme Court Judges must be of ages 35 to 65 upon appointment and hold a law degree during the five years preceding their nomination.

=== United States ===
United States Supreme Court justices are appointed by the President of the United States and approved by the United States Senate. The Supreme Court justices serve for life term or until retirement. The Supreme Court is located in Washington, D.C. The United States federal court system consists of 94 federal judicial districts. The 94 districts are then divided up into twelve regional circuits. The United States has five different types of courts that are considered subordinate to the Supreme Court: United States bankruptcy courts, United States Court of Appeals for the Federal Circuit, United States Court of International Trade, United States courts of appeals, and United States district courts.

Immigration courts are not part of the judicial branch; immigration judges are employees of the Executive Office for Immigration Review, part of the United States Department of Justice in the executive branch.

Each state, district and inhabited territory also has its own court system operating within the legal framework of the respective jurisdiction, responsible for hearing cases regarding state and territorial law. All these jurisdictions also have their own supreme courts (or equivalent) which serve as the highest courts of law within their respective jurisdictions.

== See also ==
- Bench (law)
- Supreme court
- Political corruption
- Judicial independence
- Judicial reform
- Judicial review
- Rule according to higher law
- Rule of law
