= List of social movements =

Social movements are groupings of individuals or organizations which focus on political or social issues.

This list excludes the following:

- Artistic movements: see list of art movements.
- Independence movements: see lists of active separatist movements and list of historical separatist movements
- Revolutionary movements: see List of revolutions and rebellions
- Religious and spiritual movements: see List of religions and spiritual traditions and List of new religious movements

== List ==
=== International ===
- Abolitionist movement
- Alternative movement
- Animal Rebellion
- Animal rights movement
- Anti-capitalism
- Anti-consumerism
- Anti-corporate activism
- Anti-fascism
- Anti-globalization movement
- Anti-jock movement
- Anti-liberalism
- Anti-nuclear movement
- Anti-psychiatry movement
- Anti-vaccination movement
- Anti-war movement
- Anti-work movement
- Arab Spring
- Architectural Uprising
- Autism rights movement
- Boycott, Divestment, and Sanctions
- Brights movement
- Children's rights movement
- Climate movement
- Conservation movement
- Cooperative movement
- Counterculture movement
- Cultural movement
- Decolonization
- Decretalist
- Decretist
- Disability rights movement
- Earth First!
- Ecofeminism
- Ecomasculinity
- Economy for the Common Good
- Effective altruism
- Environmental justice movement
- Environmental movement
- Esperanto movement
- Ethiopian movement
- Extinction Rebellion
- Fair trade movement
- Feminist movement
- Free culture movement
- Free love
- Free school movement
- Free software movement
- Fridays for Future
- Gaza war protests
- Gen Z protests
- Global citizens movement
- Global justice movement
- Goliards
- Hizmet movement
- Hot Girl Walk
- Human rights movement
- Identitarian movement
- Immigrant rights movement
- Indigenous peoples movement
- Indigenous movements in the Americas
- Labor movement
- LGBT rights opposition
- LGBT social movements
- Mad Pride (psychiatric social movement)
- Masculinism movement
- Men's liberation movement
- Men's rights movement
- Me Too movement
- Multiculturalism
- Neo-Slavism
- Neostoicism
- Nonviolence movement
- Occupy movement
- Organic movement
- Peace movement
- Plogging
- Psychiatric survivors movement
- Reform movements
- Right to health
- Right to life
- Scouting Movement
- Skeptical movement
- Sex-positive movement
- Sex Workers' Rights Movement
- Situationist International
- Slow Food movement
- Slow movement
- Social democracy
- Soviet Jewry Movement
- Student movement
- Temperance movement
- The Zeitgeist Movement
- Veganism
- Via Campesina - 150 million peasants advocating food sovereignty
- Voluntary Human Extinction Movement
- White Power Movement
- Wikimedia movement
- Women's liberation movement
- Women's suffrage
- Workplace spirituality

=== Austria ===
- Austro-Slavism
- Galician Russophilia

=== Brazil ===
- Landless Workers' Movement (MST)

=== China ===
- New Enlightenment
- New Life Movement
- Red guards

=== Circassia ===
- National Oath

=== Croatia ===
- Illyrian movement

=== Czechia ===
- Czech National Revival

=== Germany ===
- Berlin movement
- Lebensreform

=== Greece ===
- Greece Aganaktismenoi movements

=== Hong Kong ===
- Anti-Extradition Law Amendment Bill Movement
- Umbrella Movement

=== India ===
- 2017 pro-jallikattu protests
- India Against Corruption
- Namantar Andolan (Change Movement among Dalits)
- Narmada Bachao Andolan
- Non-cooperation movement
- Salt March (Salt Satyagraha movement)
- Selfie With Daughter

=== Iran ===
- White Wednesdays

=== Ireland ===
- 20x20 movement

=== Israel ===
- Gaza war protests in Israel

=== Italy ===
- Guelphs and Ghibellines

=== Jamaica ===
- Rastafari movement

=== Japan ===
- Freedom and People's Rights Movement
- Taishō Democracy Movement

=== Malaysia ===
- Gerakan Harapan Baru (New Hope Movement in Malaysia)

=== Mexico ===
- List of Gaza war protests at universities in the Netherlands in 2024

=== Netherlands ===
- Popular Assembly of the Peoples of Oaxaca

=== Pakistan ===
- Lawyers' Movement in Pakistan

=== Poland ===
- Enthronement movement
- Sanation

=== Russia ===
- Going to the People
- Pochvennichestvo
- Russian nihilist movement
- Slavophilia
- Smenovekhovtsy
- Westernizer

=== Saudi Arabia ===
- The Bees Army

=== South Africa ===
- Black Consciousness Movement
- Landless Peoples Movement (South Africa)
- Rural People's Movement
- South African Unemployed Peoples' Movement
- Treatment Action Campaign - movement struggling for HIV/AIDS treatment in South Africa
- Western Cape Anti-Eviction Campaign South African movement struggling against evictions

=== South Korea ===
- 4B movement
- New Right

=== Sweden ===
- Gothicism

=== Taiwan ===
- Tangwai movement

=== United Kingdom ===
- Anti-Apartheid Movement
- Time to Change

=== United States ===
- 9/11 Truth movement
- Abolish ICE
- ACT UP
- Alt-right
- Asian American movement
- Black Lives Matter
- Black Power movement
- Chautauqua
- Chicano Movement
- Civil rights movement
- Efficiency movement
- Farm-to-table movement
- Farm Worker Movement
- Gaza war protests in the United States
- Health at Every Size
- Health freedom movement
- Hippie movement
- Indivisible movement
- Lily-white movement
- March For Our Lives movement
- Mothers Against Drunk Driving
- National Cleanup Day
- Occupy Wall Street
- Pro-choice movement
- Pro-life movement
- Psilocybin decriminalization in the United States
- QAnon
- Rape crisis movement
- Reproductive justice
- Sunrise Movement
- Tea Party movement
- Time's Up (movement)
- Women Against War
- Woman's Exchange Movement
