= Huguccio =

Italian canon lawyer

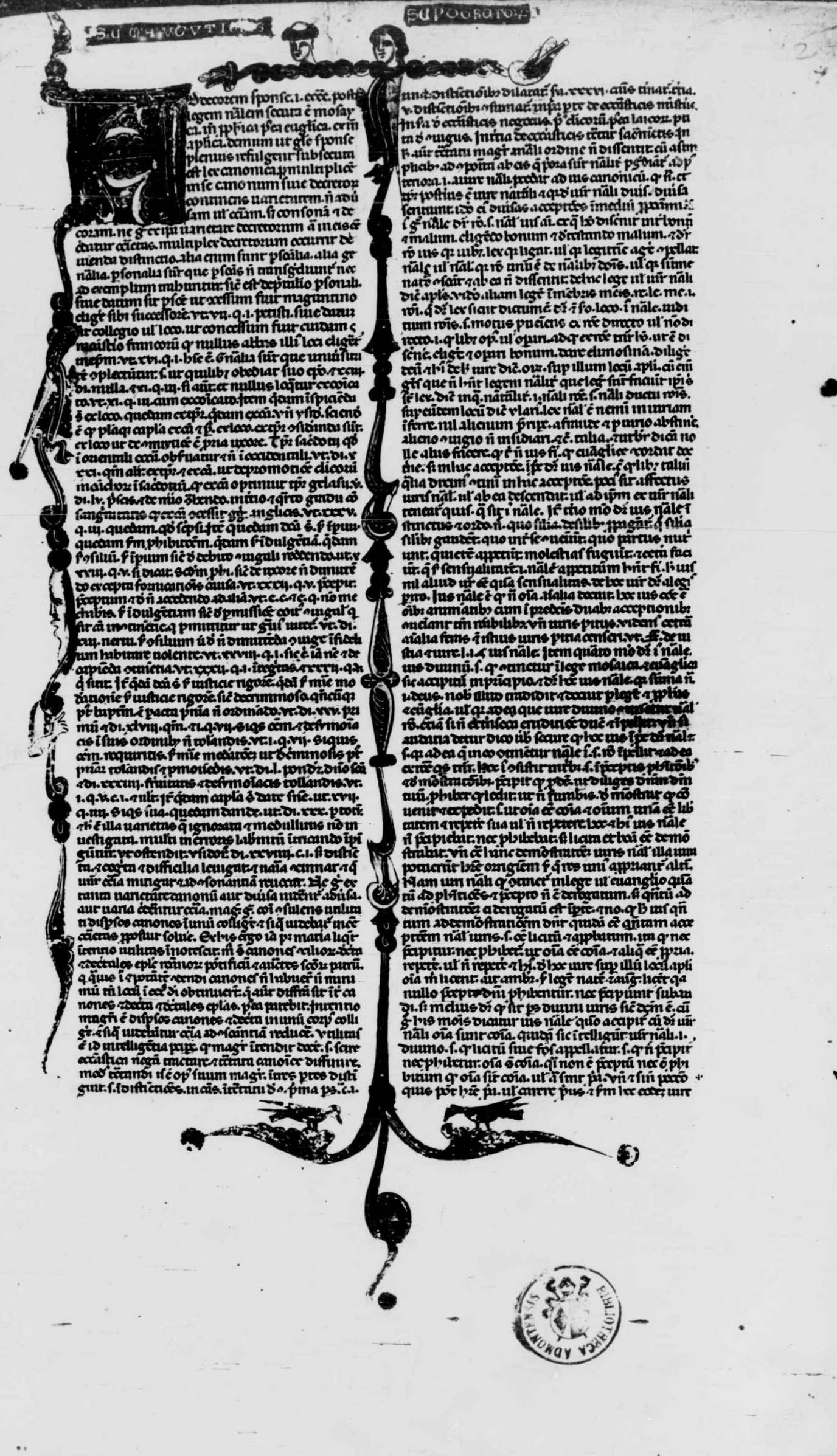
The Summa Decretorum of Huguccio

Huguccio (Hugh of Pisa, Uguccio) (c. 1140 – died 1210) was an Italian canon lawyer.

== Biography ==
Huguccio studied at Bologna, probably under Gandolphus, and taught canon law in the same city, perhaps in the school connected with the monastery of SS. Nabore e Felice. He is believed to have become Bishop of Ferrara in 1190.

Among his supposed pupils was Lotario de' Conti, afterwards Pope Innocent III, who held him in high esteem as is shown by the important cases which the pontiff submitted to him, traces of which still remain in the "Corpus Juris" (c. Coram, 34, X, I, 29). Two letters addressed by Innocent III to Huguccio were inserted in the Decretals of Gregory IX (c. Quanto, 7, X, IV, 19; c. In quadam, 8, X, III,41). However, Innocent probably was not well acquainted with Huguccio's ideas on the Eucharist when he issued the decretal Cum Marthae (X 3.41.16).

He wrote a "Summa" on the "Decretum" of Gratian, concluded according to some in 1187, according to others after 1190, the most extensive and perhaps the most authoritative commentary of that time. He omits, however, in the commentary the second part of the Causae of the Decretum of Gratian, Causae xxiii-xxvi, a gap which was filled by Johannes de Deo.

Huguccio argued, in a widely known opinion, that a pope who fell into heresy automatically lost his see, without the necessity of a formal judgment.

Along with Gratian's Decretum, Huguccio's Summa contains opinions (i.e. Causa 27, quaestio 1, chapter 23, ad v; Distinction 23, chapter 25; Causa 33, quaestio 5, chapter 13) about deaconesses, women, and hermaphrodites.

== The Summa ==
Huguccio's Summa on Gratian's Decretum, drawn up between 1180 and 1190, is a synthesis of the ideas of the School (and notably of the thought of Rufinus and Simon of Bisignano), the thought of the French Decretalists, political practice as it had developed at the time of Alexander III, and Roman law. Huguccio's work constitutes a sort of apogee that would influence not just the Anglo-Norman school but also, directly or indirectly, all later canon law (the bull Per venerabilem is a good example of this) and indeed the whole political and religious reality of Europe. An ardent defender of the independence of the Church, he put the pope at the summit of the Catholic hierarchy, though the Church, in his eyes, consisted in the mass of believers (since the Church was founded mainly on Christ and only secondarily on Saint Peter); he considered that the Church could have “neither spot nor stain” and that it could not err. The pope could not be judged, save in case of heresy (determined by the cardinals) since he then became “less than the last of Christians” (but the heresy must be public); otherwise, the pope's judgment prevailed over that of the council (likewise, in case of opposition between all the bishops of a Church and the pope, it was the latter who prevailed). In relations between Church and Empire, Huguccio comes across as a partisan of the Holy See; thus, against the communis opinio, he alleged that clerics could not be brought before a lay court in feudal matters. Nevertheless, he accorded an independence to the emperor (and he put kings and cities on the same level), since the two powers came from God: he thought that the emperor drew his legitimacy from election and that coronation by the pope simply authorized him to change his title from “king of Germany” to “emperor”. The pope could depose the emperor (ratione peccati or casualiter), but his subjects could never do so; nevertheless, the emperor did not have the same faculty vis-à-vis the pope (the privilege accorded by Pope Adrian I to Charlemagne created no vested right for the emperor) since, although the two powers came from God (Christ had acted as king and priest) and although the Empire had existed before the papacy, the spiritual sword remained superior to temporal authority and it was this superiority that authorized the (measured) intervention of the pope in temporal affairs. Huguccio was also interested in the sources of law, the theory of contracts, and marriage.

== Huguccio the grammarian ==
Huguccio the canon lawyer has traditionally been identified with the grammarian Huguccio Pisanus (Hugh of Pisa; Italian Uguccione da Pisa). The grammarian's principal work was the Magnae Derivationes or Liber derivationum, which dealt with etymologies, and was based on the earlier Derivationes of Osbernus of Gloucester. This identification of the two Huguccios as the same man dates back to a short biography compiled by the Italian historian Mauro Sarti, published posthumously in 1769. However, it has been challenged by Wolfgang Müller. While there is too little biographical evidence to be certain either way, Müller argues that the canon lawyer who went on to become Bishop of Ferrara is to be distinguished from the grammarian who was born in Pisa.
