= Carlo Sebastiano Berardi =

Italian Roman Catholic priest and canon lawyer

Carlo Sebastiano Berardi (b. at Oneglia, Italy, 26 August 1719; d. 3 August 1768) was an Italian Roman Catholic priest and canon lawyer.

== Life ==
Having studied theology at Savona under the Piarists, he was promoted to the priesthood and then began the study of law at Turin, paying particular attention to canonical jurisprudence. In 1749, he was appointed prefect of the law-faculty of the University of Turin, while from 1754 till his death, he was professor of canon law in the same institution.

== Works ==
Berardi's works are:

- (1) "Gratiani canones genuini ab apocryphis discreti, corrupti ad emendatiorum codicum fidem exacti, difficiliores commodâ interpretatione illustrati" (4 vols. quarto, Turin, 1752–57; Venice, 1777, 1783).

This is an esteemed critical exposition of Gratian's Decretum, sometimes ranked second only to Antonio Agustín y Albanell's work. It sets forth the original authorities of the Decretum, though clumsy at distinguishing genuine sources from those that are spurious. A compendium of this work by an unknown writer, published at Venice, 1778, is entitled, "Compendium Commentariorum Caroli Sebastiani Berardi in Canones Gratiani."

- (2) "De Variis Sacrorum Canonum Collectionibus ante Gratianum", published together with his first work.
- (3) "Commentaria in Jus Ecclesiasticum Universum", four vols. quarto, Turin, 1766; two vols. octavo, Venice, 1778, 1789; 1847).
- (4) "Institutiones Juris Ecclesiastici" (2 vols. Turin, 1769).

== Bibliography ==
  - Weurnz, Jus Decretalium (Rome, 1898), I, n. 315, 396, 397;
  - Johann Friedrich von Schulte, Die Geschichte d. Quellen, III, par. 1, 524;
  - VALLAURI, Storia delle Università degli Studi del Piemonte, III, 219.
  - Francesco Margiotta Broglio Carlo Sebastiano Berardi in Dizionario Biografico degli Italiani, Volume 8 (1966)
