= Decretist =

Interpreter of medieval Canon law

In the history of canon law, a decretist was a student and interpreter of the Decretum Gratiani. Like Gratian, the decretists sought to provide "a harmony of discordant canons" (concordia discordantium canonum), and they worked towards this through glosses (glossae) and summaries (summae) on Gratian. They are contrasted with the decretalists, whose work primarily focused on papal decretals.

Early decretists of the Italian school include Paucapalea, a possible pupil of Gratian's; Rufinus, who wrote the Summa Decretorum; and Huguccio, who wrote the Summa Super Decreta, the most extensive decretist work. There was also a French school of decretists starting with Stephen of Tournai.
