= Legal opinion =

Written interpretation of the law as applied to a particular question or case

In law, a legal opinion is in certain jurisdictions a written explanation by a judge or group of judges that accompanies an order or ruling in a case, laying out the rationale and legal principles for the ruling. In other jurisdictions, a legal opinion is not an explanation from a judge, but an opinion from a lawyer, outlining their understanding of the law.

In jurisdictions where legal opinions are prepared by judges, they usually published at the direction of the court, and to the extent, they contain pronouncements about what the law is and how it should be interpreted, they reinforce, change, establish, or overturn legal precedent. If a court decides that an opinion should be published, the opinion may be included in a volume from a series of books called law reports ('reporters' in the United States). Published opinions of courts are also collectively referred to as case law, and constitute in the common law legal systems one of the major sources of law.

In jurisdictions where a legal opinion refers to the work of a lawyer, not a judge, the opinion is usually covered by solicitor-client privilege and is not public. The lawyer provides the opinion to their client, to assist the client in deciding what course of action to take.

== Judicial opinions ==
Not every case decided by a higher court results in the publication of an opinion; in fact, many cases do not, since an opinion is often published only when the law is being interpreted in a novel way, or the case is a high-profile matter of general public interest and the court wishes to make the details of its ruling public.

In the majority of US cases, the judges issue a memorandum decision that indicates how state or federal law applies to the case and affirms or reverses the decision of the lower court. A memorandum decision does not establish legal precedent or reinterpret the law, and cannot be invoked in subsequent cases to justify a ruling. Opinions, on the other hand, always establish a particular legal interpretation.

== Legal opinions of counsel or government law officers ==
In the United Kingdom and other common law countries, a legal opinion refers to written legal advice on a point of law prepared by a lawyer. The lawyer can be working in private practice or in government. Where the opinion is given by a foreign lawyer or foreign law firm it is usually referred to as a 'foreign legal opinion'.

The latter form of opinion is sometimes made available to the public either because of public pressure (see for example Lord Goldsmith's opinion on the Iraq War, Yoo memo), or because a general clarification of the law is called for (see for example, the Yorke–Talbot slavery opinion). In the United States, several state attorneys general issue attorney general's opinions.

Several areas of commercial practice call for formal legal opinions of counsel. The Legal Aid scheme in the United Kingdom requires a legal opinion showing reasonable prospects for success before the Legal Aid board will fund any claim. Insurance policies for professional negligence will frequently require an opinion of counsel before the insurer is required to pay out on any putative claim (sometimes called a QC clause, when it must be an opinion of leading counsel).

== Legal opinion in commercial transactions ==
In commercial transactions, particularly in the context of financing, the lender will require an opinion as to the corporate capacity of the borrower and enforceability of the transaction documents the borrower is intended to enter into. This type of opinion is generally issued by the borrower's counsel or the lender's counsel, depending on the ethical rule governing the issuance of those opinion applicable to the jurisdiction. When the subject company is from a foreign jurisdiction, the opinion will often be referred to as a foreign legal opinion.

== See also ==
- Appellate court
- Case law
- Consilia – a historic medical opinion
- Law reports or reporters
- Memorandum opinion
- Judicial genre
- Judicial interpretation
