= Stephen of Tournai =

Roman Catholic canonist

Stephen of Tournai (18 March 1128 - 11 September 1203) was a Canon regular of Sainte-Geneviève (Paris), and Roman Catholic canonist who became bishop of Tournai in 1192.

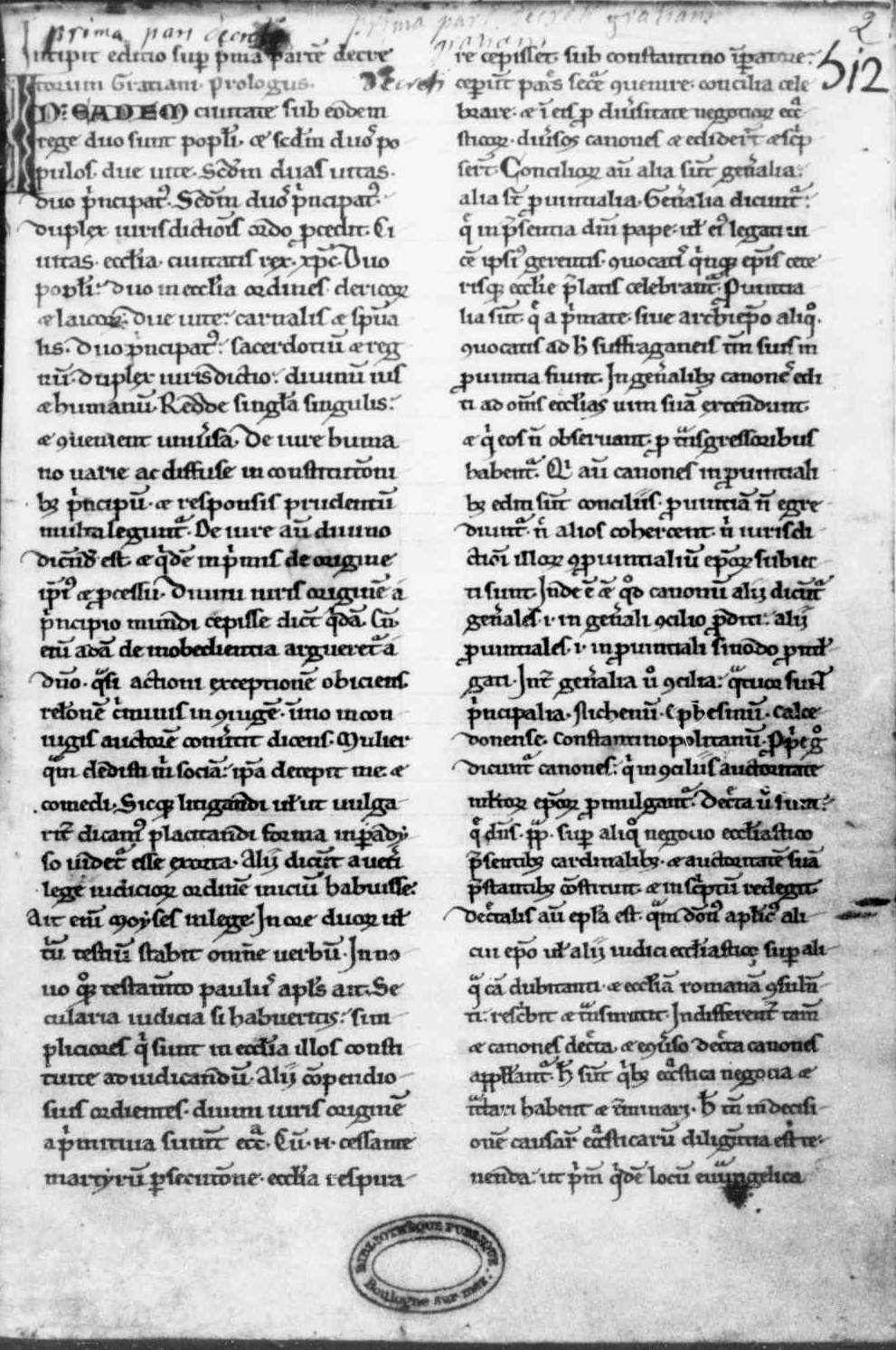
Summa Decreti, 13th-century manuscript. Boulogne-sur-Mer, Bibliothèque des Annonciades, Fonds ancien, ms. 119.

== Biography ==
He was born at Orléans in 1128; died at Tournai in September 1203. He entered the Order of the Canons Regular at Saint-Euverte in Orléans about 1150, then studied canon law and Roman law at Bologna university, returning to his monastery in 1160. He was elected abbot of Saint-Euverte in 1167 and of the Abbey of Sainte-Geneviève at Paris in 1177. The latter monastery he almost entirely rebuilt, establishing a monastic school in connexion with it.

In 1192 he became Bishop of Tournai, but was greatly hampered in the exercise of his episcopal functions by the opposition of the people as well as by the interdict placed on France on account of the divorce proceedings of Philip II.

== Works ==
He is the author of a Summa in decretum Gratiani (1159), which is to a great extent based on the similar works of Paucapalea, Rufinus and Rolandus (occasionally mistaken for Pope Alexander III). It was first edited by Johann Friedrich von Schulte (Stephen of Tournai, Die Summa des Stephanus Tornacensis über das Decretum Gratiani, ed. J.F. von Schulte, Giessen 1891.)

His letters, edited by Molinet (Paris, 1679), are printed in Patrologia Latina, CCXI, 309–625.
