= Legist =

Term for an occupation in law

A Legist, from the Latin lex 'law', is any expert or student of law.

It was especially used since the Carolingian dynasty for royal councillors who advised the monarch in legal matters, and specifically helped base its absolutist ambitions on Roman Law. More generally they were teachers of civil or Roman law, who, besides expounding sources, explaining terms, elucidating texts, summarizing the contents of chapters etc., illustrated by cases, real or imaginary, the numerous questions and distinctions arising out of the "Corpus Juris" enactments of the ancient Roman code.

From the twelfth century, when a fresh impulse was given to legal researches, the terms legist and decretist—the latter applied, in the narrower sense, to the interpreter of ecclesiastical canon law and commentator on the canonical texts—have been carefully distinguished.

Legists came to be employed by lower authorities in the feudal pyramid. The rise of universities would lead to academical lawyers taking their place in the western world.

By analogy, the term is also applied to equivalent legal advisers in other traditions, e.g. in Islamic law and/or civil law of the Ottoman Empire.

== Sources ==
- Nouveau petit Larousse illustré, 1952 (in French)
