= Margaritae =

Collections of canon law and decretals

Margaritae are collections of canon law and decretals.

Canon lawyers of the twelfth and thirteenth centuries taught canon law by commenting on the Decretum of Gratian and on the various collections of the Decretals. The margaritae were developed as collections to aid memory. They arranged the more important propositions, denominated "résumés", and axioms in alphabetical order or by subject matter, including mnemonic verse. Many of these margaritae have been preserved, but not all of their authors are certainly known. Some of them have been printed with the Decretum or the Decretals of Gregory IX.
