= Foreign legal opinion =

Opinion on effectiveness of a transaction under foreign law

A foreign legal opinion (or foreign law opinion) is an opinion of a law firm issued in cross-border commercial transactions certifying the effectiveness of the transaction under the applicable foreign law. Foreign legal opinions have become highly standardised over time, and most foreign legal opinions follow a fairly regimented format. The issuance of such opinions has become something of a sub-legal specialisation in itself, and books and articles are written on the subject of foreign legal opinions. A number of organisations issue template format opinions to indicate issues which are intended to be covered by such opinions, or standard form checklists for contents.

== Purpose ==
The original purpose of foreign legal opinion is grounded in the historical doctrine of ultra vires. The concern was that when doing business with a corporation formed in a foreign country, proper due diligence required that a legal opinion be sought to ensure that the relevant foreign company had the necessary capacity and power to enter into the transaction, and that it would be binding upon it. Over time opinions expanded to cover related aspects of foreign law, such as whether payments might be subject to exchange controls or usury laws, whether it was necessary for any of the other parties to hold any licences or permits under the regulatory laws of the foreign country, whether there would be adverse tax consequences under the laws of the foreign country, whether foreign judgments were recognised and enforced in that country other collateral matters.

During the 1970s and 1980s with the expansions in cross-border lender by financial institutions, banks became increasingly concerned to ensure that foreign companies to whom they lent money provided a foreign legal opinion certifying the legal validity of the loan transaction and the enforceability of the banks' rights (including any security interests). In time these requires came to be reflected in the Basel capital adequacy requirements for banks, resulting in different, more favourable, capital weighting for loans supported by opinions.

== Format ==
Foreign legal opinions are now highly standardised. Typically such opinions will confirm the jurisdiction which they relate to, confirm the documents that they reviewed, list certain assumptions of fact, and then set out various opinion statements. After the opinion statements, they will typically make certain standard, generally applicable qualifications.

The opinion will ordinarily state the conclusions of law, but will not provide reasoning. This reflects the role of the foreign law opinion as a risk assessment tool. The opinion is normally issued in the format of an unqualified favourable statement of the effectiveness of the transaction (hedged in by appropriate assumptions of fact and general qualifications of law). Where there are areas of legal uncertainty, or issues which require clarification and analysis, the foreign legal opinion will often remain in the standardised format, but will be supplemented with a second, reasoned, opinion. In cross border transactions the negotiation and discussion of the format of the foreign law opinions elucidates areas of legal stress or risk in relation to the proposed transaction and foreign legal systems.

Standard assumptions normally include assuming that documents and records reviewed by the law firm giving the opinion are accurate, that all copies they review are true copies, and that no provision of any other law (i.e. the laws of any country other than the country on whose laws the opinion is being given) adversely affects the opinion being expressed. In certain countries it is also standard to assume the genuineness of signatures and seals, but in other countries the foreign law firm may be expected to verify the accuracy of such signatures.

The substantive opinion statements a foreign legal opinion will make will ordinarily include:

1. that the relevant obligations be recognised as constituting valid and binding obligations of the foreign party;
2. which person or organ has power on behalf of the foreign entity to enter into the transaction;
3. the proper method of execution of documents by the foreign party;
4. that the transaction does not breach the constitutional documents of the foreign entity, or the laws of the foreign country (and, sometimes, any agreements which are binding upon the foreign entity and its assets);
5. that no approvals or licences are required in the foreign country in relation to the transaction;
6. that the transaction documents are not subject to stamp duty or registration requirements in the foreign country;
7. that no withholding or other taxes apply to the transaction in the foreign country;
8. that the foreign entity does not have sovereign immunity under the laws of the foreign country;
9. that there are no exchange control regulations in the foreign country which would affect the transaction;
10. that the foreign entity is in good standing, and is not subject to winding-up or dissolution;
11. to what extent judgments or arbitral awards from another country would be recognised and enforced in the foreign country (without re-examination of the merits);
12. the efficacy of choice of law clauses and jurisdiction clauses in the foreign jurisdiction;
13. whether any terms of the transaction contravene public policy in the foreign country; and
14. whether any of the other parties to the transaction (other than the foreign entity) would be treated as carrying on business or subject to tax in the foreign country by entering into the transaction.

Standard qualifications are usually matters of general law which it is impractical to advise upon in the abstract, but which might undermine the effectiveness of the enforceability of the transaction. For example most opinions will indicate that if the foreign party goes into bankruptcy that will limit the ability to enforce obligations against it. Similarly, rights may be lost when statutory limitation periods expire. In certain countries enforcement of obligations may be subject to obligations of good faith and fair dealing, and the foreign legal opinion will normally point this out by way of qualification.

== Conflicts of laws ==
The foreign legal opinion will typically express opinions on various issues which might not ordinarily be governed by the laws of the foreign country under its own conflict of laws system. Because a cross border transaction might end up being considered by the courts of any of a number of countries, the addressee(s) of the opinion will wish to be assured that all relevant issues, if determined by that foreign law, would likely be resolved satisfactorily. The courts of a third country may apply different choice of law rules to determine the lex causae of a particular issue to the courts of the foreign country.

== See also ==
- Legal opinion in commercial transactions
