= Poetry in judicial opinions =

While judicial opinions are usually matter-of-fact, technical, and serious, judges occasionally incorporate poetry into their writing. The practice has been criticised as self-aggrandising and demeaning by some scholars, but judges who use verse in their opinions do so to communicate with particular audiences, signal the importance of a case, or to address the emotional components of a legal dispute. For example, legal scholars Edward J. Eberle and Bernhard Grossfeld point to Chief Justice William Rehnquist's dissent in Texas v. Johnson (1989) as a powerful example of using poetic modes in judicial writing to demonstrate an argument.

== Purpose ==
Fisher v. Lowe

We thought that we would never see
A suit to compensate a tree.
A suit whose claim in tort is prest
Upon a mangled tree's behest;
A tree whose battered trunk was prest
Against a Chevy's crumpled crest;
A tree that faces each new day
With bark and limb in disarray;
A tree that may forever bear
A lasting need for tender care.
Flora lovers though we three,
We must uphold the court's decree.
Affirmed

– Judge John H. Gillis

In legal disputes, judges write judicial opinions to display and confront their reasoning for decisions, explain the historical context of the law, and establish precedent for future disputes. Since most disputes can be settled with an opinion, the ambiguities and complications of law, contracts, and social life are prominently displayed in judicial writing. Judicial writing then forms, in part, fields of law by connecting with one another, and they create a kind of commingling jurisprudence through this communication.

Writing an opinion (whether for the majority or otherwise) is an exercise in communicating with a particular audience; not only are opinions read by the parties involved in the underlying dispute, but also students of law, lawyers, judicial colleagues, and the general public. For this reason, judges may take into consideration the style of their writing—typically fact-driven, serious, and technical—and use poetry to entice readers to more closely follow the dispute and understand their reasoning. They may also consider the facts of the dispute; when a case involves a particularly interesting issue, or one that is of interest to the public, judges can use their language to signal its novelty or importance. Judges may also have other motivations to write in verse; in one 1975 case, a judge delivered his opinion in verse because a party demanded it.

Poetry is an outlet for judges to not only pass on information about the dispute, but to also hone their professional writing. While prose allows judges to arrange their thoughts, poetry has inherent constraints that force them to deliberately extract the core issues in the case before them, while also allowing judges to communicate the emotional dimensions of a dispute.

== Analysis ==
For the parties in a legal dispute, judicial poetry can be seen as demeaning. For example, in one case involving a minor sex worker in 1975, a judge described her in verse as a "whore" who "must be adjusted" to "society's rules", and who "while out on parole" would be unlikely to receive support from the "men she used to cajole". He was ultimately censured for his opinion – censured not for the poetic form, but for his descriptions of her. The use of poetry can also be seen as an exercise in self-aggrandisement, as poetry's constraints often force judges to employ deficient and incomplete legal reasoning. Judge Richard Posner wrote that while poetry may effectively summarise a dispute and the legal rationale for a decision, two different poems—unlike two separate pieces of prose—are imbued with alternate meanings that cannot replace one another.

The poetics of judicial writing may also be subdued, where judges rely on turns of phrase and linguistic moves to develop new theories of law. In Katz v. United States (1967), for instance, the Supreme Court of the United States expanded the meaning of the word "search"—once only denoting a physical invasion of property—into a broader reasonable expectation of privacy issue. And in Texas v. Johnson (1989), William Rehnquist's dissent quoted considerably from poetry, hymns, and songs to demonstrate the importance of the American flag. This particular rhetorical move—beginning his dissent with extensive quotations from poetry, and only afterwards advancing to a legal analysis of the issue—is seen by legal scholars Edward J. Eberle and Bernhard Grossfeld as offering a "raw starkness" that argues "more clearly than stare decisis" alone.
