= Judicial genre =

Judicial genre is a particular category of written expression of legal opinions. It shares aspects of associated with distinct Literary genre that are often characterized by distinct attributes of characteristics such as literary technique, tone, and content. Studies indicate that there are sub genera distinctive to the US Supreme Court of the United States, and that this genre is becoming increasingly distinctive with time.

Methods of characterizing judicial genre include metrics such as opinion length, complexity of structure for example use of complex, multi-part opinions with several concurrences and dissents. Robert Ferguson regards Judicial Opinion as a specific literary genre

Analysis of judicial genre is increasing in sophistication for example with metadiscursive analysis in recent high visibility cases. Some of the components of metadiscursive analysis include specific uses of clarifying devices for regular and special concurrences to both support and attack majority opinions.

Michael Xifaras' Theory of Legal Characters ties together literary and judicial genres with a morphism wherein a legal actor performs in a professional role for an audience. This folds in a theatrical metaphor associated with Aristotle's judicial genre' where the actor persuade listeners & audience aiming for a particular decision.
