= Osbern of Gloucester =

Osbern Pinnock of Gloucester (1123–1200) was an English Benedictine monk of St Peter's Abbey, Gloucester, and a lexicographical writer.

His Panormia, or Derivationes (Liber Derivationum), was a Latin word list compiled from about 1150 to 1180. It contained elements of both the glossary of rarer words, and derivations (based on etymology) and so was innovative; but at this stage the two aspects were kept separate. This work was printed by Angelo Mai in 1836 as Thesaurus novus latinitatis; its authorship is a later attribution of Wilhelm Meyer. It was widely circulated, and influenced later work of Huguccio.
