= KC clause =

In insurance law, a KC clause (or, during the reign of a female monarch, a QC clause) is a clause in an insurance policy (usually but not exclusively a professional indemnity insurance policy) that provides that an action against the insured is not to be contested unless a King's Counsel (or KC) advises that the defence has a reasonable prospect of success.

== Overview ==
The principal reason for such clauses is to minimise conflict between the insured and the insurer. The insurer will often wish to settle claims as quickly and cheaply as possible, but the insured may be concerned that paying on a claim implies negligence which will damage their professional reputation, and want to contest the claim regardless. Professional indemnity policies commonly provide that the insurer will pay the legal costs of the defence. It is sometimes suggested that the clause is also designed to protect the public from the unjustified contesting of claims which have no real defence, but this may represent a charitable view of the way insurance companies conduct claims.

== Challenges ==
Conflicts between the insurer and insured can put a solicitor who represents both in an invidious position, particularly where the solicitor has received confidential information from one party, and may result in multiplicity of legal representation. In practice however, there is an enormous reluctance to invoke such clauses, partly because of the expense of instructing King's Counsel to advise, and partly because of the insurer's need to maintain good relations with the insured.

Although still called KC clauses, such clauses often provide that the advice of a junior barrister of a certain seniority may be taken. Some general liability policies contain a converse version the traditional KC clause; viz., that the insurer does not need to pay out on a claim against the insured unless a King's Counsel advises that there is no reasonable prospect of successfully defending the claim. KC clauses were considered judicially by Lord Devlin (in relation to another issue) in West Wake Price & Co v Ching [1956] 3 All ER 821.
