= 20x20 =

Campaign to champion women in sport in Ireland

20x20 (pronounced twenty by twenty) was a two-year initiative to champion girls and women in sport which launched in October 2018 in Ireland.

20x20 was so-called because of its three measurable objectives: to increase media coverage, participation and attendances for women in sport by 20% by the end of 2020. The overall objective was to begin a societal shift in the perception of women's sport so that it could become 'a greater part of our culture'.

The concept was originated by Sarah Colgan and Heather Thornton and driven by Sarah Colgan and Along Came A Spider until it culminated in December 2020.

== Endorsement and sponsorship ==
20x20 was supported by sport in Ireland, principally via a partnership with the Federation of Irish Sport, under CEO Mary O’Connor, and the 76 national governing sporting bodies and local sports partnerships (see index) who signed a 20x20 Charter committing to the aims of the movement.

There were five official 20x20 sponsors: AIG, Investec, KPMG, Lidl and Three and five official media partners: RTÉ, TG4, Off The Ball, SportsJOE and Her. Several universities signed up to the 20x20 Third Level Charter.

== Results ==
Twitter reported #20x20 as the second most-used hashtag in Ireland for social issues in 2019.

Nielsen and Behaviour and Attitudes were commissioned to research benchmark findings before 20x20 launched as well as end of campaign findings across media coverage, participation, attendances in addition to attitudes and the national psyche.

Measuring only the first half of the movement, from September 2018 to September 2019, there was a 13.1% increase in participation.

From September 2018 to September 2019 there was a 17.2% increase in attendances at high-level ticketed events.

From September 2018 to September 2019 there was a 50% increase in women's sport coverage in online media. In September 2018 women in sport accounted for 4% of all sport coverage in online media. By September 2019 (halfway through the 20x20 campaign) it accounted for 6% of all sport in online media. The number of online articles on women's sport saw a 20% increase during the first half of the 20x20 campaign.

From September 2018 to September 2019 there was a 53% increase in women's sport coverage in print media. In September 2018 women in sport accounted for 3% of all sport coverage in print media. By September 2019 (halfway through the campaign) it accounted for 5% of all sport coverage in print media. The number of print articles on women's sport saw a 60% increase from 2018 to 2019 and there was an increase (120%) in the article space dedicated to women's sport.

A key objective for 20x20 was to make women's sport a bigger part of Irish culture by making it more visible. Research commissioned by 20x20 and conducted by Behaviour & Attitudes in 2020, found 80% of Irish adults - rising to 84% of Irish men - said they were more aware of women's sport than before the movement launched in 2018.

76% of those surveyed said they believe that women's sport is seen as ‘cooler’ than before the 20x20 campaign. Of those aware of the campaign, 73% - rising to 75% of men - said that 20x20 changed their mindset positively towards girls and women in sport, with 68% stating they supported women in sport more because of 20x20, and 42% of women (rising to 49% of 18–34 year-olds) saying they participate in more sport because of the movement.

20x20 won awards including 'Sporting Innovation of the Year' at the 2019 Sport Industry Awards, 'Best Public Relations Event' at the 2019 PRCA Awards, 'Highly Commended Best Purpose-Led' in Sport category at the 2021 European Sponsorship Awards, Irish Tatler’s Women of the Year 'Gamechanger Award' for 20x20's two founders, as well as being nominated for 2021 'Best Issues-Led Campaign' PRCA Awards, 2021 Sabre Award, 2020 Sabre Award, 'Best Use of PR' at the 2021 European Sponsorship Awards and 'Best Newcomer', 'Gamechanger' and 'Best Purpose-Led' in Sport category 2020 European Sponsorship Awards.
