= Memorandum opinion =

Under United States legal practice, a memorandum opinion is usually unpublished and cannot be cited as precedent. It is formally defined as: "[a] unanimous appellate opinion that succinctly states the decision of the court; an opinion that briefly reports the court's conclusion, usu. without elaboration because the decision follows a well-established legal principle or does not relate to any point of law."

Generally, memorandum opinions follow ordinary rules, including the application of precedent and the rule of stare decisis. However, in many courts (for example, the Appellate Division of the Supreme Court of New York), the style of analysis in memorandum opinions is much more concise and conclusory than it would be in an opinion intended for publication. That is, long strings of case citations are often inserted without explication or analysis of the applicability of the cited cases. In contrast, the California Constitution requires that all appellate decisions in California must be decided "in writing with reasons stated," which the Supreme Court of California has interpreted as requiring detailed written opinions even in frivolous cases. Nonetheless, the Courts of Appeal have the discretion not to certify opinions in frivolous cases for publication.

Memorandum opinions are often issued in areas of well-settled law or where a particular set of facts may create imprudent case law.

== See also ==
- Published opinion
- Legal opinion
