= Decretalist =

School of interpretation of law

In the history of canon law, the decretalists of the thirteenth century formed a school of interpretation that emphasised the decretals, those letters issued by the Popes ruling on matters of church discipline (epistolae decretales), in preference to the Decretum Gratiani (1141), which their rivals, the decretists, favoured. The decretalists were early compilers of the papal decretals, and their work, such as that of Simon of Bisignano (c. 1177), was used by the dominant decretist school.

The decretalist practice can be divided into three periods. The first (c. 1160–1200) is characterised by the collection of decretals; the second (c. 1200–1234) by the organisation of the collections and the first signs of decretal exegesis, culminating in the promulgation of the Decretals of Gregory IX in 1234; and the final (1234–1348) by extensive exegesis and analysis. Important early decretalists include Bernard of Pavia, who wrote the Summa Decretalium, the Summa de Matrimonio and the Brevarium Extravagantium, and Henry of Susa, whose Summa Copiosa melded canon law with Roman law and was influential into modern times.
