= Simon of Bisignano =

Teacher of canon law

- Born: Bisignano, Calabria, Kingdom of Sicily
- Occupation: Teacher of canon law
- Years active: 1170's
- Known for: Composing "Summa"

Simon of Bisignano was a teacher of canon law in Bologna in the 1170s. He composed a Summa on the Decretum Gratiani between March 1177 and March 1179. Like Paucapalea, he, too, might have been a student of Gratian himself.
