= Hot Girl Walk =

Social media trend

Hot Girl Walk is a social media trend popularised on TikTok. It consists of a 4 miles (6.4 km) outdoor walk where participants think affirmations.

== History ==
In 2020, American University of Southern California student Mia Lind began promoting the concept of the "Hot Girl Walk" on TikTok during the COVID-19 pandemic, describing a four-mile outdoor walk focused on gratitude, personal goals, and self-confidence. Lind, having begun taking walks as a means of relieving stress, posted her first Hot Girl Walk video in January 2021 under her TikTok account "exactlyliketheothergirls", by 2023 her TikTok had gained over six hundred millions views. The name was inspired by "Hot Girl Summer", a 2019 rap song by Megan Thee Stallion.

Lind trademarked the term in 2023 for athletic apparel and physical fitness training, and she subsequently founded a wellness company with the same name, with merchandise, corporate sponsorships, and ambassador-run events in various cities.

The trend garnered some backlash, with other TikTok users criticing it for focusing on optics more than health, as reported by the Australian edition of Elle.

== Trademark clashes ==
Hot Girl Walk LLC sent cease-and-desist letters to community walking groups using similar names. Walking groups in Florida, Utah, and Pennsylvania received legal letters and were required to rebrand. Hot Girl Walk Miami was sued in federal court and forced to rename itself "On the Walk Miami."

One case involved Indianapolis organiser Casey Springer, who had launched a free community walking club. Springer declined to affiliate her group with Lind's brand, citing concerns about Hot Girl Walk's partnership with Weight Watchers and its potential impact on participants with eating disorders. After Springer blocked Lind and did not change the group's name, Hot Girl Walk Indy's Instagram account was reported to Meta for trademark infringement and removed. Lind filed a federal lawsuit against Springer in July 2024 in the United States District Court for the Southern District of Indiana, alleging trademark infringement, business disparagement, and defamation. The case was dismissed 18 days after filing.
