= Johann Friedrich von Schulte =

German legal historian and professor of canon law (1827–1914)

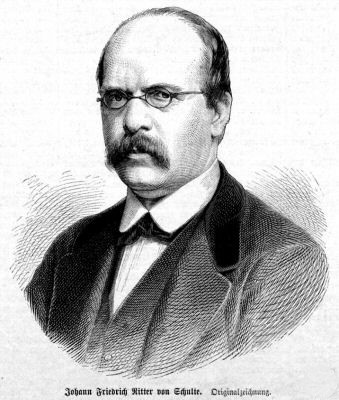
Johann Friedrich von Schulte (1827-1914)

Johann Friedrich von Schulte (April 23, 1827 – December 19, 1914) was a German legal historian and professor of canon law who was born in Winterberg, Westphalia. He was a leading authority on Catholic canon law.

In 1854 he became a lecturer at the University of Bonn, and during the following year was appointed professor of German legal history and canon law at the University of Prague. In 1873 he returned to Bonn, where he was a professor of canon law until 1906. In 1881-82 he was rector at the university.

Schulte opposed the First Vatican Council, and was architect of the basic templates regarding church law for organization of the German Old Catholic Church. He was also author of the Synodal- und Gemeindeordnung (Synodal and Municipal Order) of 1874, the fundamental law of the Old Catholic Church in Germany. From 1871 to 1890 he was president of the Old Catholic Congress.

From 1874 to 1879 he was a member of the German Reichstag (National Liberal Party). He died in Obermais near Meran on December 19, 1914, at the age of 87.

== Selected publications ==
- System des katholischen Kirchenrechts (The system of Catholic church law), 1855
- Die Lehre von den Quellen des katholischen Kirchenrechts (Theory of the sources of Catholic church law), 1860
- Die Rechtsfrage des Einflusses der Regierung bei den Bischofswahlen (The legal question of the influence of the government in the choice of bishops), 1869
- Die Stellung der Konzilien, Päpste und Bischöfe vom historischen und kanonistischen Standpunkte und die päpstliche Konstitution vom 18. Juli 1870 (The Position of Councils, Popes and Bishops from the Historical and Canonical Standpoints and the Papal Constitution, July 18, 1870), 1871
- Die Geschichte der Quellen und Literatur des Kanonischen Rechts von Gratian bis auf die Gegenwart (The History of Literature and Sources of Canon Law of Gratian up to the Present) (1875-1880, four volumes)
- Lehrbuch des Katholischen und Evangelischen Kirchenrechts (Textbook of Catholic and Protestant Church Laws), 1886
- Der Alt-Katholizismus - Geschichte seiner Entwicklung, inneren Gestaltung und rechtlichen Stellung in Deutschland. Aus den Akten und anderen authentischen Quellen dargestellt (Old Catholicism - History of its Development, Interior Composition and Legal Position in Germany, according to Documents and other Authenticated Sources)
- Lebenserinnerungen drei Bände (Memoirs in Three Volumes), 1908-1909)
