= Rufinus (decretist) =

Italian canon lawyer

Rufinus was an Italian canon lawyer, described as the most influential canonist at the University of Bologna in the mid 12th century. He composed a Summa on Gratian's Decretum before 1159, which soon became the most influential commentary in Bologna, surpassing all previous ones in detail and length.

Stephen of Tournai, his pupil, quoted from his Summa several times.
