= Paucapalea =

12th-century canon lawyer

Paucapalea was a canon lawyer of the twelfth century. He produced the first commentary on the Decretum of Gratian, his teacher.
