= Consilia =

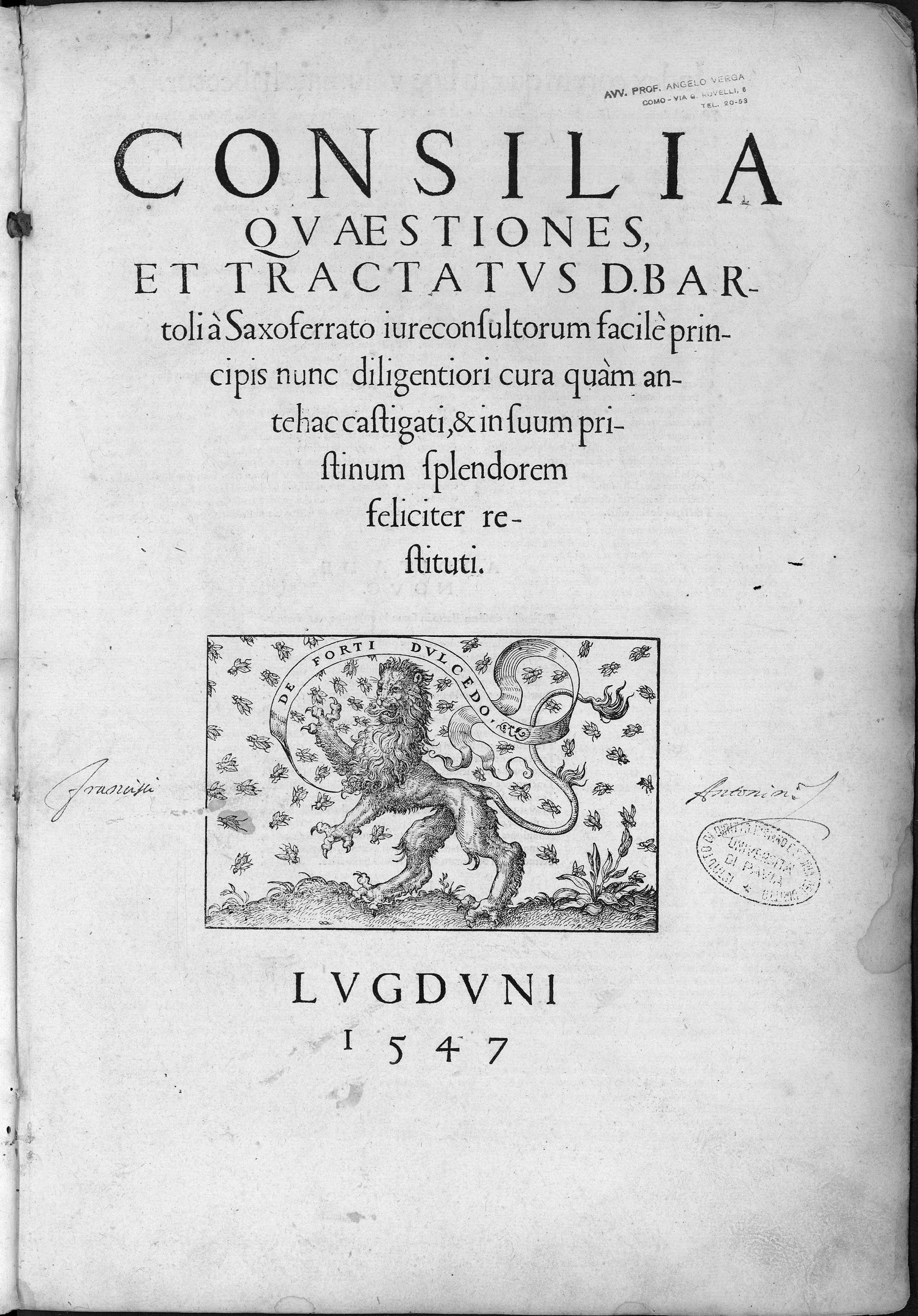

Consilia (plural of consilium, 'advice') is a genre of book, originating in medieval era plagues, where practical advice is given on a medical or other philosophical subject.

== Origin ==
The format was originated by the Florentine doctor of medicine Taddeo Alderotti, under the pressures for down-to-earth advice, based on experiential observations, in treating the Black Death that decimated Italy in 1348 and recurred at generational intervals for the following centuries. A consilium was a doctor's written text in response to a particular case, where the malady had been determined; in the consilium the medical doctor identified the disease and prescribed the appropriate treatment. The accumulation of consilia circulated in manuscript began, for the first time in Europe, to lay down a corpus of medical practice, case-by-case.

Medieval medical writings had tended towards theory rather than praxis, which was denigrated as ars mechanica, mere technician's work unsuited to the higher intellect. Characteristically they took the form of glosses and commentaries on the received texts of Antiquity, of Galen and Dioscurides, with nods towards Aristotle and the shadow of Hippocrates. Medicine was more closely allied in these with philosophy rather than with therapy and prevention; however with the onset of plague, practical experience moved to the forefront of concern.

Alderotti, who practiced and taught in Tuscany and the north of Italy, and served as doctor to Pope Boniface VIII, was a formative figure in the development of the faculty of arts and medicine at the University of Bologna. His more than a hundred consilia based on his clinical observation of actual cases formed the prototypes of a new genre of literature.

== Format ==
Consilia followed a conventional format. The first section recorded the examination of the patient, detailing the patient's age, sex, social station, occupation and place of residence. and a list of the patient's symptoms, which served to identify the malady. A second section prescribed a dietary regime that was to be followed. A final section prescribed specific medications and dosage, with the other interventions available at the time: bleeding, bathing, cauterisation, fumigation.

The Consilia of Gentile da Foligno (died 1348, most probably of the plague) were among the first medical texts to be printed, in the 1470s.
