= Decretum Gratiani =

12th-century anthology of canon law

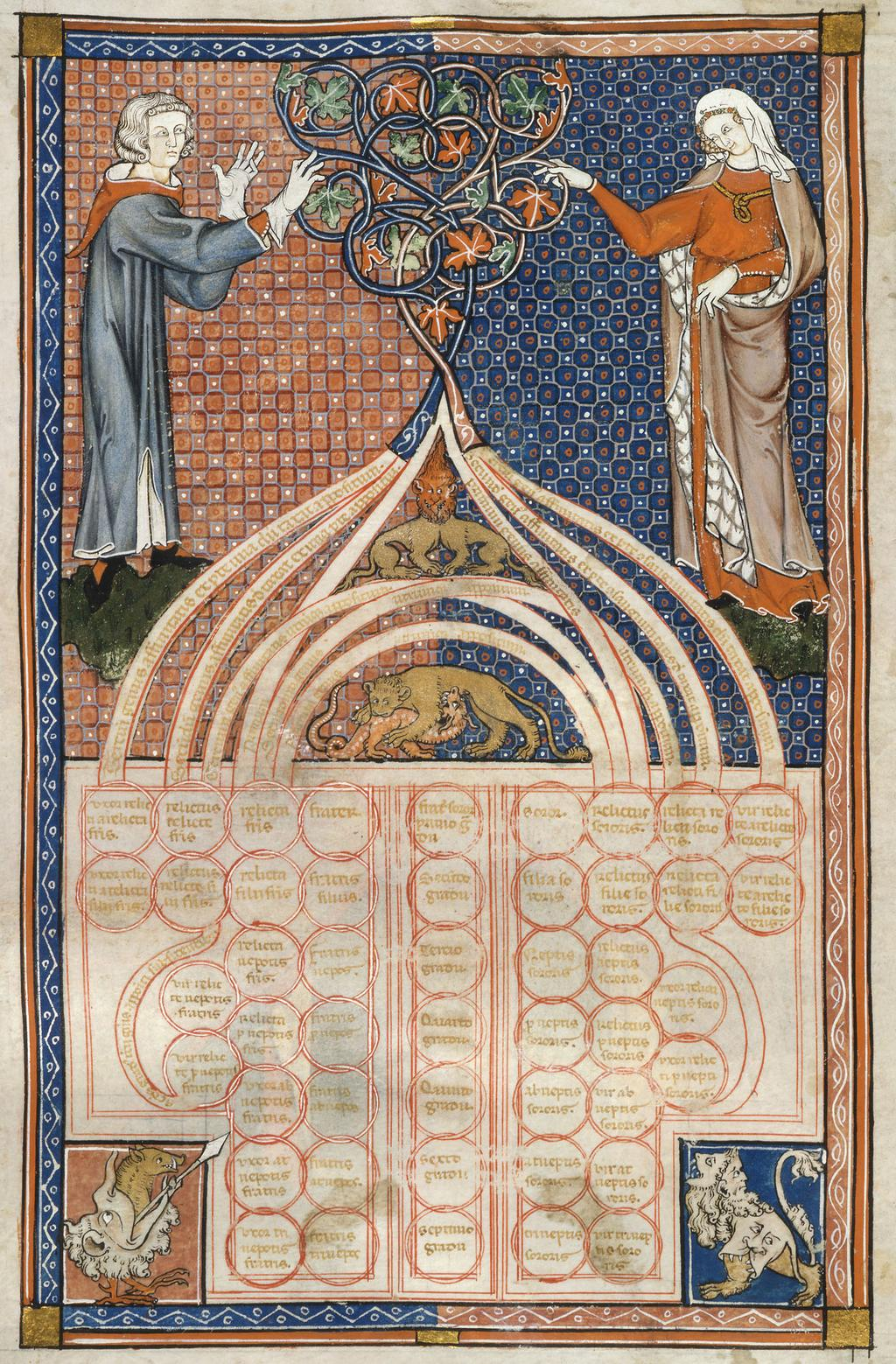
Page from a medieval manuscript of the Decretum Gratiani.

The Decretum Gratiani, also known as the Concordia discordantium canonum or Concordantia discordantium canonum or simply as the Decretum, is a collection of Catholic canon law compiled and written in the 12th century as a legal textbook by the jurist known as Gratian. It forms the first part of the collection of six legal texts, which together became known as the Corpus Juris Canonici.

The Decretum Gratiani was used as the main source of law by canonists of the Catholic Church until the Decretals, promulgated by Pope Gregory IX in 1234, obtained legal force, after which it was the cornerstone of the Corpus Juris Canonici, in force until 1917.

== Overview ==
Gratian, active in the first half of the 12th century, is believed to have been Bishop of Chiusi, probably a jurist of the ecclesiastical forum and a teacher, rubricator at the monastery of Saints Nabor and Felix (according to the thirteenth century Bolognese Odofredus Denariis) and a Camaldolese monk. Gratian composed the work he called Concordia discordantium canonum, and others titled Nova collectio, Decreta, Corpus juris canonici, more commonly known as the Decretum Gratiani. A living text, the work was characterized by multiple editorial stages. Gratian's aim was to obviate the difficulties which beset the study and the forensic application of practical, external theology (theologia practica externa), i.e., the study and the forensic use of canon law. In spite of its great reputation and wide diffusion, the Decretum has never been recognized by the Church as an official collection.

The so-called vulgata or vulgate version (an advanced editorial stage) of the Decretum is divided into three parts (ministeria, negotia, sacramenta).

- The first part is divided into 101 distinctions (distinctiones), the first 20 of which form an introduction to the general principles of canon law (tractatus decretalium); the remainder constitutes a tractatus ordinandorum, relative to ecclesiastical persons and function.
- The second part contains 36 causes (causæ), divided into questions (quæstiones), and treat of ecclesiastical administration, procedural issues and marriage. Quaestio 3 of Causa 33 on penance (De penitentia) is treated separately and subdivided into 7 distinctions.
- The third part De consecratione deals with sacramental and liturgical law and contains 5 distinctions.

Each distinction or question contains dicta Gratiani, or maxims of Gratian, and canones. Gratian himself raises questions and brings forward difficulties, which he answers by quoting auctoritates, i. e. canons of councils, decretals of the popes, texts of the Scripture or of the Fathers. These are the canones; the entire remaining portion, even the summaries of the canons and the chronological indications, are called the maxims or dicta Gratiani.

Many auctoritates have been inserted in the Decretum by authors of a later date. These are the Paleae, so called from Paucapalea, the name of the principal commentator on the Decretum. The Roman revisers of the 16th century (1566–1582) corrected the text of the "Decree" and added many critical notes designated by the words Correctores Romani.

=== Citing the Decretum ===
The Decretum is cited by referring to the larger units of the distinction or the cause and question, and then the specific canon or dictum. For clarity, the distinctions of Causa 33, quaestio 3 of the second part are referred to as De penitentia (or De pen.), while the distinctions of the third part are referred to as De consecratione (or De cons.). The Part is usually not included, as the citation form is different for each.

Citation styles for the Decretum have changed over time and can generally be categorised under the modern, obsolescent, and obsolete forms.

==== Modern form ====
This form, common since the twentieth century, cites all units in Arabic numerals, from largest unit to smallest unit.

Distinctions are referenced by an uppercase "D.", Causes by an uppercase "C.", questions by a lowercase "q.", and canons by a lowercase "c.". Gratian's dicta are referred to with a lowercase "d. a. c." (dictum ante canonem, for commentary preceding the canon) or "d. p. c." (dictum post canonem, for commentary following the canon).

Examples:

- [Part I] D. 23 c.7
- [Part II] C. 15 q. 2 c. 4
- [Part II] C. 23 q. 8 d. p. c. 25
- [Part II, De penitentia] D. 3 de pen. c. 24
- [Part III] D. 2 de cons. c. 82

==== Obsolescent form ====
Commonly used between the seventeenth and early twentieth centuries, this form generally begins with a reference to the smallest unit in Arabic numerals, followed by the Distinction or Cause in Roman numerals and (if required) the question in Arabic numerals, e.g. "c. 5, C.3 q.1".

==== Obsolete form ====
This is the form used by medieval and early modern writers, falling out of use after the eighteenth century. Major divisions (Distinctio, Causa, quaestio) were cited with (usually Roman) numerals. Since the numbering of the Decretum's capitula only became standard in the sixteenth century, canons were cited by their opening word(s). Two or more canons beginning with the same word/phrase might be distinguished with numbers, e.g. In Christo ii.

Examples (using the same references as above):

- xxiii dist. episcopus
- xv q. ii felix
- xxiii q. viii § hinc datur
- iii de pen[itentia] totam
- ii de cons. In Christo ii

Early commentators might also refer to the first few canons by number (e.g. cap. iij for the third canon of a distinction), or to the last few canons as cap. antepenult. ("capitulum antepenultimum", that is, third to last), cap. penult. (or pen. or pe., second to last), and cap. fin. ("capitulum finale") or cap. ult. (last).

== Author ==
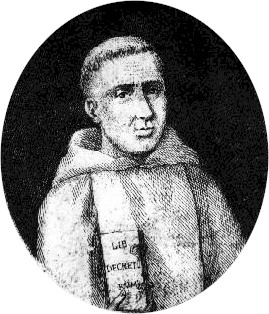
Gratian

Gratian (Medieval Latin: Gratianus) was a canon lawyer from Etruria, probably working in the former feudal state of Matilda of Tuscany (mainly in Tuscany and Emilia region) as well as in Reims (1131), Rome, Bologna, Venice (1143) and Chiusi. He flourished in the second quarter of the twelfth century. He died on 10 August around the middle of the 12th century as bishop of Chiusi in Tuscany. Little else is known about him.

He is sometimes incorrectly referred to as Franciscus Gratianus, Johannes Gratian, or Giovanni Graziano. For a long time he was believed to have been born around 1100, at Ficulle in Umbria, based on a chronicle of illustrious men of the 14th century attributed to an exponent of the powerful Colonna family, who had possessions in Ficulle. He was said to have become a monk at Camaldoli and then taught at the monastery of St. Felix in Bologna and devoted his life to studying theology and canon law, but contemporary scholars do not attach credibility to these traditions.

Since the 11th century, some cities of central-northern Italy such as Arezzo, Pisa, Bologna had been the centre of the study of Roman law, after the Corpus Juris Civilis was rediscovered in western Europe. In the second half of the 11th century and at the beginning of the 12th century Roman law was generally studied and applied only in the cities (seat of the diocese) in which there was an imperial Prefecture, where imperial and ecclesiastical jurists (and courts) coexisted (such as Pisa and Bologna), with mutual interference. However, from the first editorial stages of the Decretum it is clear that Gratian had little knowledge of Roman law and that he had a great sense of depth in the disputes dealt with in the ecclesiastical seats, especially in the appeal judgments dealt with in the Roman curia. Therefore, some scholars today exclude that he was trained in Justinian Roman law and that (at the beginning of his career) he worked mainly in certain cities (such as Arezzo, Pisa or Bologna) where Roman law was known and applied for years, it being plausible that he came from an episcopal city in which all jurisdiction, both civil and ecclesiastical, was dealt with by the only court present: the ecclesiastical one. Perhaps also for this reason he feels the need to create a legal work to be applied only in ecclesial courts and only for cases relating to canon law, putting an end to the mixture between civil and ecclesiastical jurisdictions. It is no coincidence that Dante Alighieri writes that he helped "one and the other forum", that is, he separated the canonical jurisdiction from the civil one. Gratian's work was an attempt, using early scholastic method, to reconcile seemingly contradictory canons from previous centuries. Gratian quoted a great number of authorities, including the Bible, papal and conciliar legislation, church fathers such as Augustine of Hippo, and secular law in his efforts to reconcile the canons. Gratian found a place in Dante's Paradise among the doctors of the Church:

This next flamelet issues from Gratian's smile, he who gave such help to the ecclesiastical and civil spheres as is acceptable in Paradise.

He has long been acclaimed as Pater Juris Canonici (Latin: "Father of Canon Law"), a title he shares with his successor St. Raymond of Penyafort. Gratian was the father and the first teacher of the scientia nova which he himself coined: the new canon law or ius novum. Many of his disciples have become highly renowned canonists.

== Textual history ==
The vulgate version of Gratian's collection was completed at some point after the Second Council of the Lateran of 1139, which it quotes. Research by Anders Winroth established that some manuscripts of an early version of Gratian's text, which differs considerably from the mainstream textual tradition, have survived.

As late as 1997, scholars commonly set the date of completion at 1140, but this accuracy in dating is not possible after Anders Winroth's groundbreaking scholarship. Winroth's research shows that the Decretum existed in two published recensions.

These differences led Winroth to conclude that Roman law was not as far developed by 1140 as scholars had previously thought. He has also argued that the second recension was due not to the original author of the first recension (whom he calls Gratian 1), but rather another jurist versed in Roman law. However, Winroth's thesis of two Gratians remains controversial.

This field of inquiry is hampered by ignorance of the compiler's identity and the existence of manuscripts with abbreviated versions of the text or variant versions not represented by Winroth's two recensions. One of these is the manuscript St. Gall, Stiftsbibliothek, 673 (=Sg), which some have argued contains the earliest known draft (Larrainzar's borrador) of the Decretum, but which other scholars have argued contains an abbreviation of the first recension expanded with texts taken from the second recension.

== Criticism ==
During the Reformation, individuals such as Martin Luther strongly criticized the claims of papal primacy within the Decretum. One of Luther's chief concerns surrounded Distinctio 40 (Chapter "Si papa") which reads:

If the pope fails, and neglects fraternal salvation, if he is found useless, and remiss in his works, and moreover silent from good, which offends him more, and nevertheless leads countless peoples with him as the first slave of hell, with himself to be scourged with many plagues for eternity. No mortal may presume to rebuke the sins of this man, because he himself is to judge all.

Additional concerns about papal primacy in the context of 2 Thessalonians 2:4 were raised regarding Distinctio 96 chapter 7 which reads:

It is quite clearly shown that the pontiff cannot be bound by the secular power, which is evidently called a god by the pious prince Constantine, since it is clear that even God cannot be judged by men.

== Sources ==
Gratian's sources were Roman law, the Bible, the writings of (or attributed to) the Church Fathers, papal decretals, the acts of church councils and synods. In most cases, Gratian obtained the material not from a direct reading of the sources but rather through intermediate collections. Thanks to the research of modern scholars (in particular Charles Munier, Titus Lenherr, and Peter Landau) it is now known that Gratian made use of a relatively-small number of collections in the composition of most of the Decretum:

- Anselm (II) of Lucca's canonical collection, originally compiled around 1083 and existing in four main recensions: A, B, Bb, and C. Peter Landau suggests that Gratian probably employed a manuscript containing an expanded form of recension A which he calls recension A';
- the Collectio tripartita attributed to Ivo of Chartres, usually thought to date to 1095;
- the Panormia of Ivo of Chartres, also usually dated to 1095, although several scholars have argued for a later date and some even question Ivo's authorship;
- Gregory of St. Grisogono's Polycarpus, completed some time after 1111;
- the Collectio canonum trium librorum (Collection in Three Books), inspired by the doctrines of Paschal II and the reform of the Church, composed in Italy (probably in Pistoia, Tuscany, by an anonymous Roman canonist) between 1111 and 1123 or 1124;
- the Lex Romana Visigothorum;
- secular texts such as Plato;
- the Glossa ordinaria to the Bible.

Other sources are known to have been used in the composition of particular sections of the Decretum:

- Isidore of Seville's Etymologies for DD. 1-9 (the so-called Treatise on Laws);
- Alger of Liège's Liber de misericordia et iustitia for C. 1;
- the Sententiae magistri A. for the De penitentia and some other sections.

== Influence ==
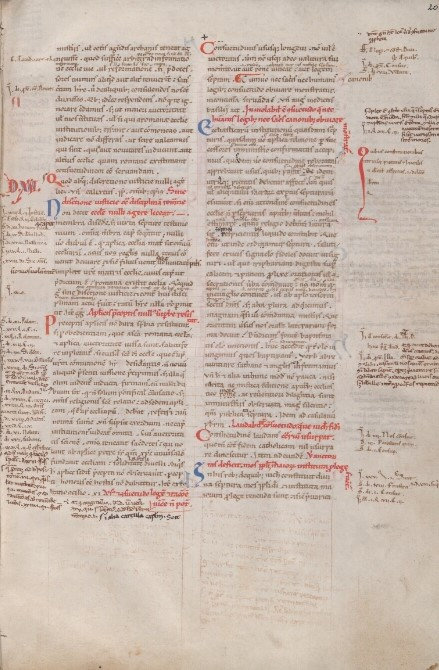
Thirteenth-century modest copy of the famous manuscript Decretum Gratiani. Preserved in the Ghent University Library in Ghent, Belgium.

Gratian himself named his work Concordia Discordantium Canonum – "Concord of Discordant Canons". The name is fitting: Gratian tried to harmonize apparently contradictory canons with each other, by discussing different interpretations and deciding on a solution, as a judge in a case. This dialectical approach allowed for other law professors to work with the Decretum and to develop their own solutions and commentaries. These legists are known as the decretists.

... the Concordance of Discordant Canons or Decretum served the function of giving the canonists a text like that of the Corpus Iuris Civilis for the civilians or the bible for the theologians.

These commentaries were called glosses. Editions printed in the 15th, 16th or 17th century frequently included the glosses along with the text. Collections of glosses were called "gloss apparatus" or Lectura in Decretum (see also glossator). Systematic commentaries were called Summae. Some of these Summae were soon in circulation as well and obtained the same level of fame as the Decretum itself. Early commentators included Paucapalea and Magister Rolandus. The most important commentators were probably Rufin of Bologna (died before 1192) and Huguccio (died 1210). Less well-known was the commentary of Simon of Bisignano, which consisted of the Glosses on the Decretum and the Summa Simonis.

Peter Lombard borrowed and adapted from the Decretum when discussing penance in his Sentences (c. 1150).

=== Importance in Western law ===
Because of its influence as a source of canon law, the Decretum served as an influence for 12th-century jurists in the development of Western legal systems and their rules of evidence, which in canon law (including in the Decretum) did not include trial by ordeal and by battle.

The author Thomas Woods called the Decretum "the first comprehensive and systematic legal treatise in the history of the West, and perhaps in the history of mankind – if by 'comprehensive' is meant the attempt to embrace virtually the entire law of a given polity, and if by 'systematic' is meant the express effort to codify that law as a single body, in which all parts are viewed as interacting to form a whole." The Decretum made a direct contribution to the development of Western law in areas that it dealt with such as marriage, property and inheritance. Specific concepts preferred included consent for marriage, and wrongful intent in determining whether a certain act constituted a crime. The Corpus Juris Civilis and Digesta were 'comprehensive' and preceded it, and so did the 'systematic' Institutes but covered only 'private law'.

== See also ==
- Margaritae
