= History of Tyre, Lebanon =

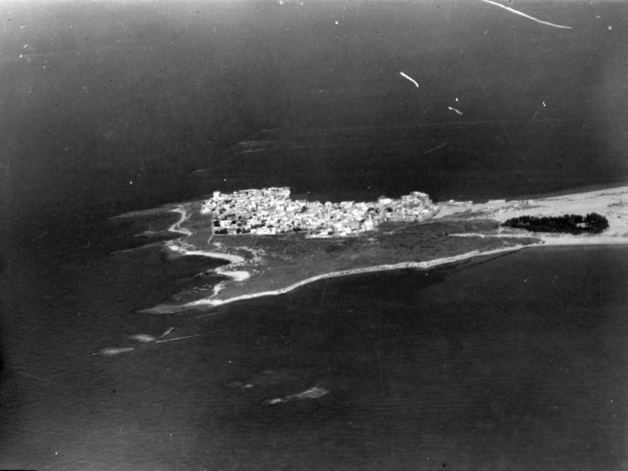
Aerial photo of Tyre, c. 1918

Tyre, in Lebanon, is one of the oldest cities in the world, having been continuously inhabited for over 4,700 years. Situated in the Levant on the coast of the Mediterranean Sea, Tyre became the leading city of the Phoenician civilization in 969 BC with the reign of the Tyrian king Hiram I. Tyre and Phoenicia are also credited with numerous innovations in shipbuilding, navigation, industry, agriculture, and government. Tyre's international trade network was based on its two ports (Note: The "Sidonian port" to the north, still partly existing today, and the "Egyptian port" to the south which has perhaps been discovered very recently, with a new hypothesis about the local relative sea level rise and a major discovery of the Phoenician breakwater of the southern, so-called "Egyptian", harbour.) and is believed to have fostered the economic, political, and cultural foundations of Classical Western civilization.

During the early Middle Ages, the city experienced a long period of decline. Its population suffered during the 6th century from the political chaos that ensued when the Eastern Roman empire was torn apart by wars. The decline was compounded by numerous earthquakes that destroyed the city. Tyre then enjoyed a period of prosperity under the Muslims and then the crusaders. In 1291 AD the Mamluks seized the city from the Crusaders. The resulting mass depopulation event started a period of decline for the city that lasted until roughly 1750 AD. Local ruler sheikh Nasif al-Nassar initiated a number of construction projects, which drove a short-lived revival of the city. The city experienced another boom in the 19th century with the start of several new commercial and building projects. Numerous wars in the region beset the city until the independence of the French Mandate of Lebanon in 1943.

== Founding millennium (2750–1700 BC) ==
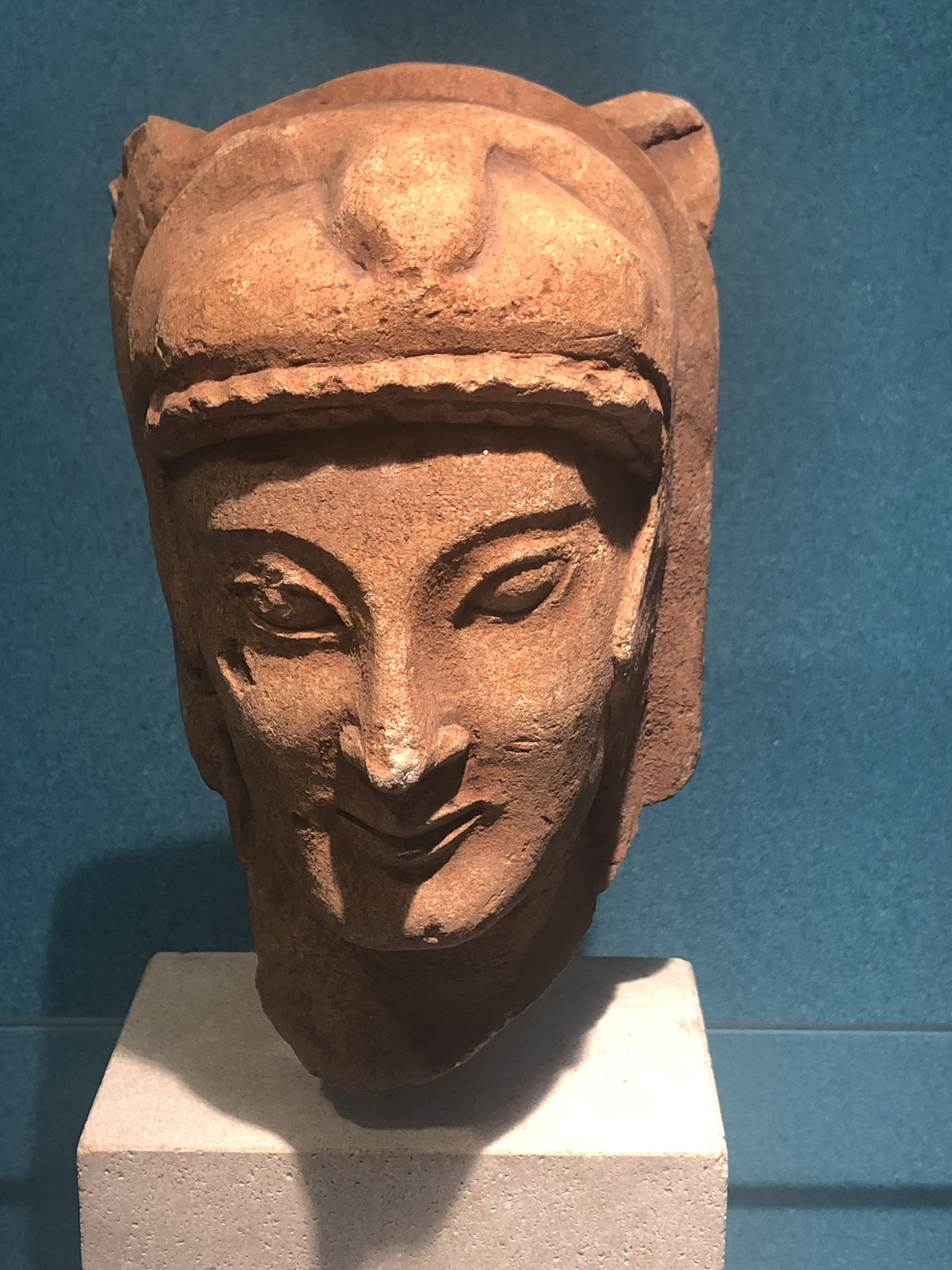
Bust of Melqart at the National Museum of Denmark

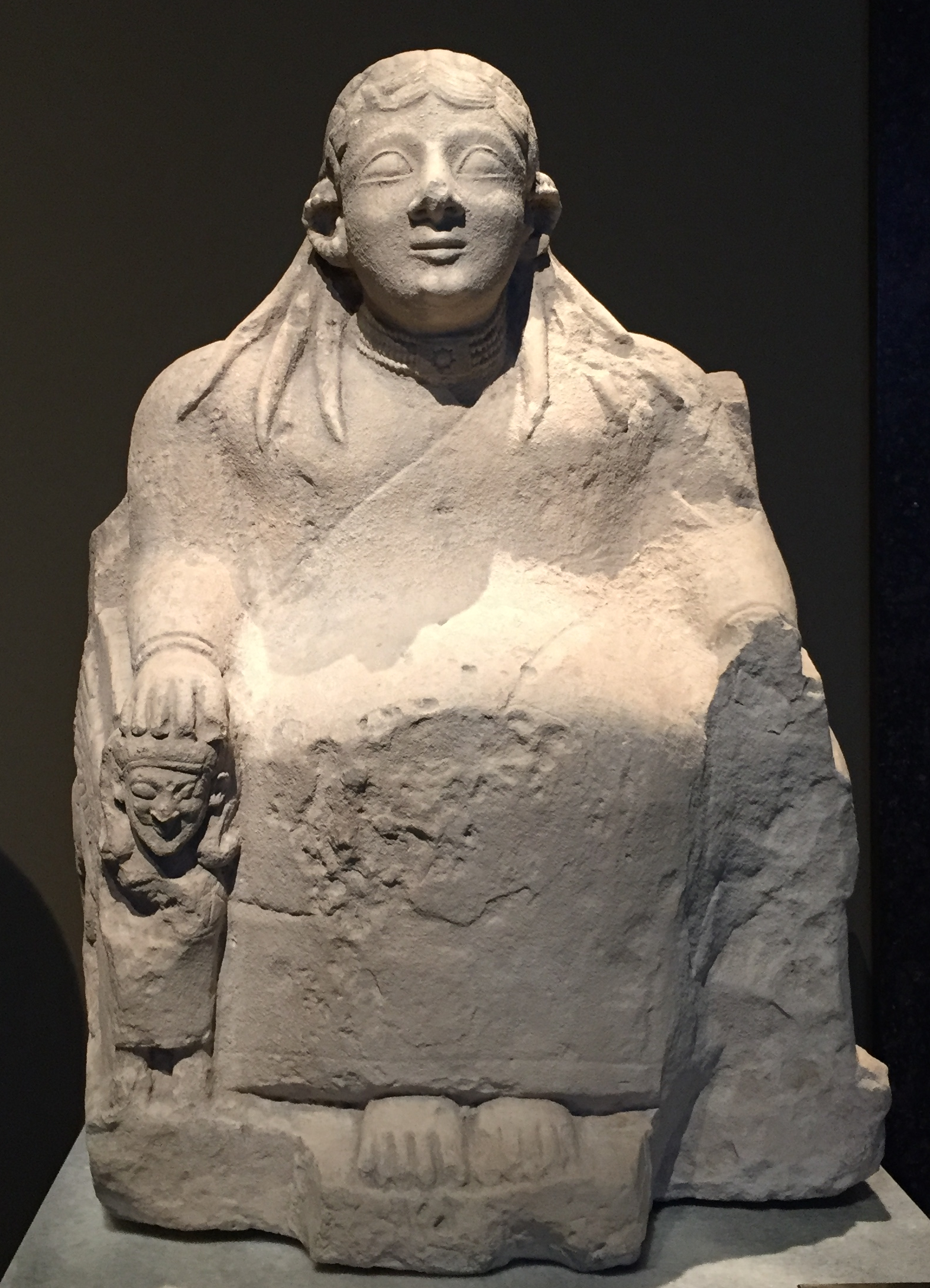
Limestone figurine on a throne from Cyprus, 6th century BC, "probably" representing Astarte, on display at Kunsthistorisches Museum in Vienna

The Roman historian Justin wrote that the original founders arrived from the nearby Northern city of Sidon in the quest to establish a new harbour. Doric Greek historian Herodotus visited Tyre around 450 BC at the end of the Greco-Persian Wars (499–449 BC), and wrote in his Histories that according to the priests there, the city was founded around 2750 BC, as a walled place upon the mainland, now known as Paleotyre (Old Tyre). Archaeological evidence has corroborated this timing. Excavations have also found that there had already been some settlements around 2900 BC, but that they were abandoned.

The Greek historian Eusebius recorded the common myth that the deity Melqart built the city as a favour to the mermaid Tyros and named it after her. However, there are two other main founding legends. According to the first one, there were two brothers in primeval times – Usoos and Shamenrum – living on the seashore who separated after a fight. Usoos took a tree trunk and was the first to sail in it on the sea. He landed on an island and consecrated two columns there, one to fire and the other to the wind, thus founding Tyre which was called Ushu in Egypt and Mesopotomia. The second legend explains why Astarte as the goddess of fertility was worshipped in Tyre as well:

Originally the island was not attached to the sea floor, but rose and fell with the waves. An Olive tree of the goddess Ashtart rose there, protected by a curtain of Flames. A snake was wrapped around its trunk and an eagle was perched in it. It was predicted that the island would cease floating when the bird was sacrificed to the gods. The god Melqart taught people how to build boats, then sailed to the island. The eagle offered itself, and Sur became attached to the sea floor. Since then, the gods have never stopped living there...

The first known textual reference to Tyre comes from a curse text dated to the 19th century BC. In general, the first half of the second millennium BC in the Eastern Mediterranean was "a time of peaceful trade and Tyre probably shared in the commercial activity."

== Egyptian period (1700–1200 BC) ==
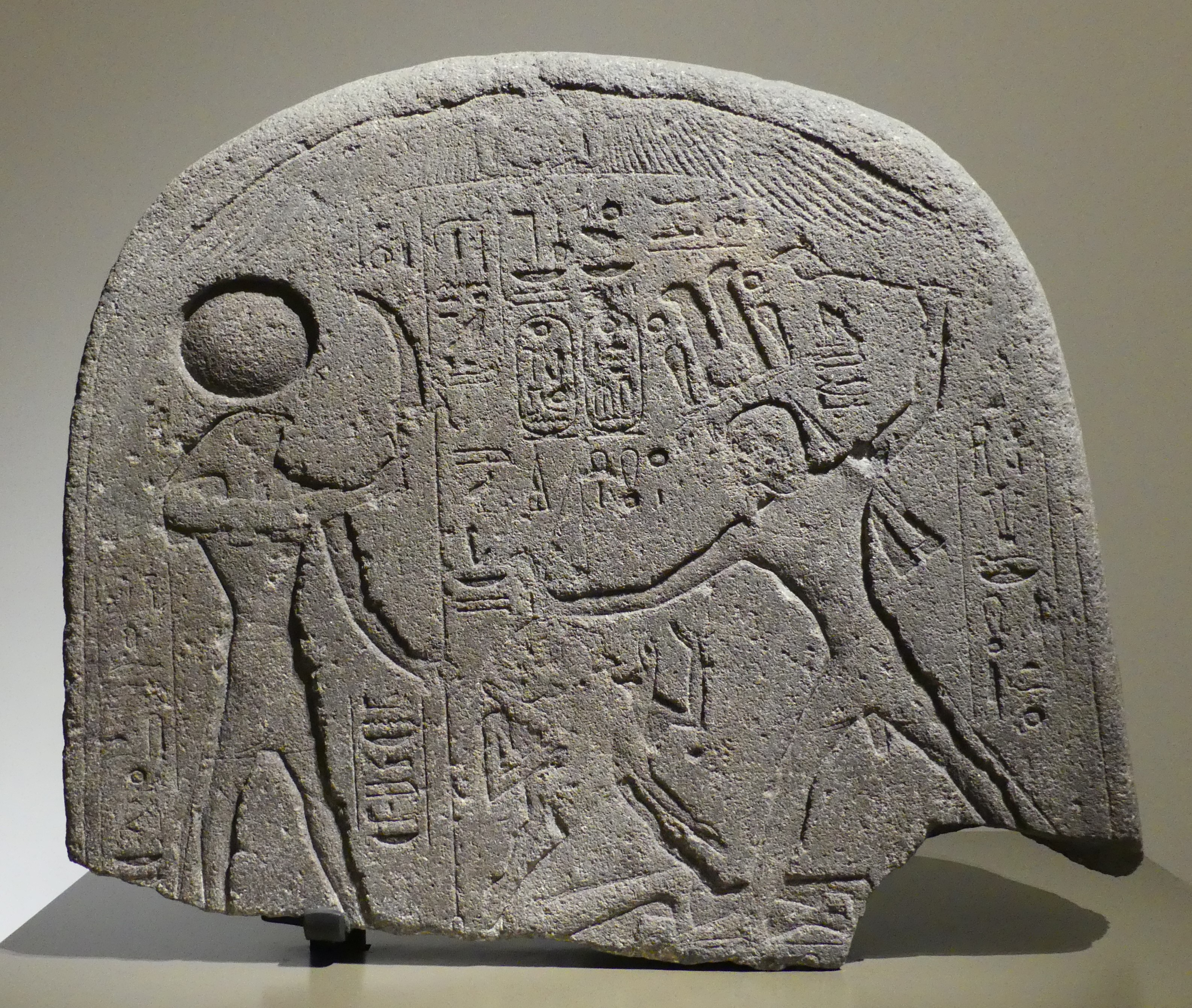
Basalt stele of Ramesses II found in Tyre, on display at the National Museum of Beirut

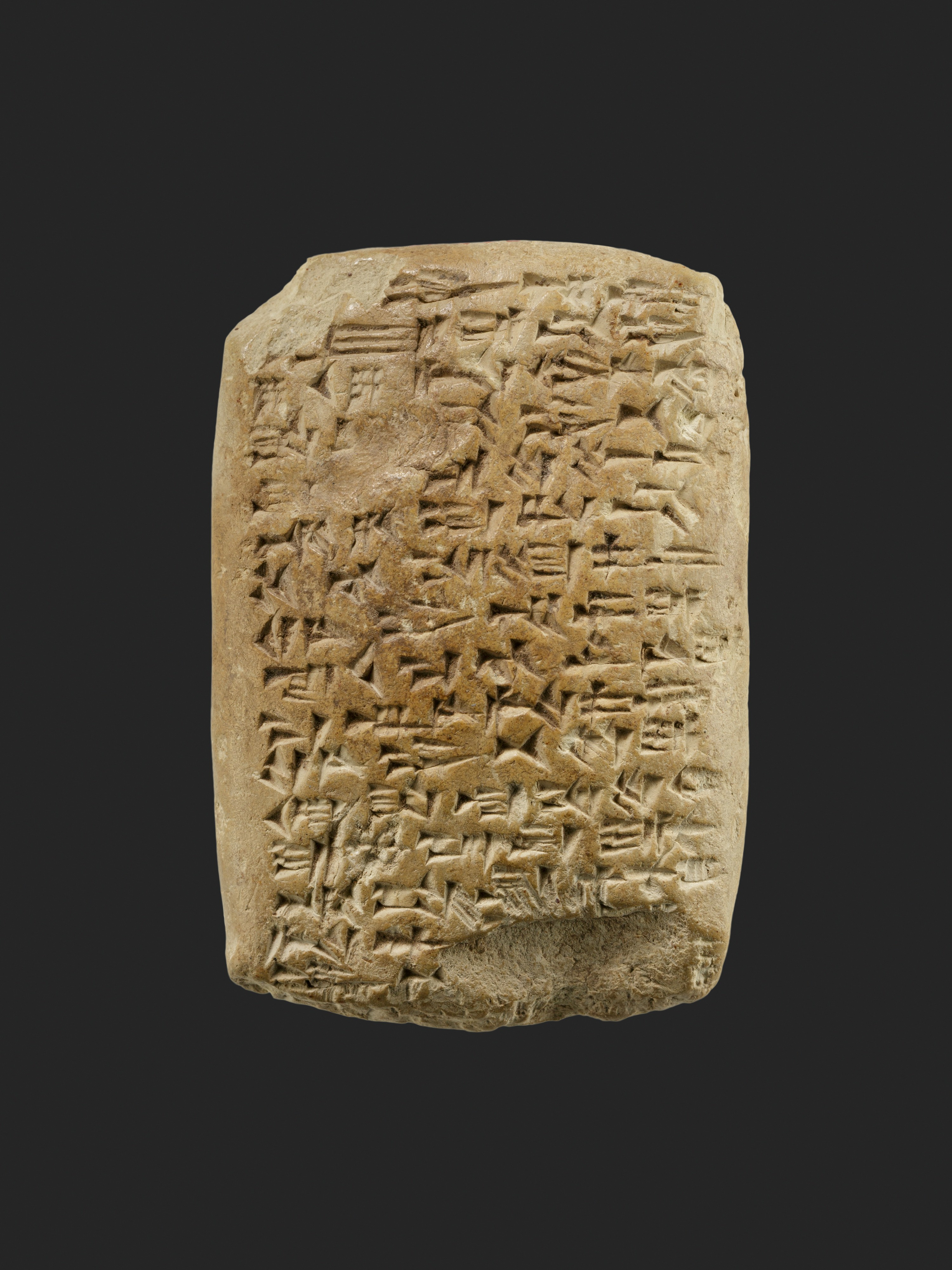
Amarna clay letter from Tyrian prince Abimilku to Pharaoh Akenaten, Metropolitan Museum of Art

In the 17th century BC, the settlement came under the supremacy of the Egyptian pharaohs. In the subsequent years it started benefitting from the protection by Egypt's Eighteenth Dynasty and prospered commercially. Archaeological evidence indicates that Tyre had already by the middle of the second millennium BCE established the industrial production of a rare and extraordinarily expensive purple dye, known as Tyrian Purple, which was famous for its beauty and lightfast qualities. It was exploited from the Murex trunculus and Murex brandaris shellfishes. According to mythology, deity Melqart was walking on the beach with the nymph Tyros, whom he courted, when his dog bit a mollusc and the sea snail's blood stained its mouth purple. Tyros desired from Melqart a dyed dress of the same colour and thus the manufacture was born.

The colour was, in ancient cultures, reserved for the use of royalty or at least the nobility. Experts have calculated that some 8,000 Murex had to be crushed to extract one gram of the dye, which may have cost the equivalent of about twenty grams of gold. However, the ancient author Strabo, who visited Tyre himself, recorded that the dye industry polluted the air so much that its stench made his stay in the city very unpleasant.

The first clear accounts of the city are given by the ten Amarna letters dated 1350 BC from the Prince of Tyre, Abimilku, written to Akenaten. The subject is often water, wood, and the Habiru overtaking the countryside of the mainland and how that affected the island-city. Eventually, Egyptian forces defeated a Hittite army that besieged Tyre.

While the city was originally called Melqart after the city-god, the name Tyre appears on monuments as early as 1300 BC. Philo of Byblos (in Eusebius) quotes the antiquarian authority Sanchuniathon as stating that it was first occupied by Hypsuranius. Sanchuniathon's work is said to be dedicated to "Abibalus king of Berytus" – possibly the Abibaal, who became the Phoenician king of Tyre towards the end of the 2nd-millennium BC.

According to some sources, Tyrians said sailors ventured to the British Isles and purchased tin there to produce bronze for arms and artefacts as early as in the 13th century BC.

In the 12th century BC, Egypt's pharaohs gradually lost political control over the Levant, though Egyptian art continued to influence Tyrian art for more than half a millennium.

== Independent Phoenician period (1200–868 BC) ==
Terracotta figurines from Tyre, Iron Age II, at the National Museum of Beirut

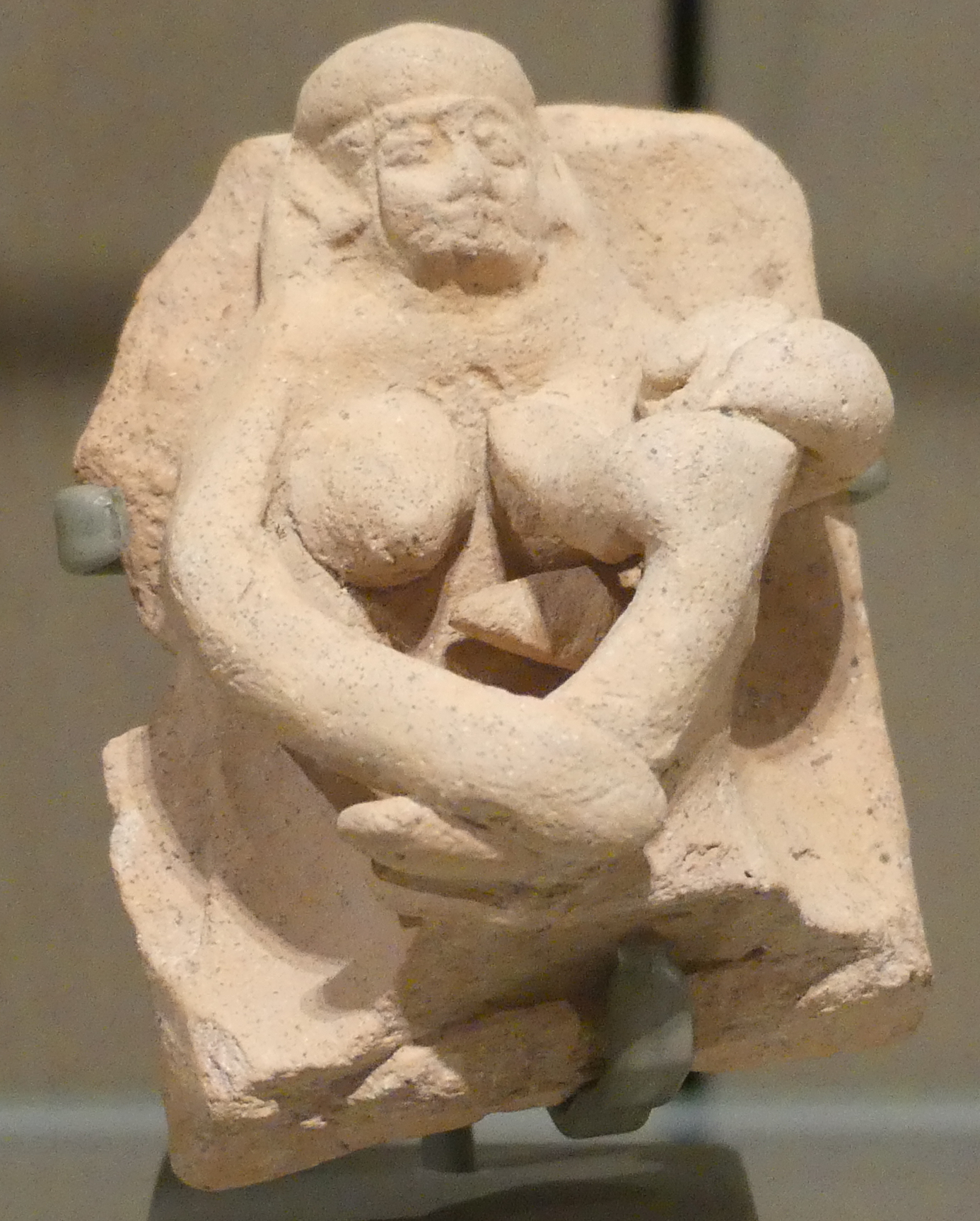
A woman breastfeeding a baby

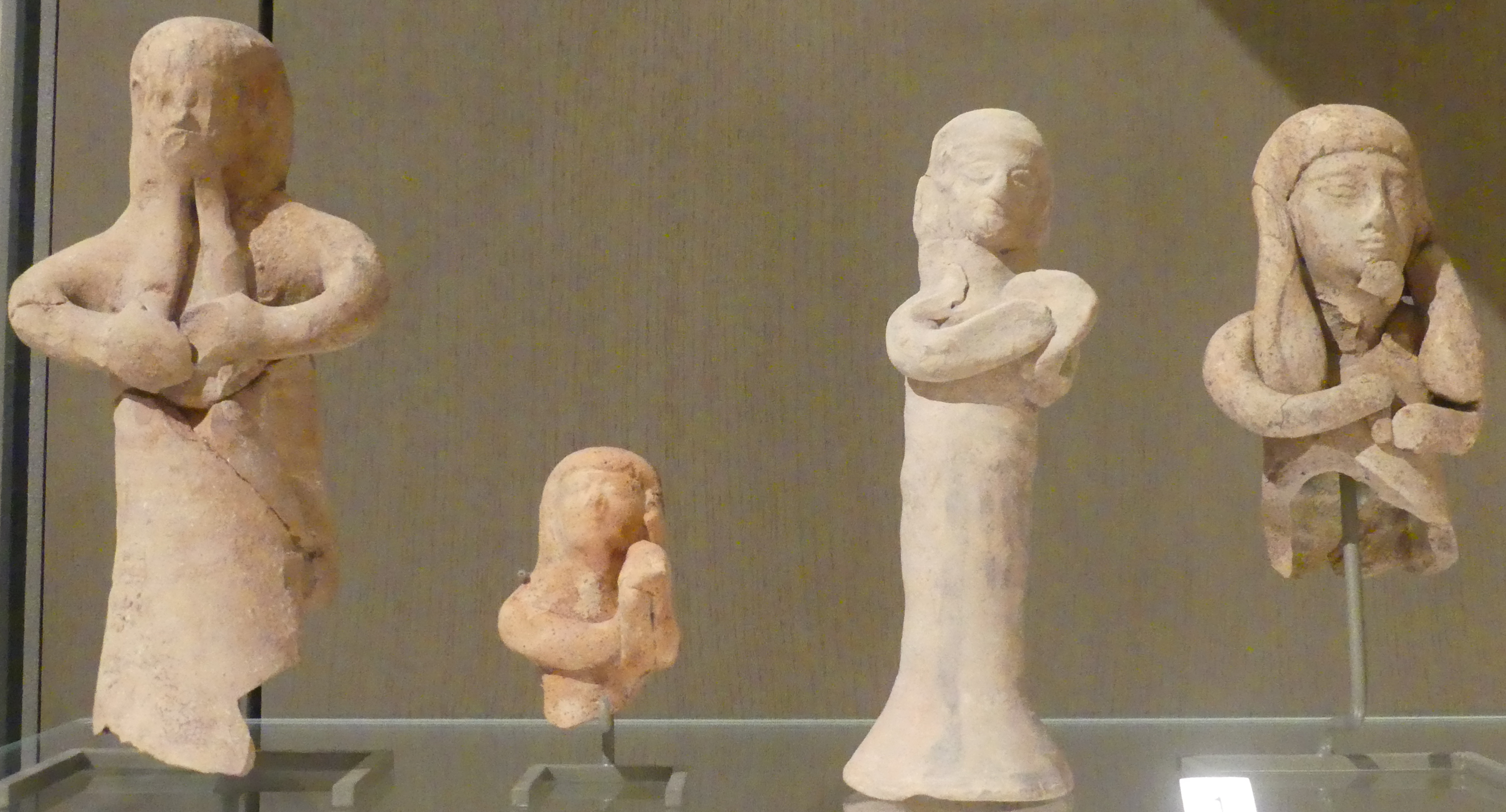
Musicians

During the 11th century BC the collection of maritime merchant-republic city-states constituting Phoenicia began a commercial expansion. Especially Tyre and Sidon benefited from the elimination of the former trade centers in Ugarit and Alalakh. Hence, Phoenicia came to be characterized by outsiders and the Phoenicians as Sidonia or Tyria. Phoenicians and other Canaanites alike were called Sidonians or Tyrians. Yet, such was Tyre's maritime dominance that the Mediterranean Sea became known as the Tyrian Sea.

There is very little archaeological data from Tyre during this period of Iron Age II and thus it is not known how it imposed its hegemony on others. However, it is widely assumed that it relied on trade as well as cultural exchange, rather than on military conquest. Most prominently, Tyre has been credited for spreading its alphabet and a vigesimal numerical system.

A decisive factor in this global rise were apparently the extraordinary skills by Tyrian scholars in astronomy to navigate their ships. As the space on the island city was limited, the inhabitants constructed multi-storey buildings. They thus acquired a reputation for being great masons and engineers, also in metalworks and especially in shipbuilding.

Written tradition has largely credited one individual with the strong growth of Tyre's prosperity from the 10th century BC onwards: Hiram I, who succeeded his father Abibaal in 969 BC. More than a millennium later, Flavius Josephus recorded the legend that Hiram expanded the urban territory by projects connecting two islands or Reefs to form a single island on which he had temples erected for Melqart, Astarte, and Ba'al Shamem.

Hiram I of Tyre established Tyre's naval supremacy, monopolizing sea transport and exerting control over the Phoenician coastline, including rival cities like Byblos and Sidon. Hiram evidently forged close relations with the Hebrew kings David and Solomon. Reportedly, he sent cedar wood and skilled workers for the construction of the Temple in Jerusalem. In exchange, Israel provided Tyre with silver, agricultural goods, and access to trade routes in Syria, Mesopotamia, and Arabia's interior. As per biblical accounts, Hiram and Solomon jointly planned a Red Sea commercial venture. Phoenician-manned ships were scheduled to annually sail from Ezion-Geber near Elath to Ophir on the Red Sea coast—possibly present-day Sudan or Somalia—to acquire gold, silver, ivory, and precious stones. Imports from Cyprus played an important part in this period.

Furthermore, Hiram's regional cooperation as well as his fight against Philistine pirates helped to develop trade with Arabia, and North and East Africa. Commerce from throughout the ancient world was gathered into the warehouses of Tyre, as its fortifications offered protection for valuable goods in storage or transit. And Tyrians not only settled in Memphis, south of the temple of Hephaestus in a district called the Tyrian Camp. They also founded colonies on the coasts and neighbouring islands of the Aegean Sea, in Greece, on the northern coast of Africa, at Carthage and other places, in Sicily and Corsica, in Spain at Tartessus and even beyond the pillars of Hercules at Gadeira (Cádiz). However, after Hiram's reign of 34 years, several Tyrian kings were killed in succession fights:

== Neo-Assyrian period (868–612 BC) ==
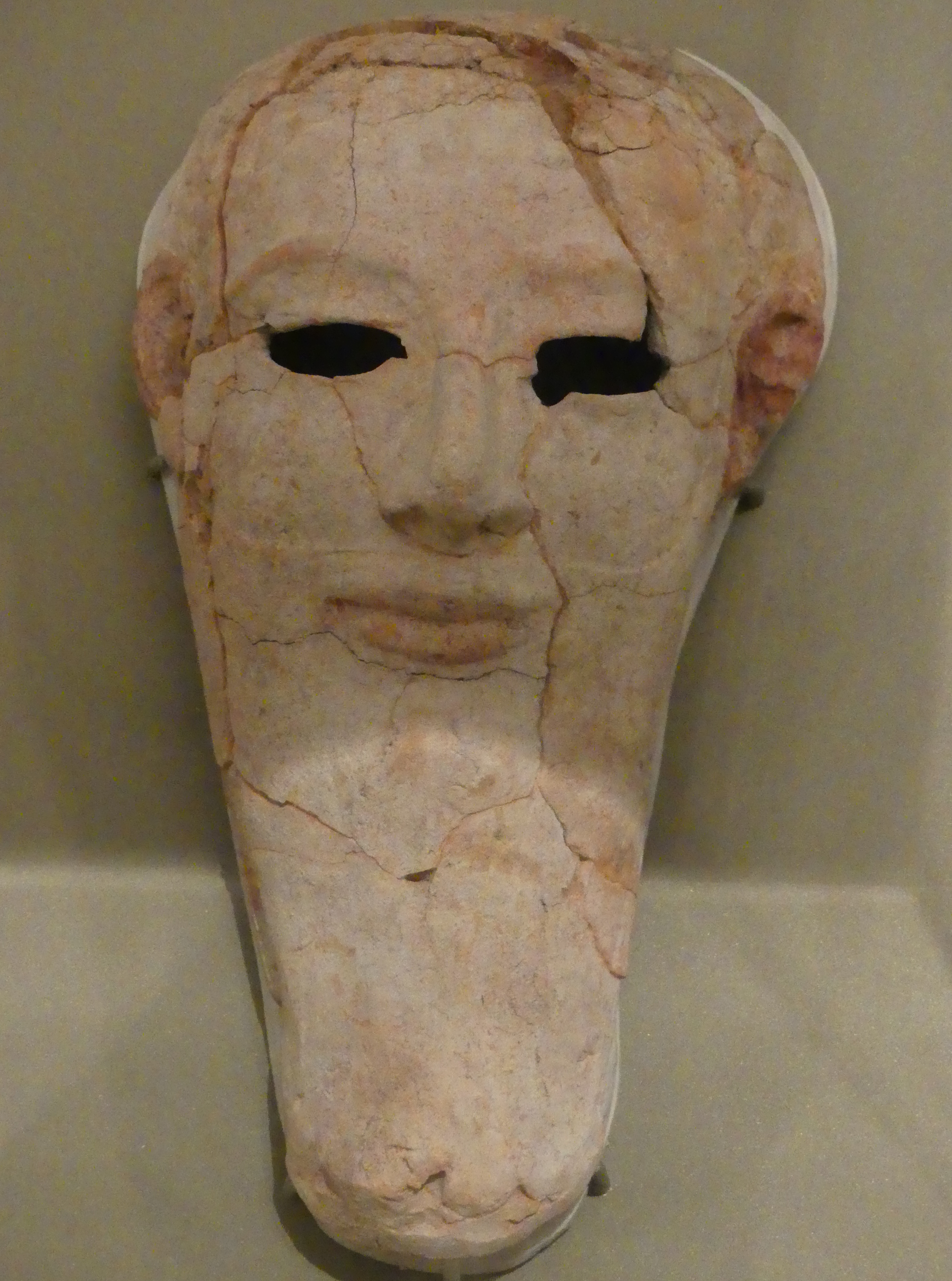
Funerary mask from Tyre, 7th c. BC, National Museum of Beirut

In the course of the 9th century BC, the city remained close to the Israelites, as evident through the marriage of Jezebel from a royal Tyrian family with Ahab, King of Israel.

However, Tyre started paying tribute to the Neo-Assyrians who gradually established sovereignty over Phoenicia. It seems though that Tyre only made a nominal subjection and kept a large degree of independence while benefiting in its commerce from the stability of strong regional power. Thus, Tyre itself remained one of the more powerful cities in the Eastern Mediterranean. One of its kings, the priest Ithobaal I (887–856 BC), ruled as far north as Beirut, and part of Cyprus.

According to the myth, the Northern African city of Carthage (Qart-Hadašt = "New City") was founded in 814 BC by Tyre's Princess Elissa, commonly known as Dido, who escaped after a power struggle with her brother Pygmalion with a fleet of ships. Legend has it that she purchased a large piece of land from the local Numid ruler, who granted her the size of land that an oxhide could cover, by having it cut into thin threads. The ancient historians Josephus and Justin give elaborate accounts that a political conflict between the king and the priestly class was at the core of the break-up.

In the course of the 8th century BC, the Assyrian kings attempted to increase their sovereignty over Tyre. Tiglath-Pileser III (744–727 BC) demanded tribute from Hiram II and tried to prohibit trade between Tyre and settlements to the South. His successor Shalmaneser V besieged the city with support from Phoenicians of the mainland from around 725 to 720 BC, but was not able to take it. Cyprus – on the other hand – liberated itself from Tyrian domination in 709 BC.

Sennacherib, who ruled the Neo-Assyrian kingdom from 705 to 681 BC, failed to conquer Tyre in his military campaigns, but Tyrian king Luli lost control over the territories outside the city and was forced to flee. He was succeeded by pro-Assyrian monarchs and governors. Tyrian king Balu – or Baal I – reportedly assisted the Neo-Assyrian ruler Esarhaddon (680–669 BC) in suppressing a Sidonian revolt and as an award gained control over much of the coast of Palestine. Yet, Balu apparently entered an alliance with Egyptian pharaoh Taharqa and was punished by Esarhaddon.

Asurbanipal, Esarhaddon's successor from 669 to 631, reportedly destroyed the hinterland of Tyre, but because of its economic potential preserved the once again rebellious city which reactivated its trade and continued to prosper.

As the Neo-Assyrian empire crumbled during the 7th century BC, Tyre and the other Phoenician city-states not only enjoyed considerable independence but also booming trade activities.

== Independent and Neo-Babylonian period (612–539 BC) ==
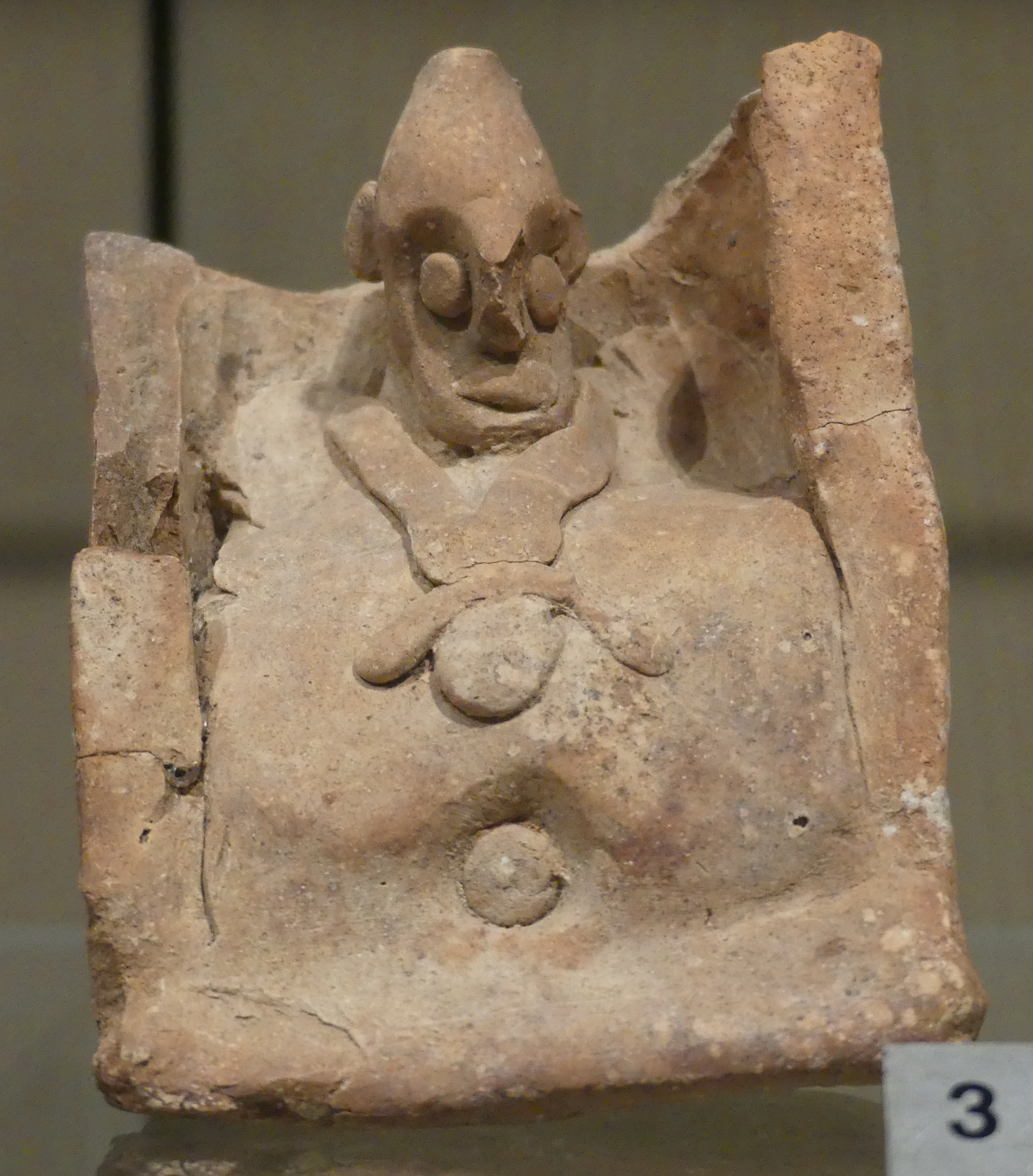
Figurine of a deity from Tyre, 7th century BC, National Museum

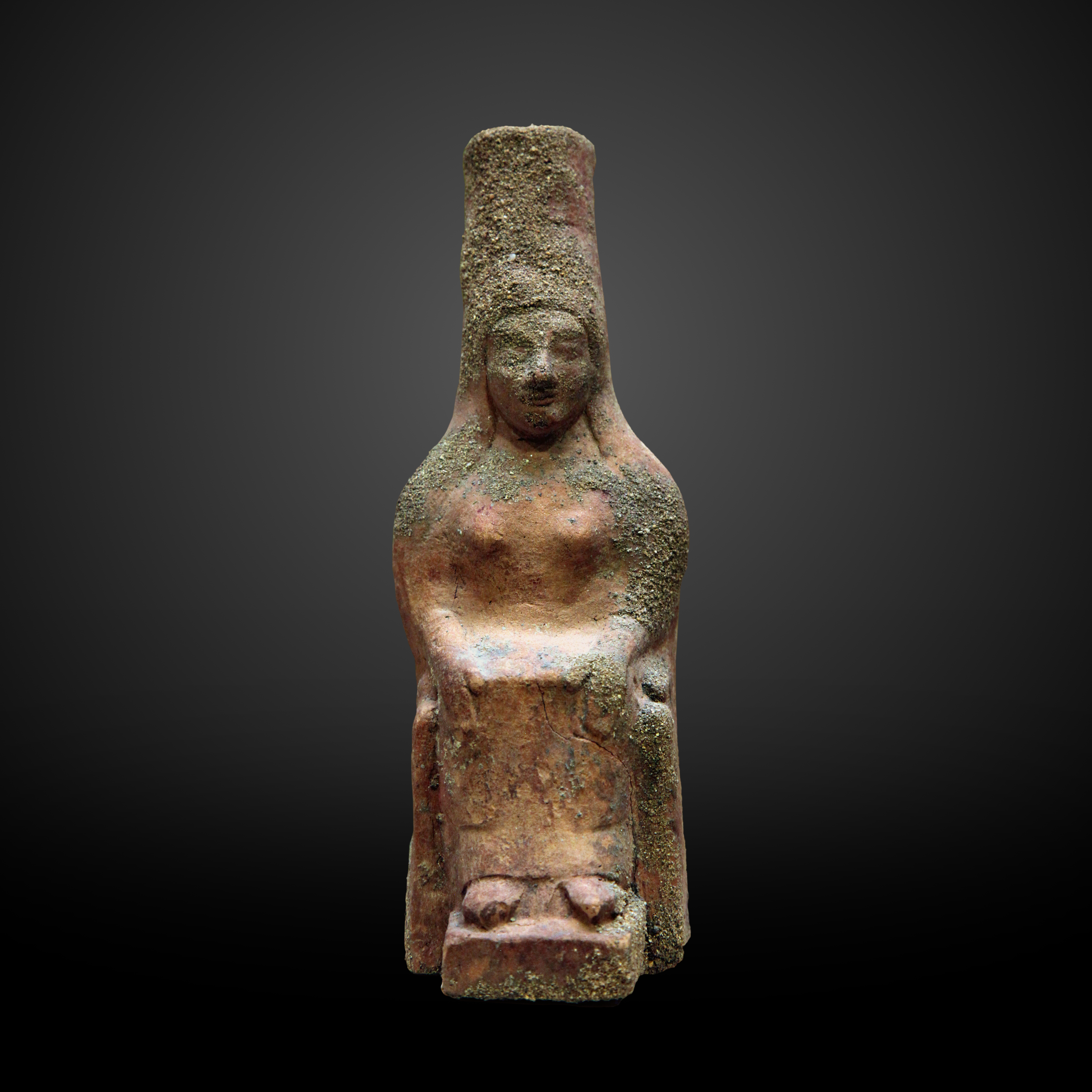
Terracotta statuette of a seated woman with tiara, from Tyre, 6th century BC, at the Louvre

After the fall of the Assyrians in 612 BC, Tyre and the other Phoenician city-states at first enjoyed another boom of its commerce without the burden of paying tributes. However, this period ended after a few years when Nebuchadnezzar II in 605 BC started military campaigns in the Levant. The Tyrian rulers allied themselves with Egypt, the kingdoms of Judah, Edom, and Moab as well as other Phoenician cities against the Neo-Babylonian ambitions for regional expansion. They succeeded in keeping their independence.

In 586 BC, Nebuchadnezzar II started a siege of Tyre that went on for thirteen years. It failed, but the weakened city eventually conceded to pay a tribute. Due to the long siege, Tyre had suffered economically, as its commercial activities were greatly damaged by the instability. Numismatic sources suggest that as a consequence Tyre lost grounds in its traditional rivalry with neighbouring Sidon. At the same time, the influence of Egyptian art finally diminished.

== Persian period (539–332 BC) ==
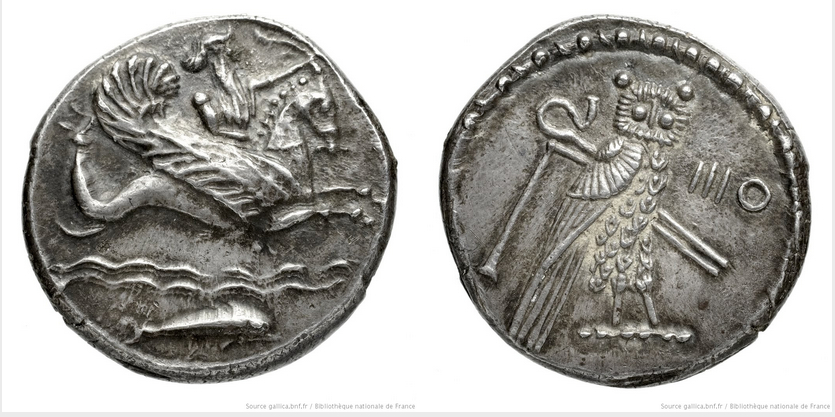
Silver coin of Tyre minted in Acre, dated 347–346 BC, on the left Melqart riding on a maritime horse and on the right an owl with an Egyptian scepter

The Achaemenid Empire of the Persian king Cyrus the Great conquered the city in 539 BC. The Persians divided Phoenicia into four vassal kingdoms: Sidon, Tyre, Arwad, and Byblos. They prospered, furnishing fleets for Persian kings. However, when Cambyses II organised a war campaign against Carthage, Tyre refused to sail against its daughter city.

Under Persian sovereignty, Tyre – like the other Phoenician city-states – was at first allowed to keep its own kings, but eventually the old system of royal families was abolished. Tyre's economy continued to rely largely on the production of purple dye from Murex shellfish, which appeared on a silver coin of Tyre around 450–400 BC, when the city started minting its own currency. Other motifs on coins included dolphins. Herodotus visited Tyre around 450 BC and found the temple of Melqart.

According to Roman historian Justin, an insurrection of slaves took place during the Persian period, which spared only the life of one slave-master named Straton – who was then selected by the former slaves to be the new king and established a dynasty. In 392 BC Evagoras, the Prince of Cyprus, started a revolt against the Persian rule with Athenian and Egyptian support. His forces took Tyre by assault – or by secret consent of the Tyrians. However, after ten years he terminated the rebellion and Tyre once again came under Persian control. It abstained from Sidon's insurgency in 352 BC and profited commercially from the destruction of the neighbouring city.

== Hellenistic period (332–126 BC) ==
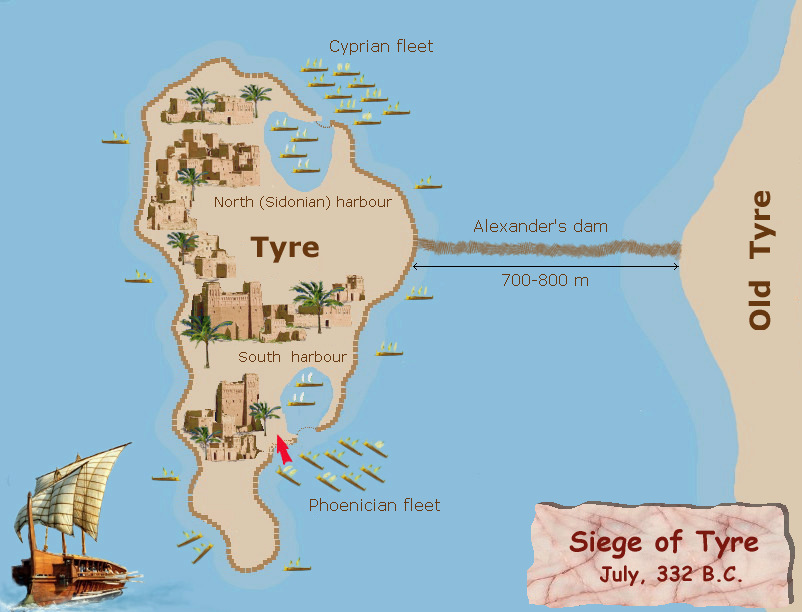
Alexander's siege of Tyre

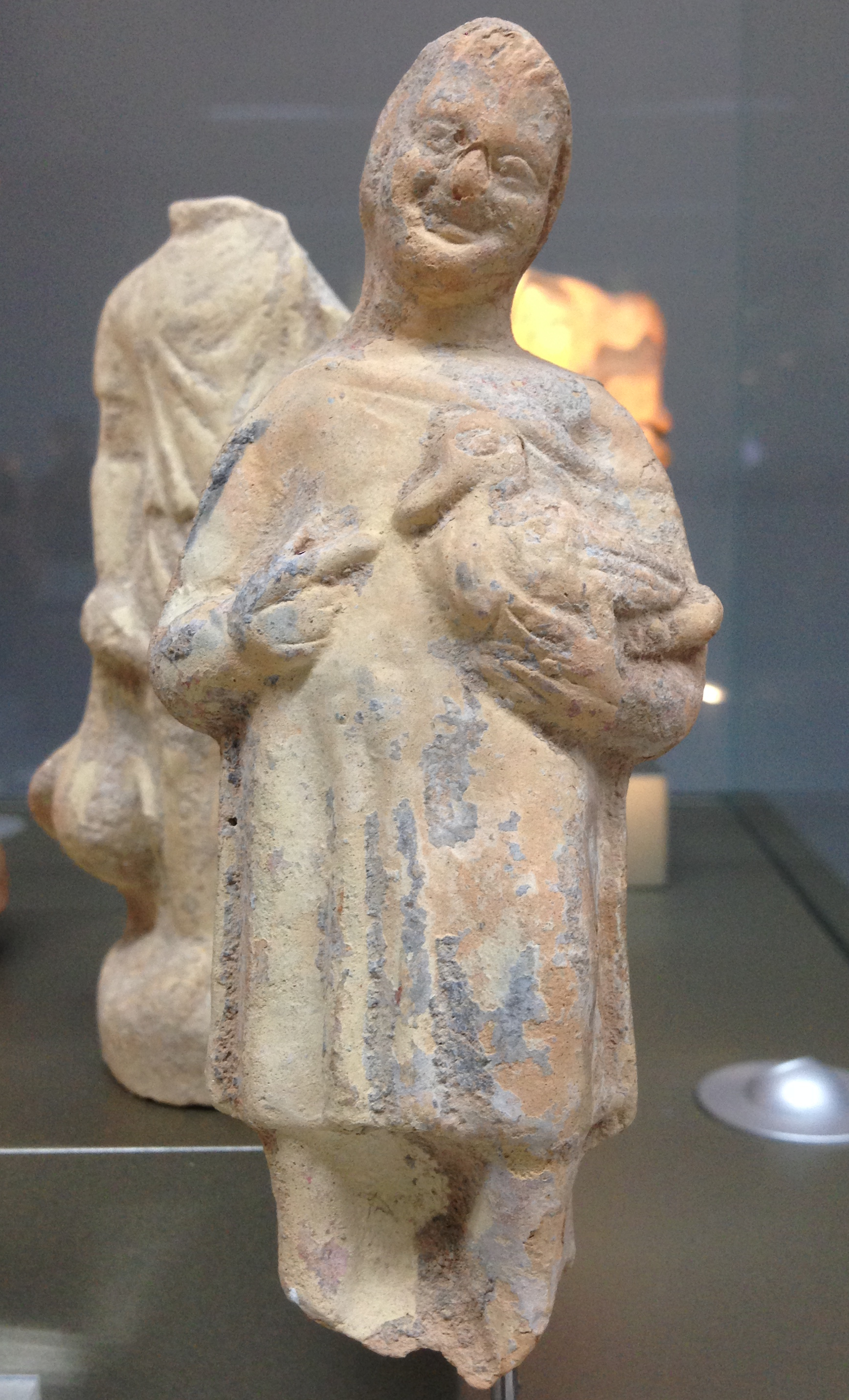
Hellenistic figurine from Tyre, National Museum of Beirut

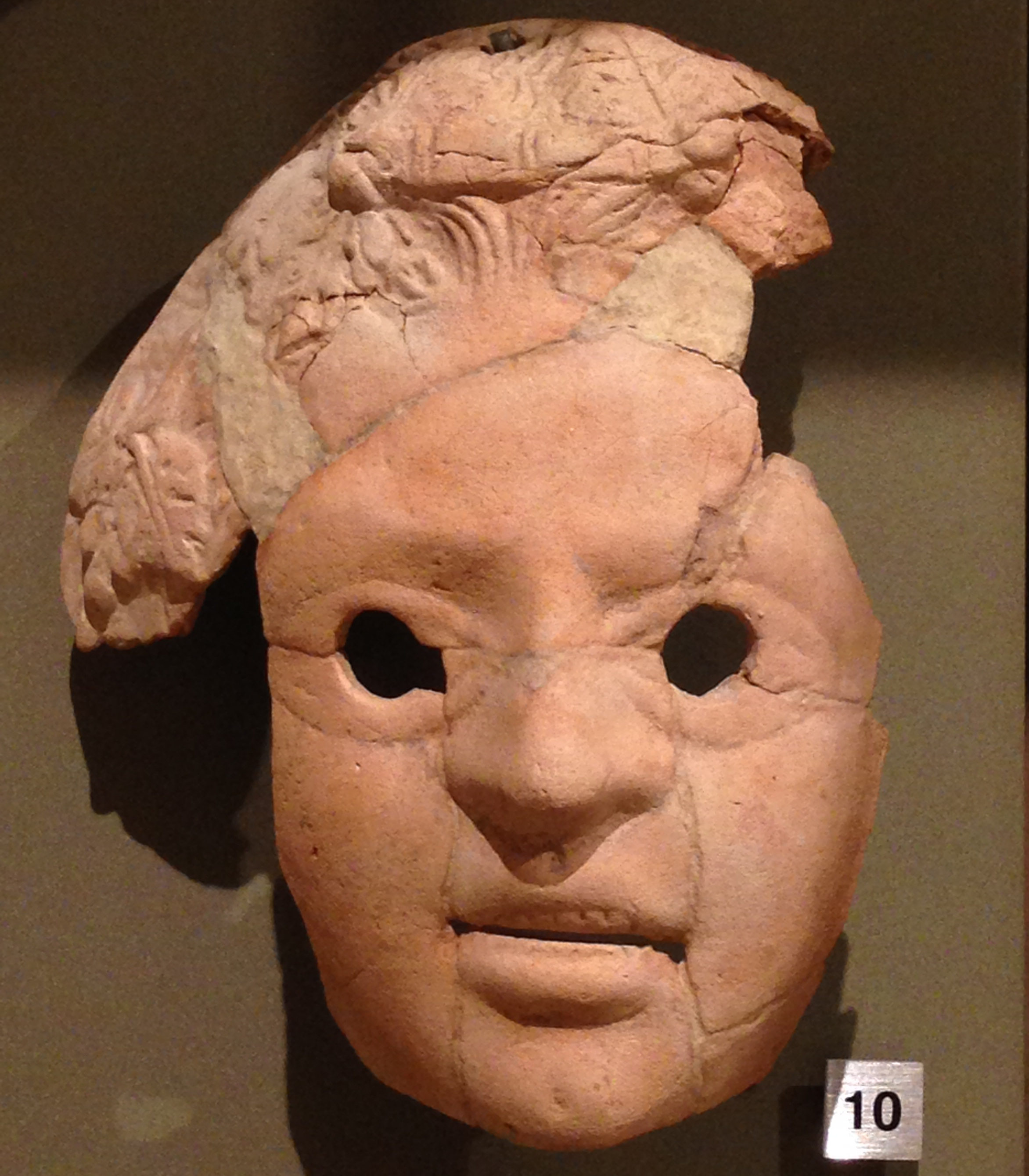
Hellenistic theatre mask from Tyre, National Museum of Beirut

After his decisive victories over the Persian king Darius III in 333 BC at the Granicus and Issus, Alexander the Great moved his armies south to Syria and the Levant, exacting tribute from all of coastal Phoenicia's city-states. When he arrived at Tyre, Alexander proposed a sacrifice at the Temple of Heracles on the fortified island. The Tyrian government refused this, suggesting instead that Alexander sacrifice at another temple of Heracles on the mainland at Old Tyre.

Angered by this rejection and the city's loyalty to Darius, Alexander laid siege to the city. His troops demolished the old city on the mainland and used its stones to construct a causeway to the island. Tall siege towers were moved via this man-made land bridge to overcome the fortified city walls. While Alexander's forces were linking the fortified island with the mainland, the Tyrians evacuated their women, children, and elderly citizens to Carthage. Some of the Phoenician sailors from Sidon and Byblos — who had been forcefully recruited by Alexander — secretly helped many Tyrians to escape. Some eight thousand Tyrians were reportedly killed during the siege, while another 30,000 citizens were sold into slavery. After Alexander's victory, he granted pardon to King Azemilcus and the chief magistrates.

Tyre rapidly became Hellenized after its conquest by the Macedonians. After Alexander died in 323 BC, his empire was divided among his generals, and Phoenicia was given to Laomedon of Mytilene. The region was heavily contested during the subsequent Wars of the Diadochi (322–281 BC). Alexander's former general Antigonus gained control of Tyre in 315 BC, ruling until his death at the Battle of Ipsus in 301 BC. Antigonus' son Demetrius ruled Phoenicia until 287 BC, when Ptolemy I gained control of it. The city remained under the control of the Ptolemaic Kingdom for almost seventy years, until the Seleucids under Antiochus III invaded Phoenicia in 198 BC. During the Punic Wars, Tyre sympathized with its former colony Carthage. In 195 BC, seven years after his defeat by the Romans, Hannibal fled into voluntary exile from Carthage to Tyre. As the power of the Seleucid Empire started to crumble and Seleucid leaders engaged in dynastic fights, the royal rivals increasingly sought the support of Tyre. In this context, King Alexander Balas gave the city the right to offer asylum in 152 BC.

Despite centuries of military conflict, Tyre thrived as an economic hub and continued to mint its own silver coins. While some of the trade in the Eastern Mediterranean was diverted to Alexandria, Tyre profited from the developing commerce along the Silk Road. Some authors claim that Tyre was the birthplace of Euclid, the "Father of Geometry" (c. 325 BC). Other prominent scholars from Tyre during the Hellenistic period included the philosophers Diodorus of Tyre, Antipater of Tyre, and Apollonius of Tyre.

== Independence from Seleucid Empire (126–64 BC) ==
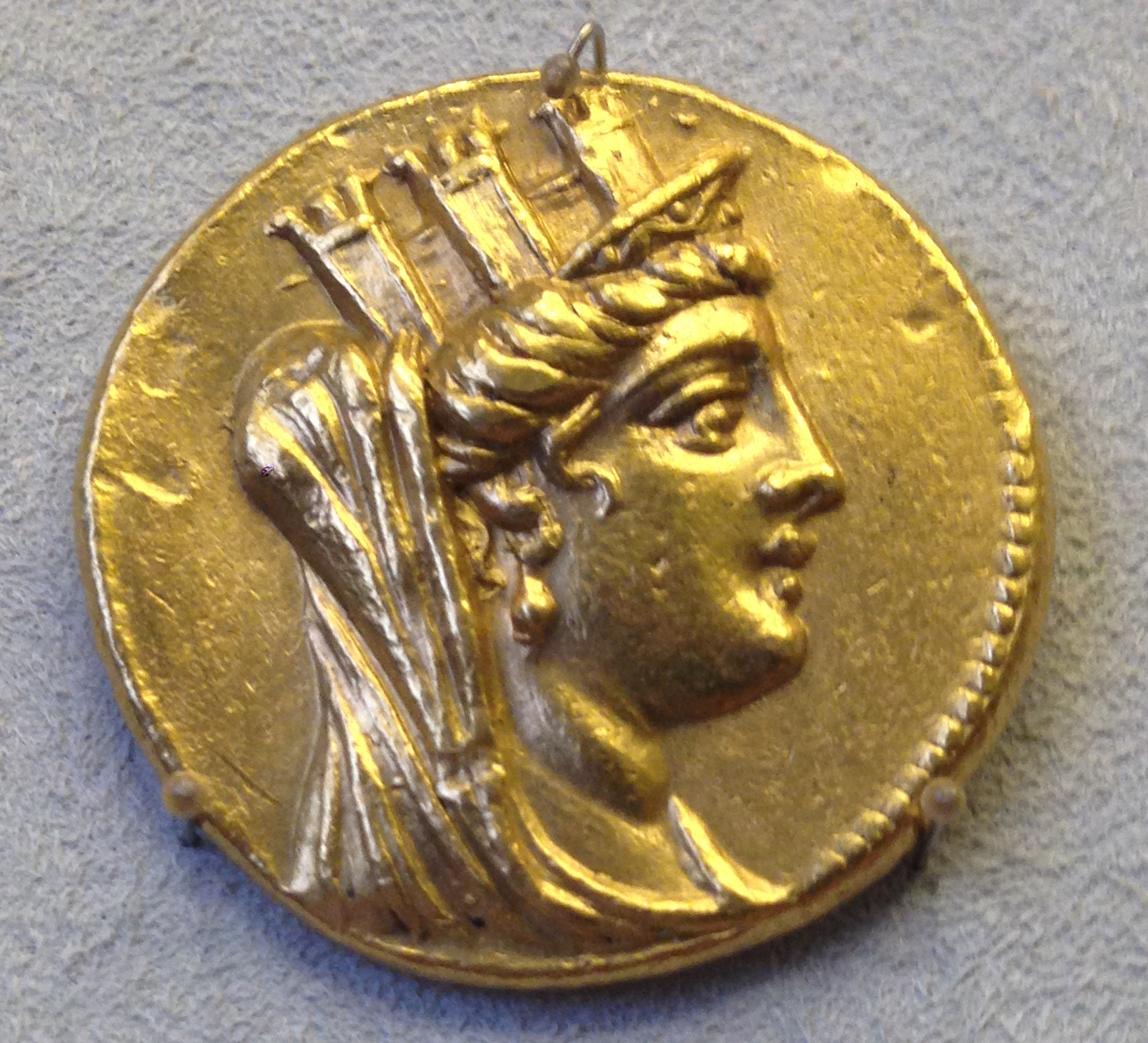
Golden double shekel minted in Tyre, 104–103 BC, depicting Tyche with a crown of towers, Bode Museum (Berlin)

In 126 BC, Tyre regained its independence from the fading Seleucid Empire. One year later, the toppled Seleucid King Demetrius II Nicator fled to Tyre. Also still in 125 BC, Tyre adopted its own lunar-solar hybrid calendar, which was used for 150 years. The coins of independent Tyre became the standard currency in the eastern Mediterranean.

After the start of the Mithridatic Wars between the expanding Roman Republic and the Kingdom of Pontus in 88 BCE, Tyrian trade activities increasingly suffered from the instability which persisted in the region. Five years later the ruling classes of the Levant asked Tigranes II, king of Armenia, to become the ruler of Phoenicia in 83 BC and restore order. Nevertheless, Tyre succeeded in preserving its independence.

Following the 69 BC defeat of Tigranes' army in the Third Mithridatic War against Roman troops led by Lucius Licinius Lucullus, Antiochus XIII Asiaticus nominally restored the Seleucid rule over the region. However, as a client king thanks to Lucullus' approval he apparently did not wield any actual power over Tyre. Lucullus' successor Pompey had Antiochus assassinated and thus ended the Seleucid dynasty for good.

== Roman period (64 BC – 395 AD) ==
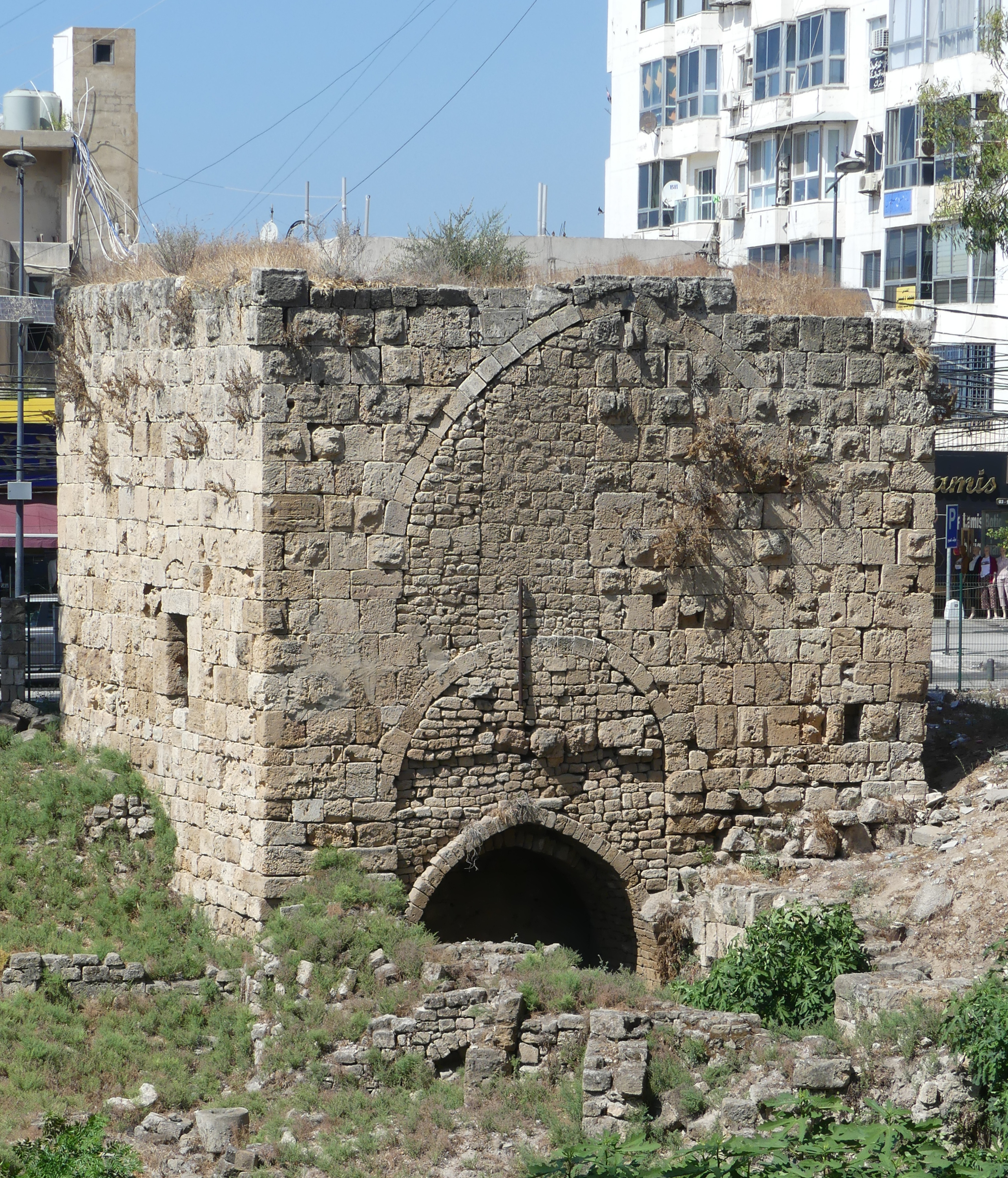
"Ain Sur"

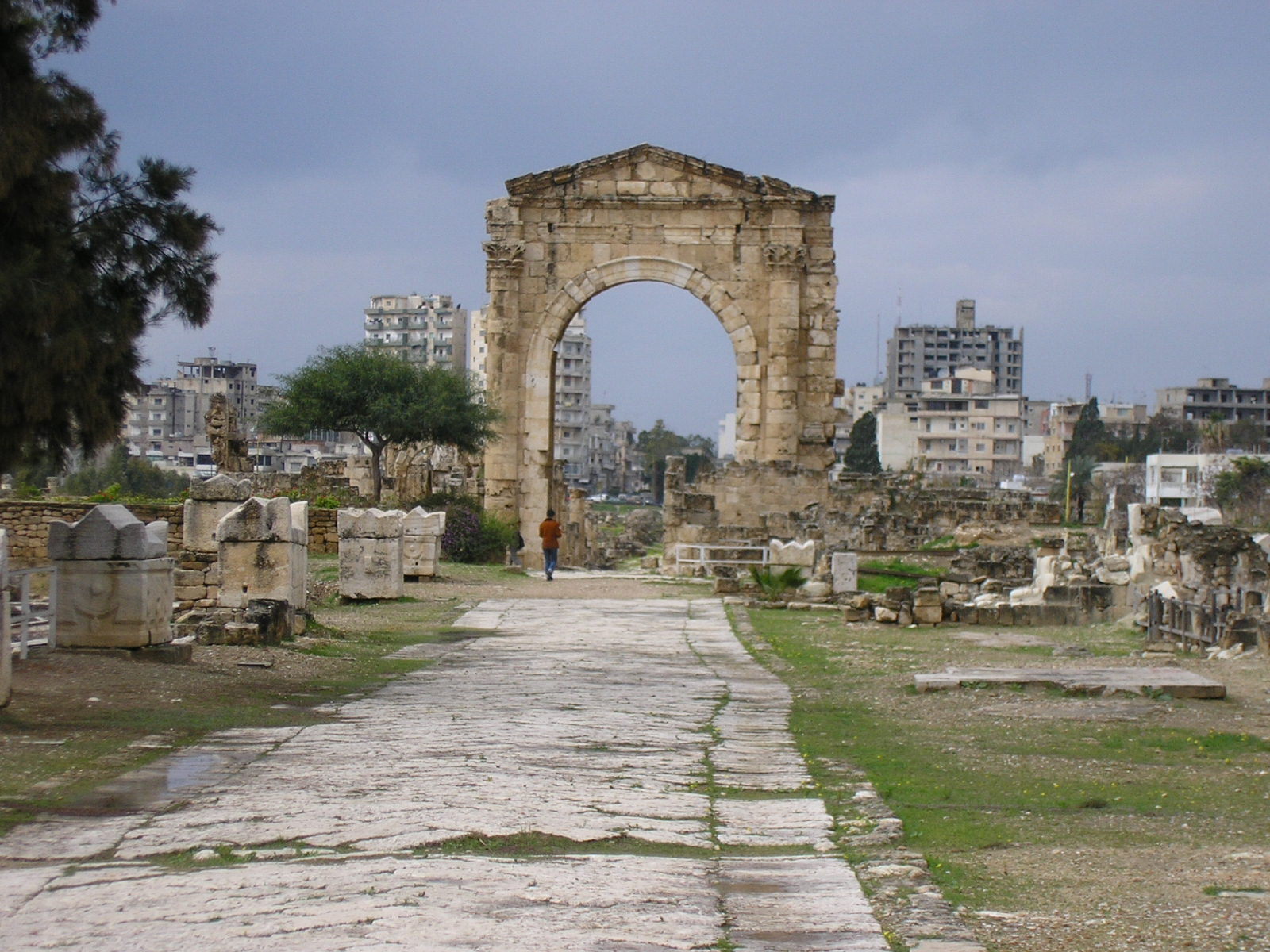
The Triumphal Arch (reconstructed)

In 64 BC the area of "Syria" became a province of the Roman Republic. Tyre was allowed to keep much of its independence as a "civitas foederata". A decree found at Tyre implies that Marcus Aemilius Scaurus — Pompey's deputy in Syria — played the key role in granting Tyre the privileged status of remaining a free city. Scaurus did apparently so "against a certain payment". Thus, Tyre continued to maintain much of its commercial importance. Apart from purple dye, the production of linen became a main industry in the city, as well as garum fish sauce. The city was embellished by Herod, king of Judaea, who constructed halls, porticoes, temples, and marketplaces.

Its geographical location made Tyre the "natural" port of Damascus, to which it was linked through a road during the Roman period, and an important meeting point of the Silk Road. Thus the Tyrians extended their areas of hegemony over the adjoining regions, such as in northern Palestine region, settling in cities such as Kedesh, Mount Carmel and north of Baca.

It is stated in the New Testament that Jesus visited the region of Sidon and Tyre, where he performed the exorcism of the Syrophoenician woman's daughter. Some sources tell that he drank water with John sitting on a rock by the spring of Ain Sur (Source of Tyre), which is also known as Ain Hiram, named after the Phoenician king. A Christian congregation was founded in Tyre soon after the death of St. Stephen. Paul the Apostle, on his return from his third missionary journey, spent a week in conversation with the disciples there.

In the early second century AD Emperor Hadrian, who visited the cities of the East around 130 AD, conferred the title of Metropolis on Tyre: "great city", mother of other cities. This status was of "utmost importance", as it settled the ancient rivalry with Sidon in Tyre's favour – for the time being. According to the Suda encyclopedia, the orator Paulus of Tyre, who served as an ambassador to the Imperial court in Rome, played the main role in securing this prestigious title. Hadrian also allowed Tyre to mint its own coins.

Subsequently, the famous Triumphal Arch and the Tyre Hippodrome, one of the largest hippodromes in the world (480m long and 160m wide), were constructed. The amphitheater for the horse-racetrack could host some 30,000 spectators. An aqueduct of about 5 km length was built to supply the city with water from the Ras Al Ain basins in the South.

In the middle of the second century, the cartographer Marinus of Tyre became the founder of mathematical geography. Other famous scholars from Roman Tyre include the jurist Ulpian, as well as the philosophers Maximus of Tyre and Porphyry of Tyre.

The city continued to maintain overseas merchant stations during the Roman period, including one at Puteoli and another at Rome. They functioned as institutional bases for Tyrian traders. In 174 AD, Tyrian merchants at Puteoli petitioned the civic authorities of Tyre for financial support to maintain their station, and the issue was debated in the Tyrian council (boule).

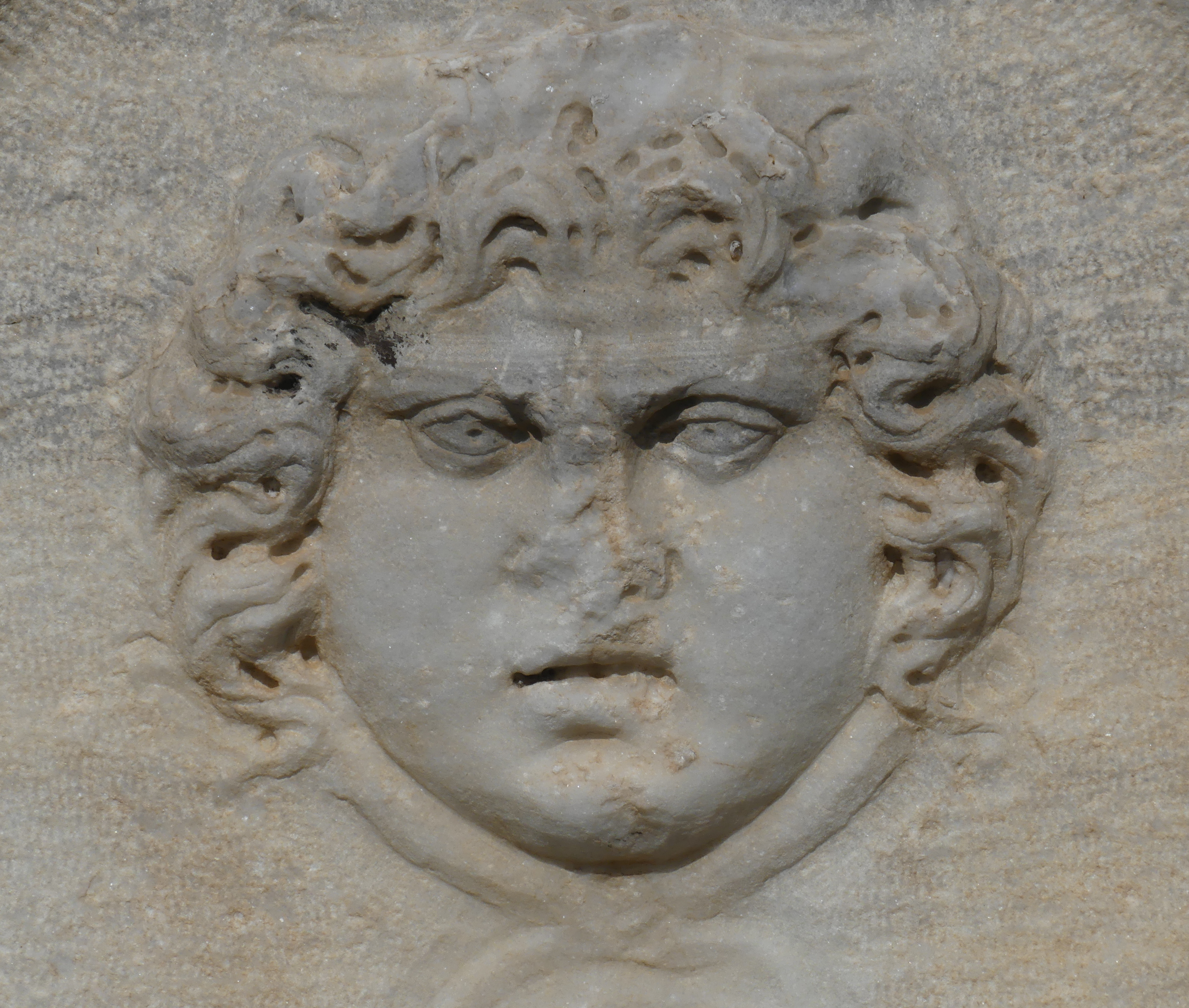
Relief on a sarcophagus in Al Bass

When in 193 AD Septimius Severus and Pescennius Niger competed against each other for the throne of Rome, Tyre sided with Severus, who was born in Tyre's former colony Leptis Magna. Niger's troops in retaliation looted Tyre and killed many of its inhabitants. Yet after the defeat of his rival, Severus rewarded Tyre's loyalty with the status of a Colony, which enabled the city to regain some of its wealth as it granted Tyrians Roman citizenship, with the same rights as Romans themselves. In 198 AD Tyre became the capital of the province Syria Phoenice.

During the third century CE the Heraclia games — dedicated to Melqart-Heracles (not to be confused with the demigod Heracles, hero of the 12 labors) — were held in the Tyrian hippodrome every four years. Faced with the growth of Christianity in the third century, the Roman authorities supported paganism and encouraged the practise of Tyre's ancient cults, especially the worshipping of Melqart. When Emperor Decius ordered a general prosecution of Christians in 250–251 AD, followers of Jesus in Tyre suffered as well. According to the ancient bishop and historian Eusebius, the Christian scholar Origen died in Tyre around 253 AD due to injuries from torture.

Jewish sages from the Land of Israel, including amoraim such as Yaakov of Naboria (in the Upper Galilee) and R. Mana bar Tanchum, traveled to Tyre to engage in halakha instruction, answer questions, and interpret biblical verses. R. Shimon bar Yochai highlighted permissible Shabbat travel routes, including one from Tyre to Sidon. There are also indications of movement from the Land of Israel to Tyre and evidence of Jews from Tyre and Sidon settling in Sepphoris, where they established leadership around a local synagogue.

In the wake of the Diocletianic Persecution as the last and most severe persecution of Christians in the Roman Empire, followers of Jesus in Tyre were harshly affected as well. According to religious accounts, one of the most prominent martyrs was Saint Christina, the daughter of the city's governor, who was executed around 300 AD, after her own father had her tortured. In 304 AD some 500 Christians were reportedly persecuted, tortured and killed in Tyre. Around the same time, a heavy earthquake struck the city, causing death and destruction.

However, less than a decade later "the young, and very rich" Bishop Paulinus had a basilica constructed upon the ruins of a demolished church, which in turn had probably been built upon the ruins of the ancient Temple of Melqart. Reportedly, Origen was buried behind the altar. (Note: Origen was buried in the Holy Sepulchre's church of St Mary, not in the Latin Cathedral of Tyre.) In 315 AD, just two years after the Edict of Milan about the benevolent treatment of Christians, the cathedral was inaugurated by Bishop Eusebius, who recorded his speech and thus a detailed account of the site in his writings. Not only is this considered the oldest description of a church, but the Cathedral of Paulinus is considered the oldest in Church history.

Subsequently, Tyre became caput et metropolis, "head and capital" of the churches of the region.

== Byzantine period (395–640) ==
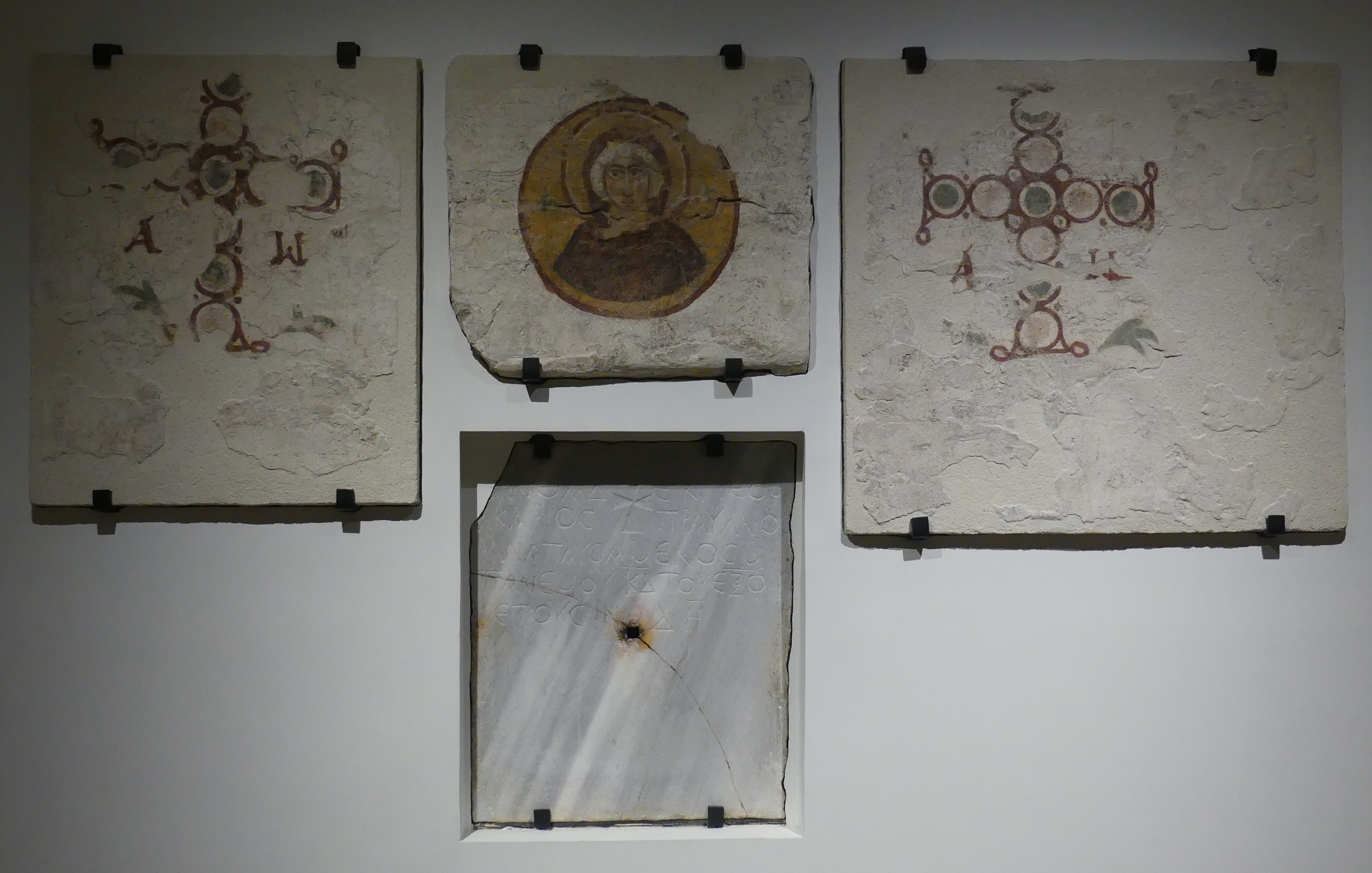
From Al Bass, dated 440: "possibly the oldest fresco of the Virgin Mary worldwide." (National Museum, Beirut)

In 395, Tyre became part of the Byzantine Empire and continued to flourish. Its traditional industries remained prominent during this period but the city prospered most from Tyre's strategic position on the Silk Road, which also allowed it to profit from establishing silk production after the secret procedures had been smuggled out of China.

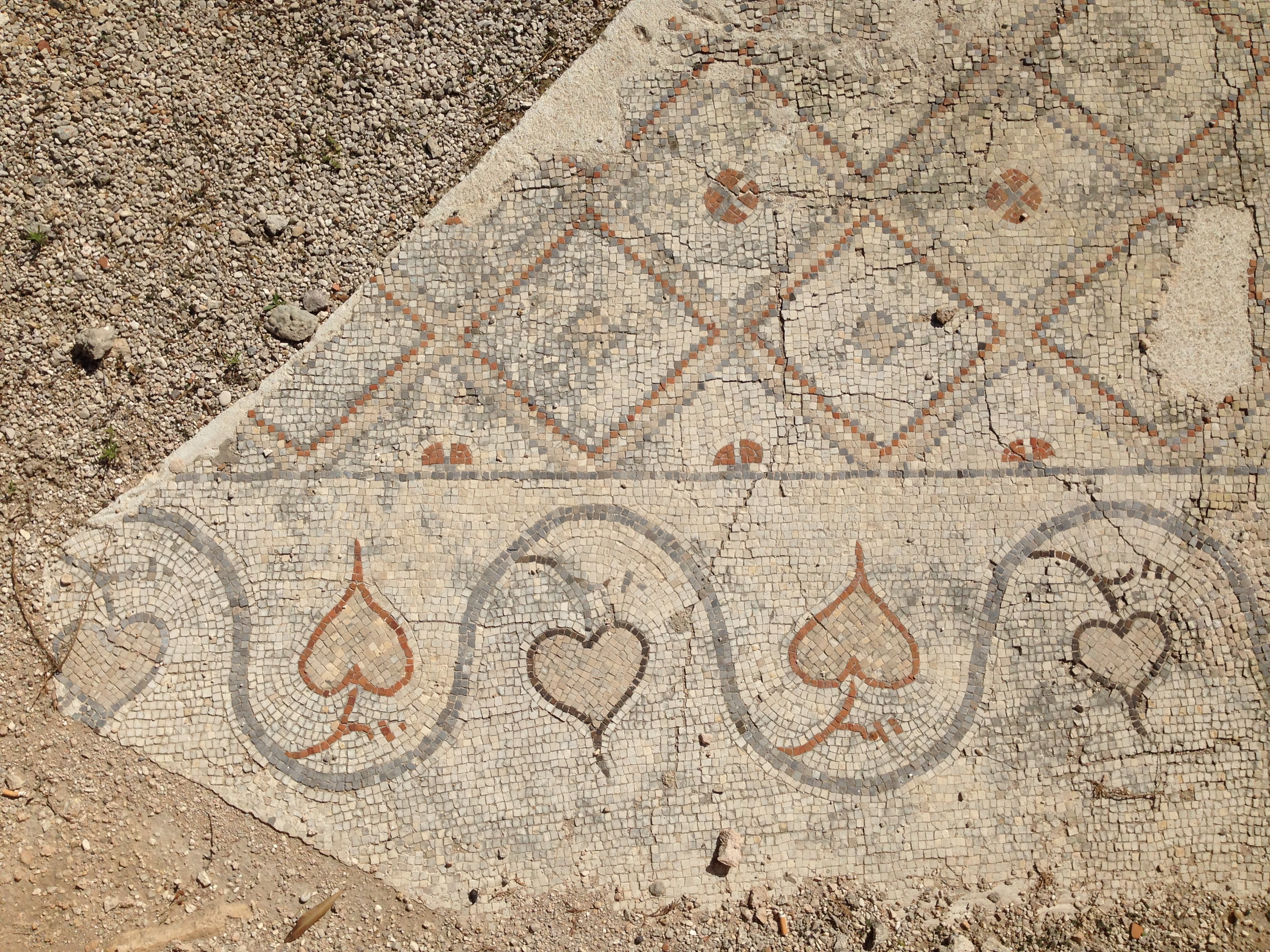
Mosaic, Al Mina, probably Byzantine

The necropolis on mainland Tyre with more than three hundred sarcophagi from the Roman and Byzantine periods grew to be one of the largest in the world. A main road of some 400m length and 4,5m width paved with limestone was constructed there during Byzantine times. Close by, two churches with marble decorations were built in the 5th and early 6th century AD respectively, when construction in ancient Tyre reached its zenith.

During the entire period of Byzantine rule, the archbishopric of Tyre had primacy over all the bishops of the Levant. Yet, while Christianity was the main religion, some people reportedly continued to worship the Phoenician deities, especially Melqart.

Over the course of the 6th century AD, starting in 502, a series of earthquakes shattered the city. The worst was the 551 Beirut earthquake which was accompanied by a Tsunami: it destroyed the Great Triumphal Arch on the mainland, while the Egyptian harbour and parts of the suburb on the Southern part of the peninsula were submerged in the sea.

In addition, the city and its population increasingly suffered during the 6th century from the political chaos that ensued when the Byzantine empire was torn apart by wars.

The city remained under Byzantine control until it was captured by the Persians under the Sassanian shah, Khosrow II at the turn from the 6th to the 7th century AD, and then briefly regained until the Muslim conquest of the Levant, when in 640 it was taken by the Arab forces of the Rashidun Caliphate.

== Early Muslim period (640–1124) ==
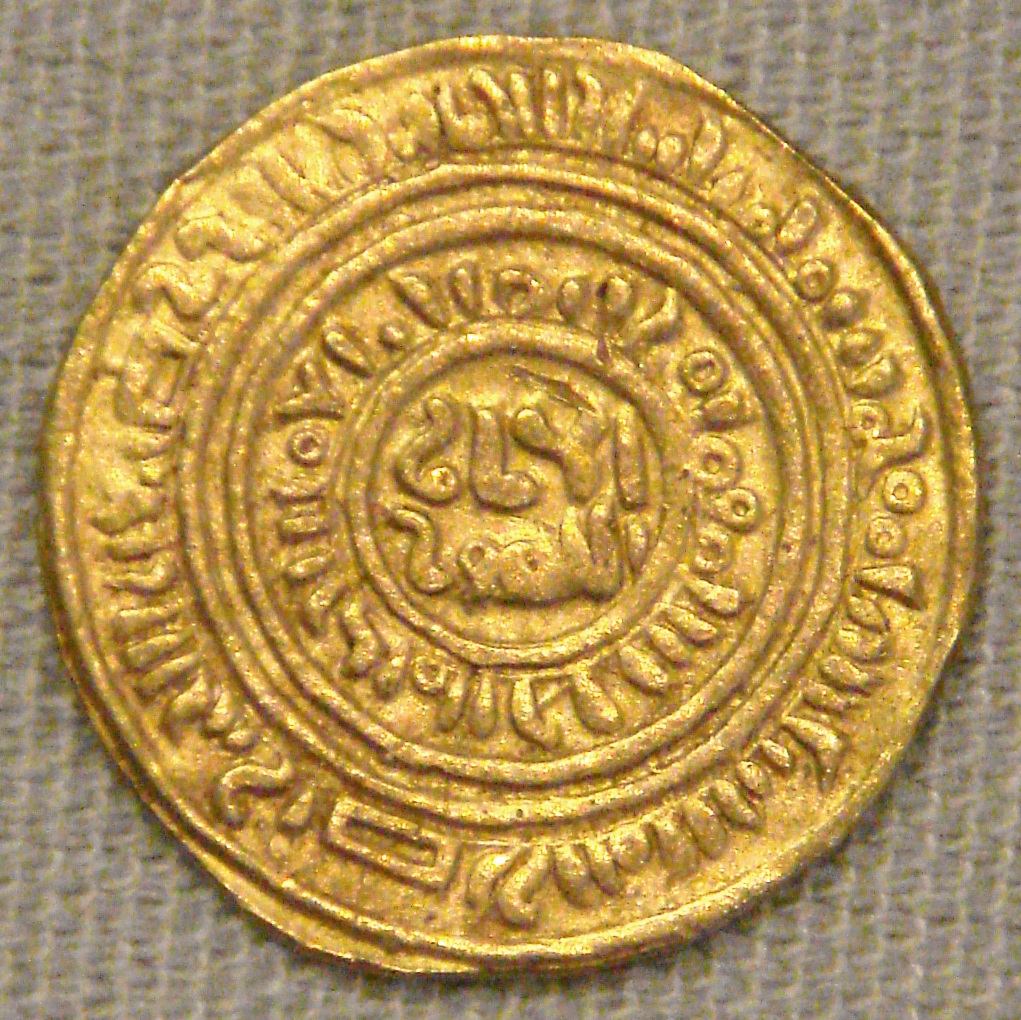
Fatimid dinar minted in Tyre, 1118, British Museum

As the bearers of Islam restored peace and order, Tyre soon prospered again and continued to do so during half a millennium of caliphate rule. This was despite the fact that the city stayed reduced to a part of the old island after the devastations of the earthquakes in the 6th century.

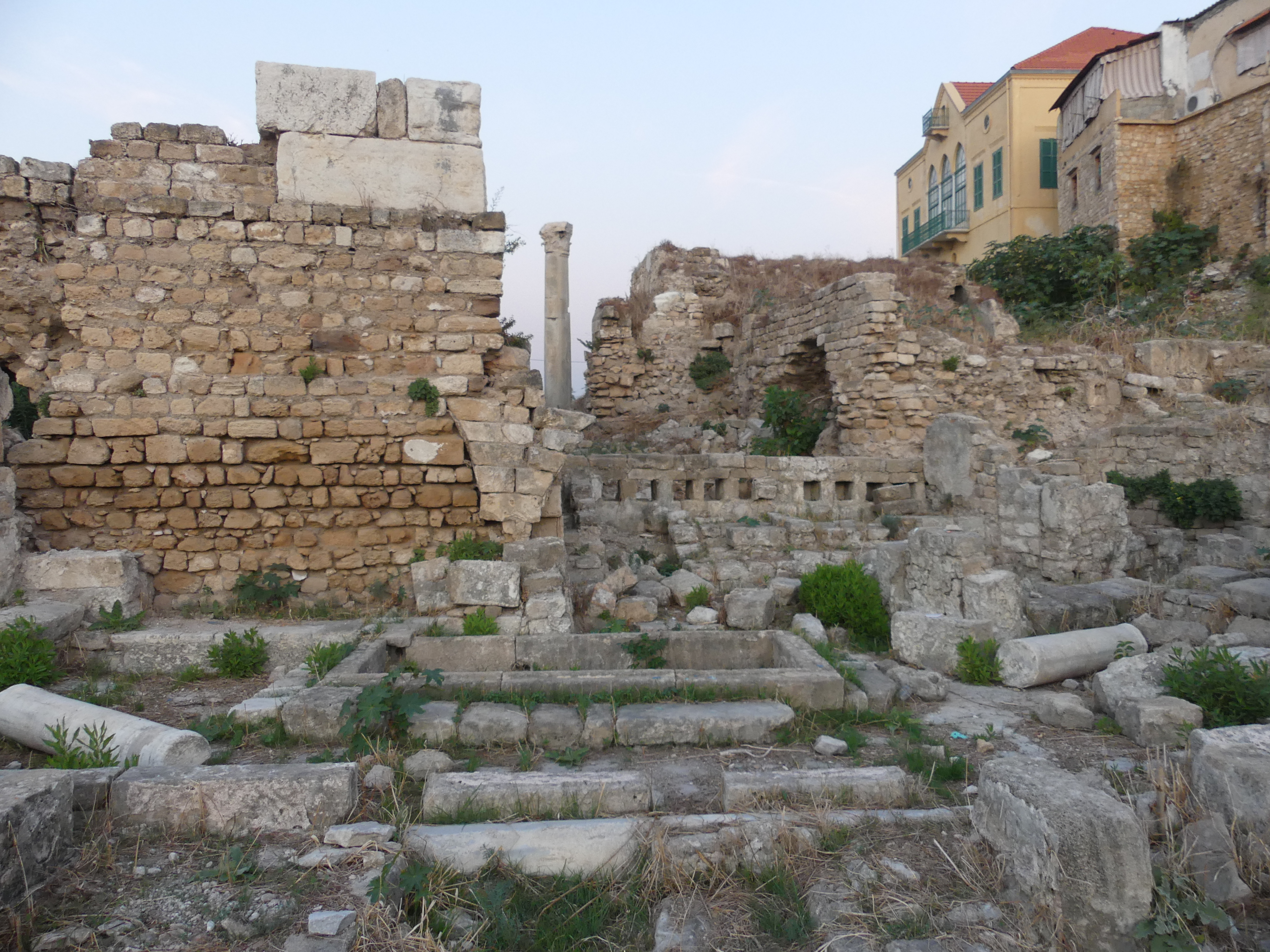
Remains of the Fatimid Mosque: water basin and circuits for ablutions

In the late 640s, the caliph's governor Muawiyah launched his naval invasions of Cyprus from Tyre, but the Rashidun period only lasted until 661. It was followed by the Umayyad Caliphate (until 750) and the Abbasid Caliphate. Tyre became a cultural center of the Arab world which hosted many well-known scholars and artists.

In the course of the centuries, Islam spread and Arabic became the language of administration instead of Greek, though some people reportedly continued to worship the ancient cult of Melqart. As in previous centuries, there were also Jewish residents, some of whom engaged in trade.

During the Ismaili Shia Fatimid Caliphate, a Grand Mosque was constructed in the place that probably had been the location of the Temple of Melqart. Meanwhile, Tyre's economy remained part of the Silk Road and continued its traditional industries of purple dye and glass production. Excavation at the Al Mina site have revealed glass furnaces from the early Islamic period that had the capacity to produce in a single-melt session over fifty tonnes of glass. In addition, sugar production from cane fields around the city became another main business.

In the Revolt of Tyre (996–998), the populace rose against Fatimid rule, led by an ordinary sailor named 'Allaqa. However, the caliph al-Hakim bi-Amr Allah sent his army and navy to blockade and retake the city. A Byzantine squadron's attempt to reinforce the defenders was repulsed with heavy losses. After two years of siege, the Fatimids looted the city and massacred the insurgents.

In 1086 it fell into the hands of the Seljuks who lost it in 1089 to the Fatimids. By that time, some estimates put the number of inhabitants at around 20,000. The majority of that population were apparently Shiites.

Ten years later, Tyre avoided being attacked by paying tribute to the Crusaders who marched on Jerusalem. In late 1111, King Baldwin I of Jerusalem laid siege on the city, which in response put itself under the protection of the Seljuk military leader Toghtekin. Supported by Fatimid forces, he intervened and forced the Franks to raise the siege in April 1112, after about 2,000 of Baldwin's troops had been killed. A decade later, the Fatimids sold Tyre to Toghtekin who installed a garrison there.

== Crusader period (1124–1291) ==
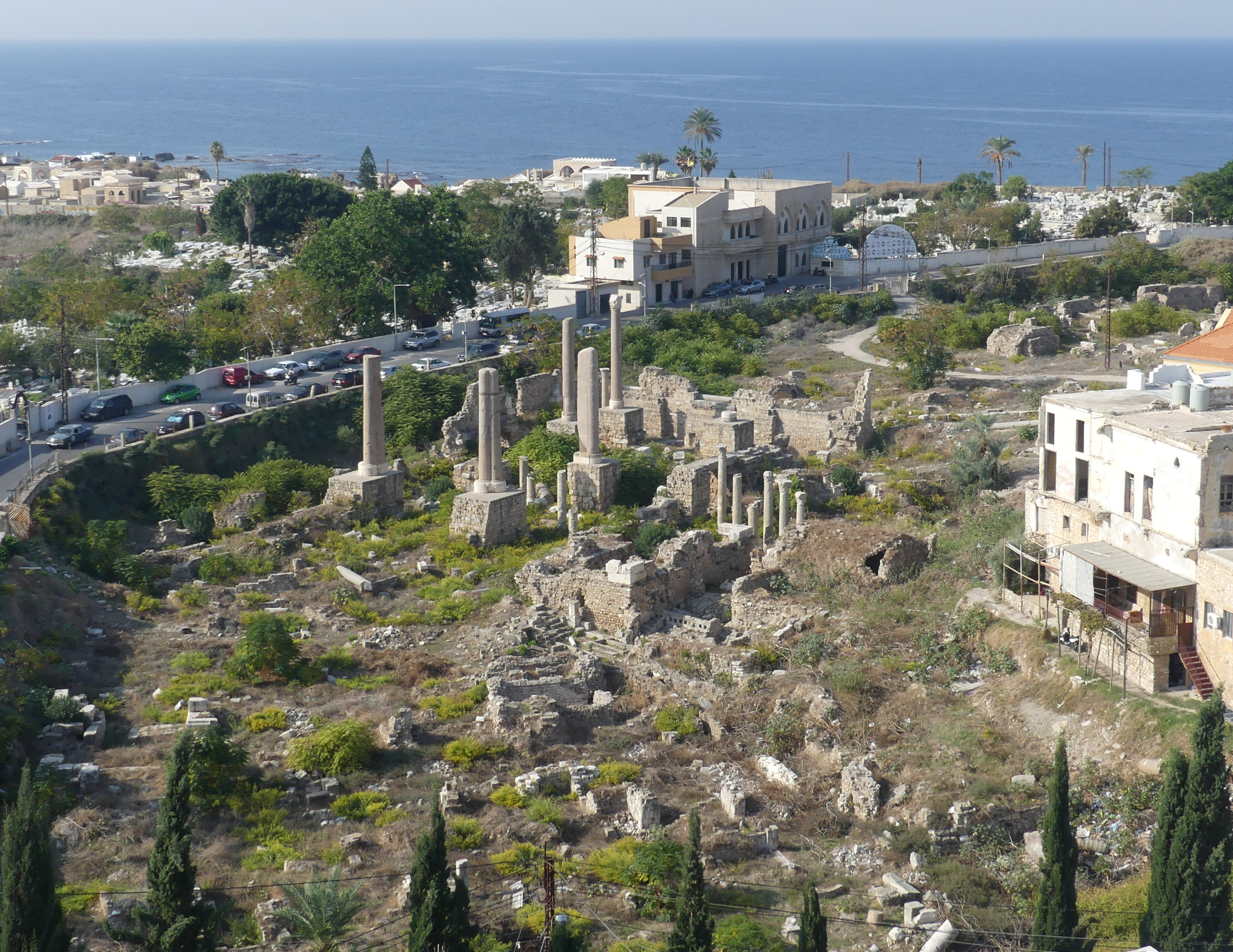
The ruins of the Crusader Crowning Cathedral

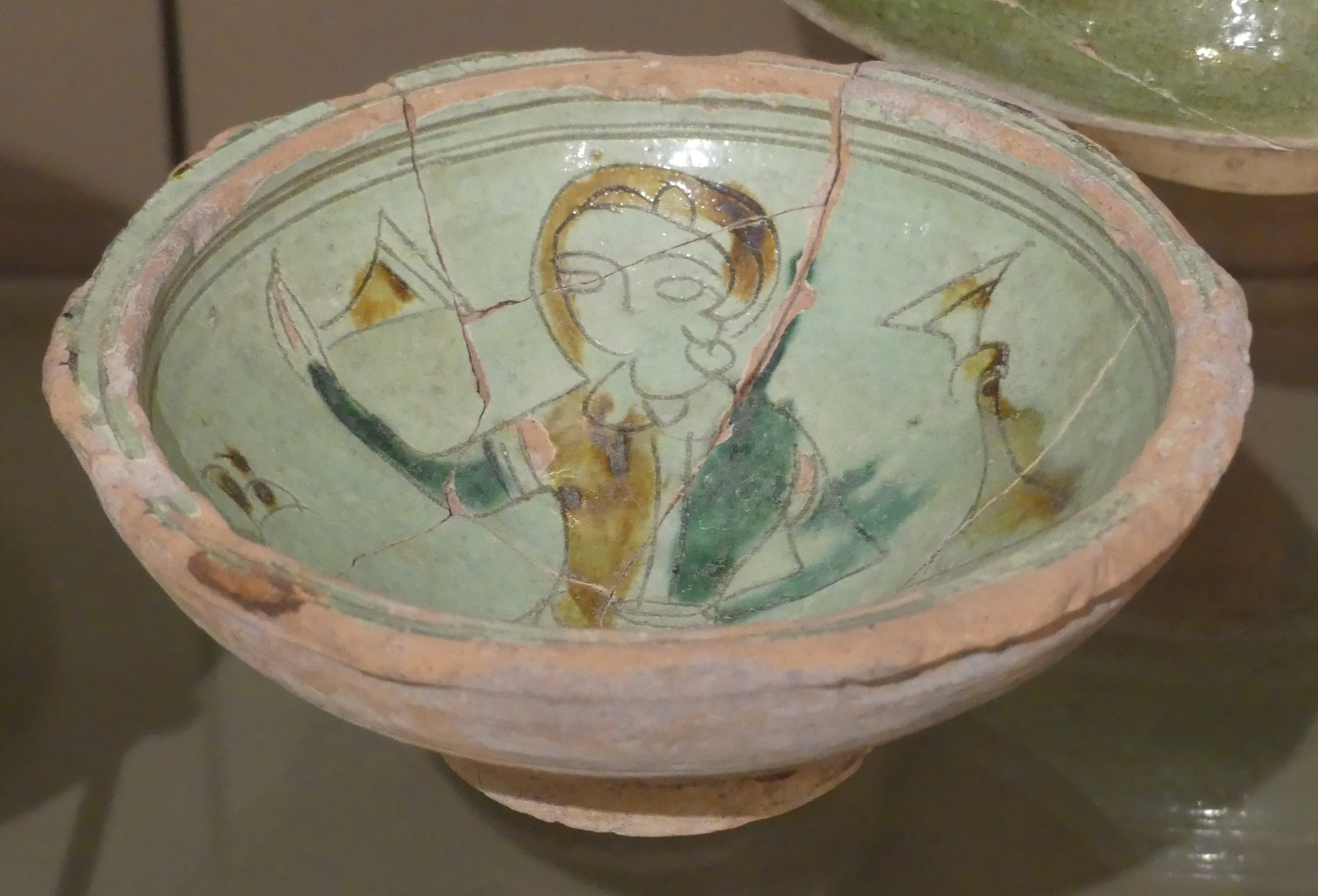
Terracotta cup from Tyre, Crusader period, National Museum of Beirut

On 7 July 1124, in the aftermath of the First Crusade, Tyre was the last city to be taken by the Christian warriors – a Frankish army on the coast and a fleet of the Venetian Crusade from the sea side – following a siege of five and a half months that caused great suffering from hunger to the population. Eventually, Seljuk leader Toghtekin negotiated an agreement for surrender with the authorities of the Latin Kingdom of Jerusalem.

Under its new rulers, Tyre and its countryside were divided into three parts in accordance with the Pactum Warmundi: two-thirds to the royal domain of Baldwin and one third as autonomous trading colonies for the Italian merchant cities: mainly to the Doge of Venice, who had a particular interest in supplying silica sands to the glassmakers of Venice and in the sugar-cane plantations on the mainland. In addition, there were a Genoese quarter, and a Pisan neighbourhood.

In 1127, Tyre was reportedly shaken by a heavy earthquake that caused many casualties. It was followed by the 1157 Hama earthquake and the 1170 Syria earthquake. Although the loss of lives were reportedly small, some towers were damaged in the latter.

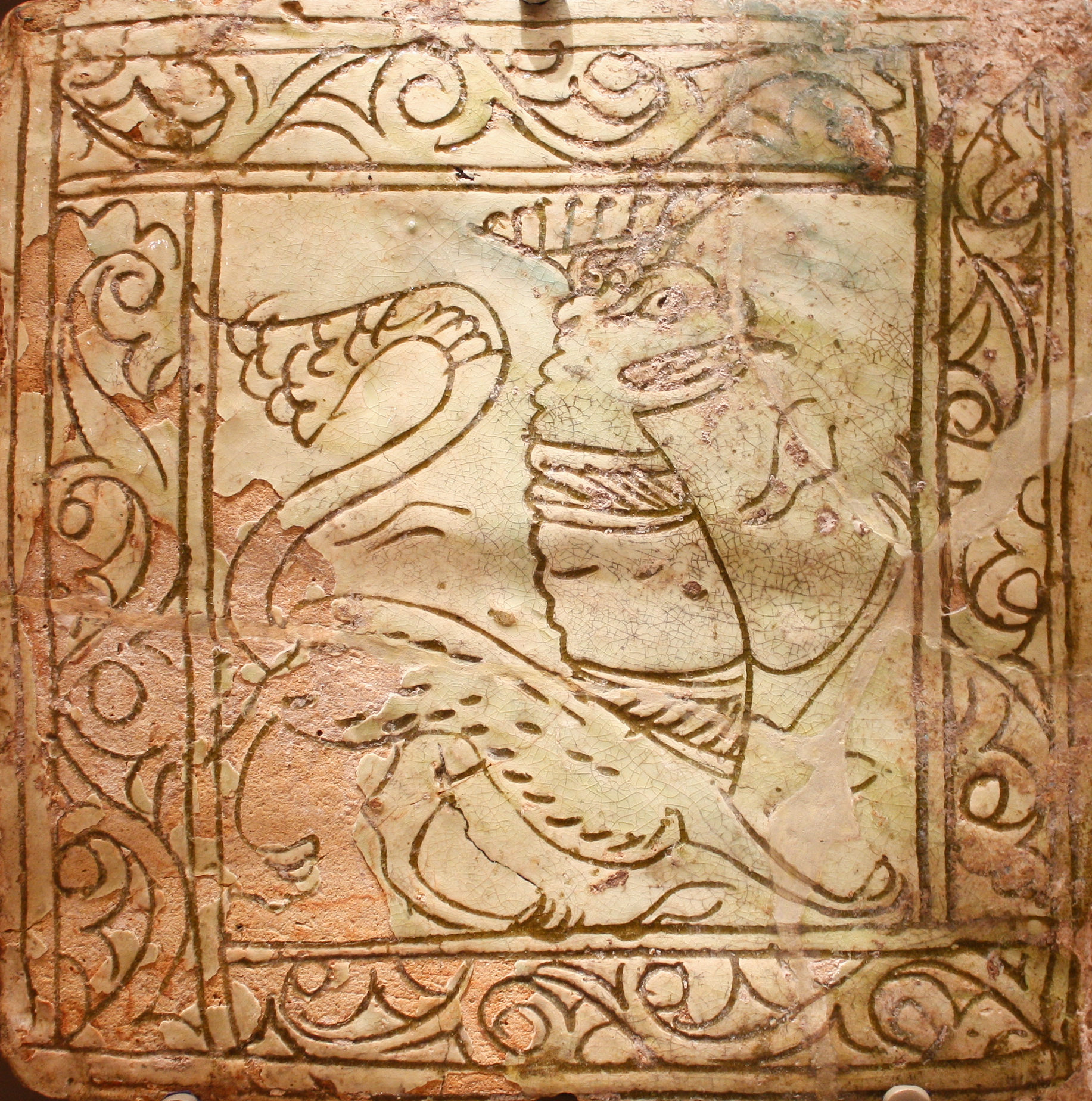
Glazed terracotta tile from Tyre, Crusader period, National Museum of Beirut.

Nevertheless, Tyre became one of the most important cities of the Kingdom of Jerusalem, as it opened the Silk Road to the Western kingdoms. There was much commercial activity, especially glassware by the Jewish community, Sendal silk cloth, purple dye, and sugar factories. The new rulers also continued to mint "Tyre Dinars" that imitated the Fatimid coins.

The city was the see of a Roman Catholic archbishopric, whose archbishop was a suffragan of the Latin Patriarch of Jerusalem; its archbishops often acceded to the Patriarchate. The most notable of the Latin archbishops was the historian William of Tyre, who held the office from 1175 to 1184 and was also chancellor of the kingdom.

The Saint Mark Cathedral was erected upon the ruins of the Fatimid Grand Mosque – which in turn had probably been constructed upon or near the ruins of several iterations of Christian churches and on the lowest level the ancient Temple of Melqart. By 1129, William I of Tyre had also his own cathedral in Tyre dedicated to the Holy Cross, built on the site of a Byzantine church.

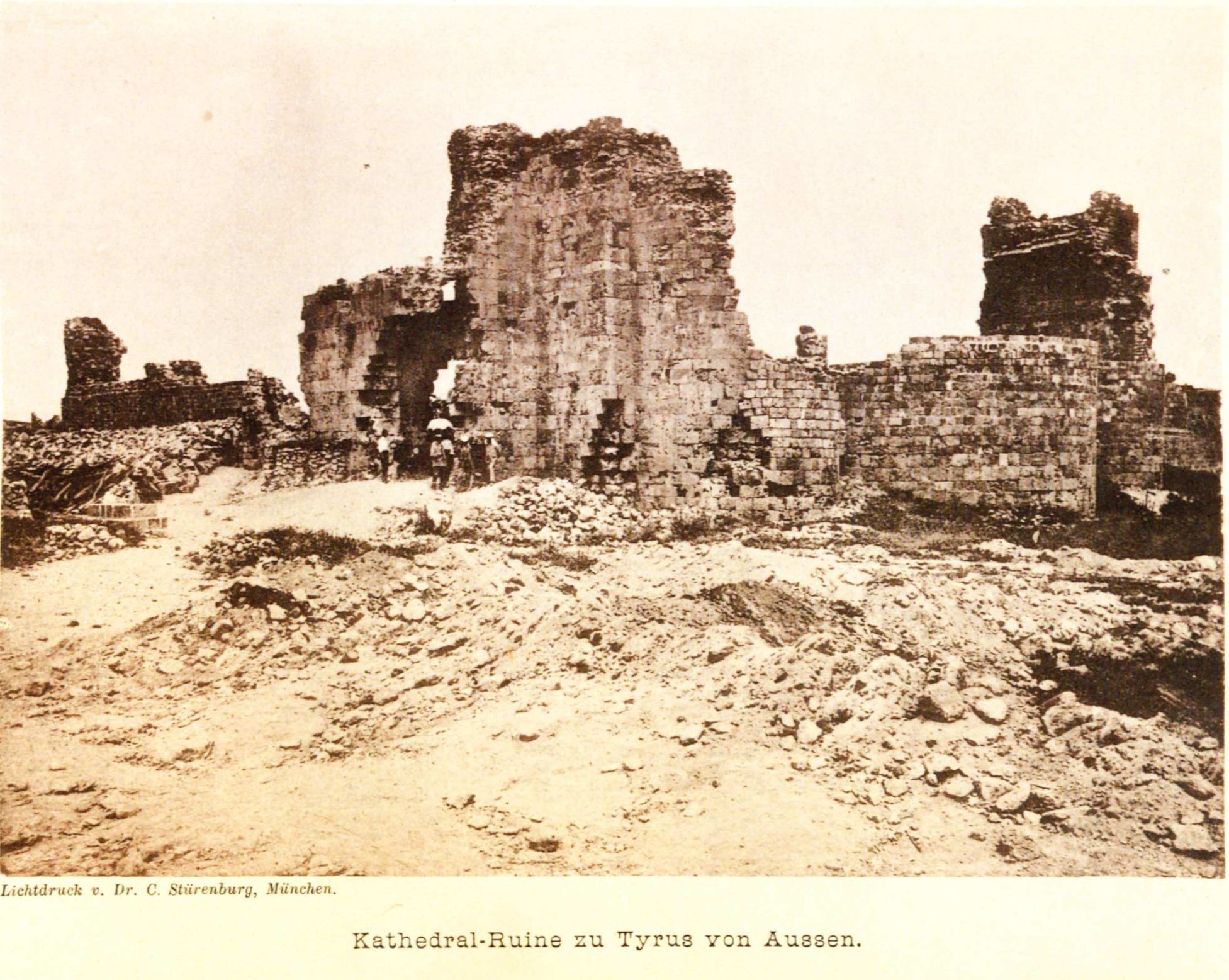
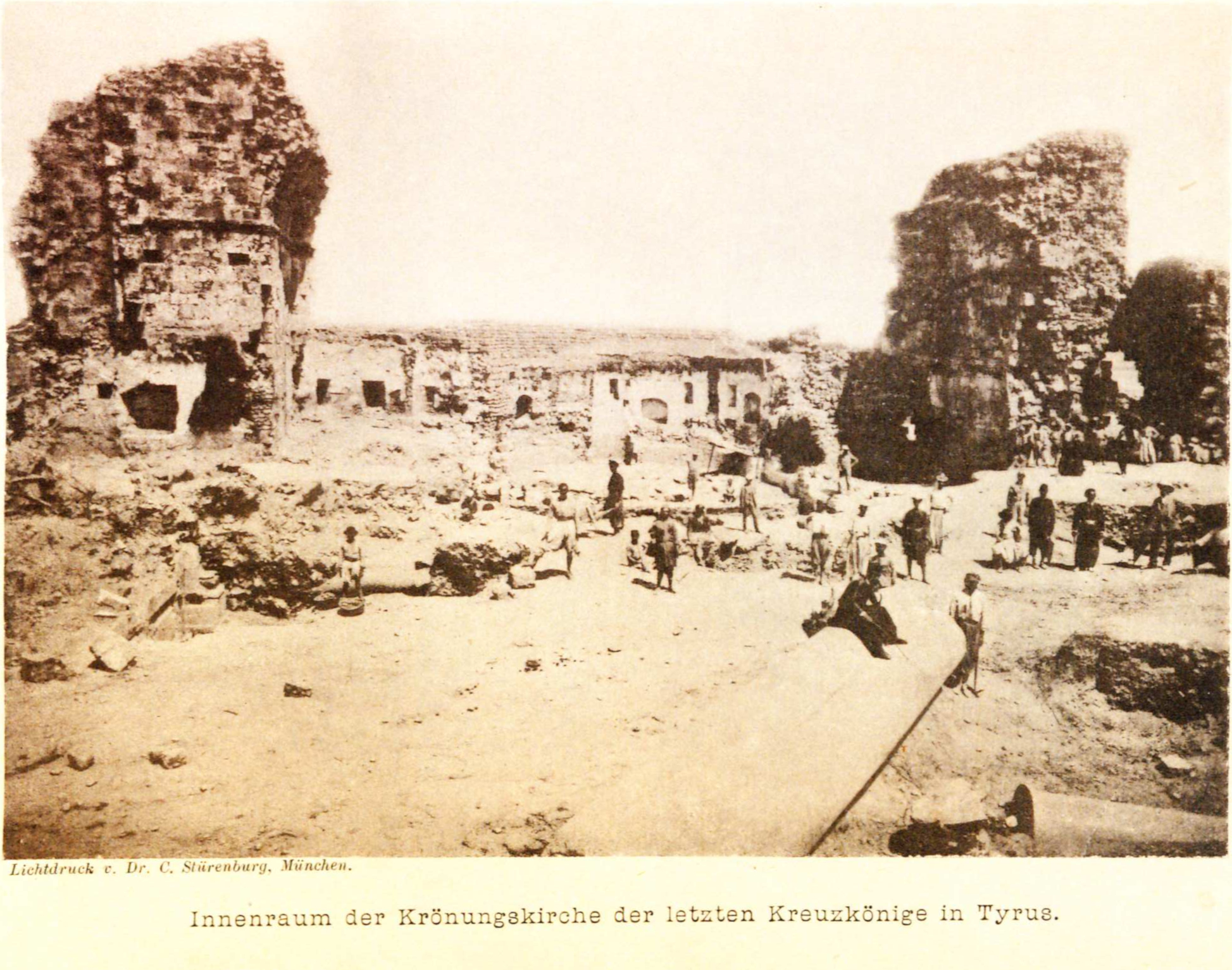
1874 photos of the cathedral ruins by German historian Johann Nepomuk Sepp

Despite this Christian domination, there was peaceful coexistence of religion: the Jewish community was estimated to number some 500 members, many of whom were arabised. Muslims continued to follow Islam, most prominently Um Ali Taqiyya, "one of the first Tyrian women who excelled in poetry and literature". There were reportedly even still followers of the ancient religion of Melqart. Many locals, especially in the surrounding villages, still held Phoenician theophoric names. Contemporary estimates put the number of residents at around 25,000.

After the loss of Jerusalem to Saladin in 1187, many crusaders escaped to Tyre with its strong fortifications: "The refugee barons of Palestine were now crowded in the city." Saladin put on the Siege of Tyre twice but gave up on New Year's Day 1188. Thanks to Frankish military and naval reinforcements, Conrad of Montferrat was able to organise an effective defense.

Subsequently, Tyre's Cathedral became the traditional coronation place for the kings of Jerusalem and a venue for royal marriages. While the Venetian influence was considerably weakened, their privileges infringed and fiefs confiscated, the position of Genoa and Pisa was strengthened as a reward for their support of Conrad.

When the Holy Roman Emperor Frederick I drowned in 1190 in Asia Minor while leading an army in the Third Crusade, his bones were reportedly buried in the cathedral of Tyre.

Tyre remained for four years the only city of the Latin Kingdom under Frankish rule – until the reconquest of Acre by Richard I of England on 12 July 1191, when the seat of the kingdom moved there.

On 27 April 1192, Conrad of Montferrat – who had been elected as king of Jerusalem just days before – was assassinated at Tyre by members of the Order of Assassins.

Ten years later, the 1202 Syria earthquake caused very severe damages in Tyre. Most of the towers and walls collapsed and many people died.

In 1210, John of Brienne and his wife Maria of Montferrat were crowned King and Queen of Jerusalem in Tyre.

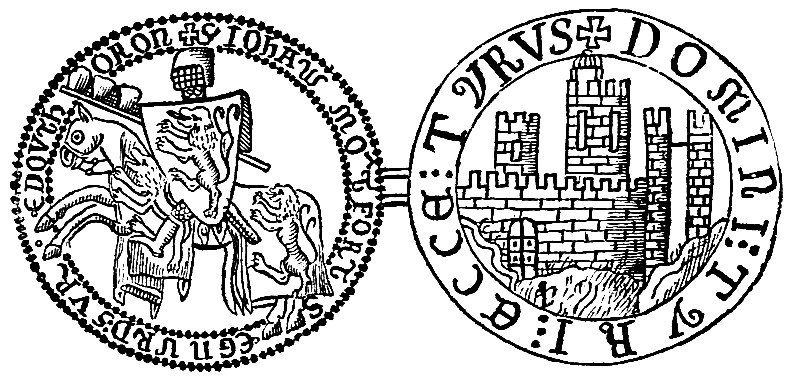
"TYRUS DOMINI TYRI ACCA"—The seal of John of Montfort depicting Tyre's fortifications (right)

After the Sixth Crusade, from 1231 onwards, the forces of Riccardo Filangieri occupied Tyre on behalf of Emperor Frederick II of Hohenstaufen for more than a decade. They were defeated in 1242 by the baronial party and its Venetian allies. Balian of Ibelin, Lord of Beirut, was appointed royal custodian of Tyre on behalf of Queen Alice of Cyprus. In 1246, King Henry I of Cyprus separated Tyre from the royal domain and assigned the Lordship of Tyre to Philip of Montfort.

In 1257 – one year after the beginning of the War of Saint Sabas between Genoa and Venice over control of Acre – Philip expelled the Venetians from the one third of the city that had been conceded to them more than a century earlier, though its quasi-exterritorial status was eroded already from early on.

In May 1269, the Mamluk Sultan Baibars led an abortive raid upon Tyre after failed negotiations about a truce. In September of that year, Hugh III of Cyprus was crowned King of Jerusalem in Tyre. A year later, Philip was killed by an assassin, apparently in the employ of Baibars, and succeeded by his eldest son, John of Montfort. He entered a treaty with Baibars, transferring control over five villages to him. In 1277, he also restored Venetian privileges.

After John's death in 1283 and the death of his brother Humphrey of Montfort in 1284, John's widow Margaret of Antioch-Lusignan – the sister of Hugh III – became the Lady of Tyre. Two years later she entered into a land control treaty with Baibars' successor Al-Mansur Qalawun.

In 1291, Margaret ceded the Lordship of Tyre to her nephew Amalric of Lusignan and retired to the monastery of Our Lady of Tyre in Nicosia.

== Mamluk period (1291–1516) ==
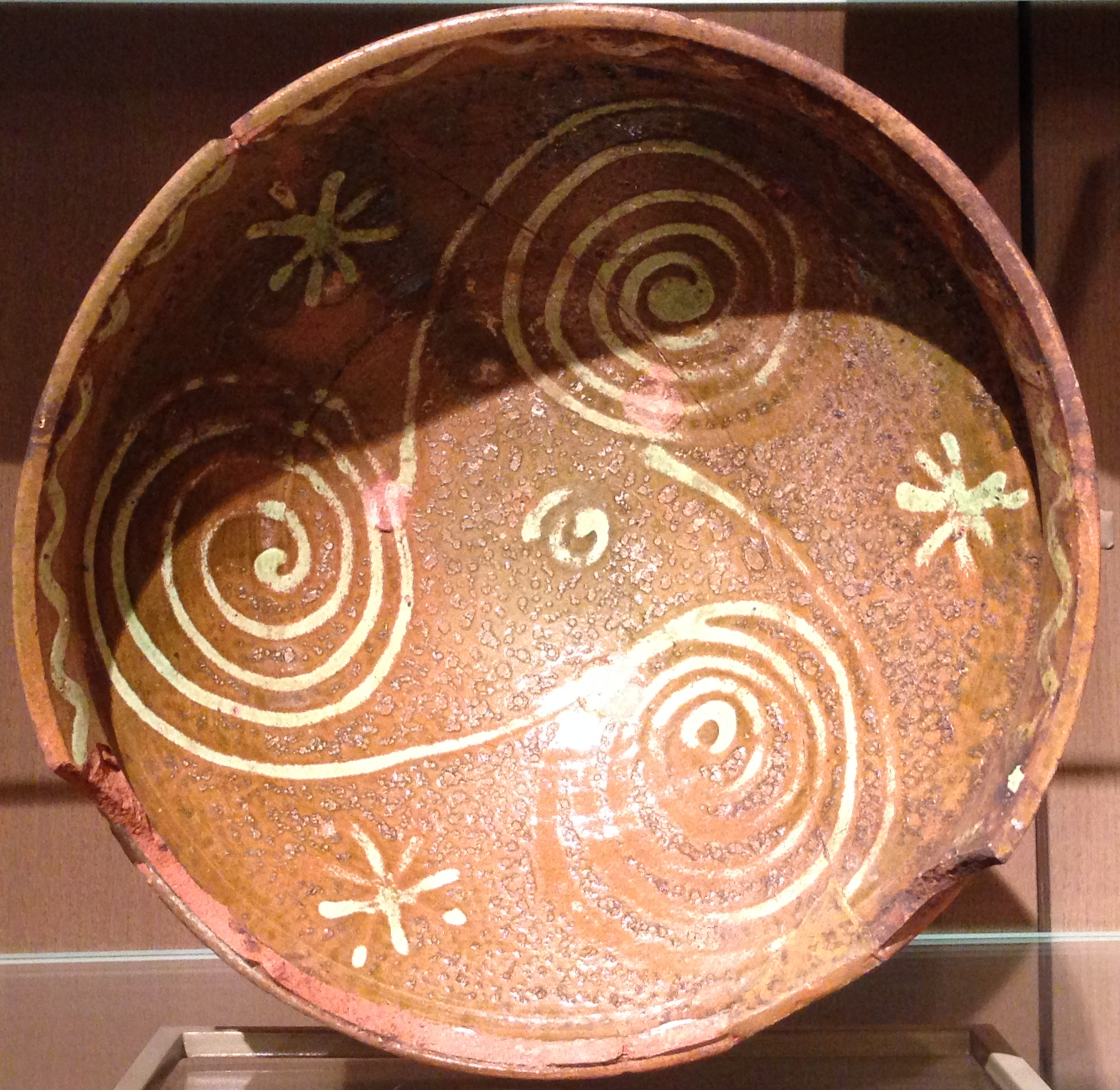
Terracotta cup from Tyre, Mamluk period, National Museum of Beirut

In the same year of Dame Margaret's retirement – in 1291 – Tyre was again taken, this time by the Mamluk Sultanate's army of Al-Ashraf Khalil. Reportedly, the whole population had evacuated the city by ship on the day that Acre as one of the last Crusader strongholds had fallen after two months of siege, so that the Mamluks found Tyre mostly empty. Amalric, the last Lord of Tyre, escaped as well.

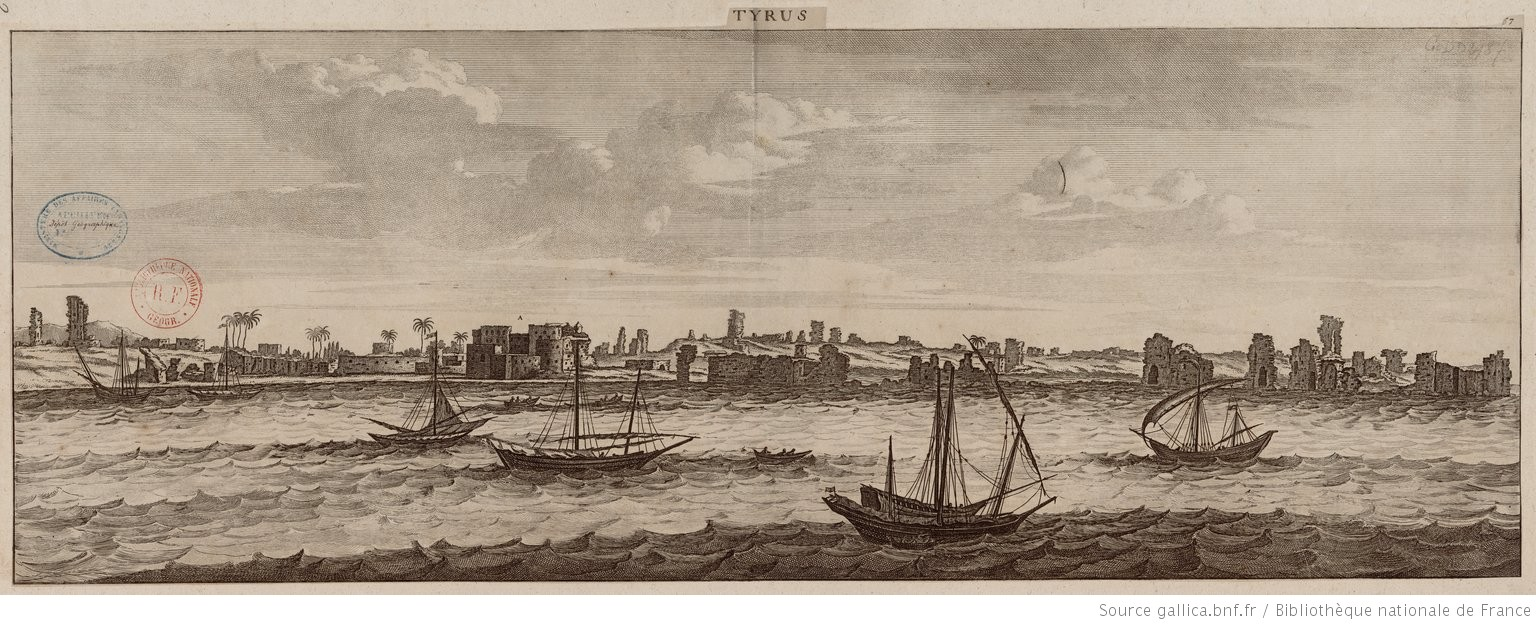
The ruins of Tyre, by Cornelis De Bruyn

Sultan Khalil had all fortifications demolished to prevent the Franks from re-entrenching. The Crusader cathedral, which had been damaged before by the 1202 earthquake, got further destroyed by the conquerors as well. The city was subsequently governed from Acre.

The traditional pottery and glassware industry in Tyre continued its production of artful objects during the early Mamluk period. However, the purple dye industry, which had been a major source of income for the city throughout its previous history, did not get started again, since new dyes entered the market that were cheaper, like for example Turkey red.

While the sultanate was rocked by factional struggles after Khalil's death in 1293 and political instability, Tyre – "the London" or "New York City" of the Old World – lost its importance and "sank into obsurity." When the Moroccan explorer Ibn Battuta visited Tyre in 1355, he found it a mass of ruins. Many stones were taken to neighbouring cities like Sidon, Acre, Beirut, and Jaffa as building materials.

In 1610, the English traveller George Sandys noted about his visit to Tyre:

This once famous Tyre is now no other than a heap of ruins; yet have they a reverent respect: and do instruct the pensive beholder with their exemplary frailty.

== Ottoman period (1516–1918) ==
=== Maan clan rule ===
The former Maan palace
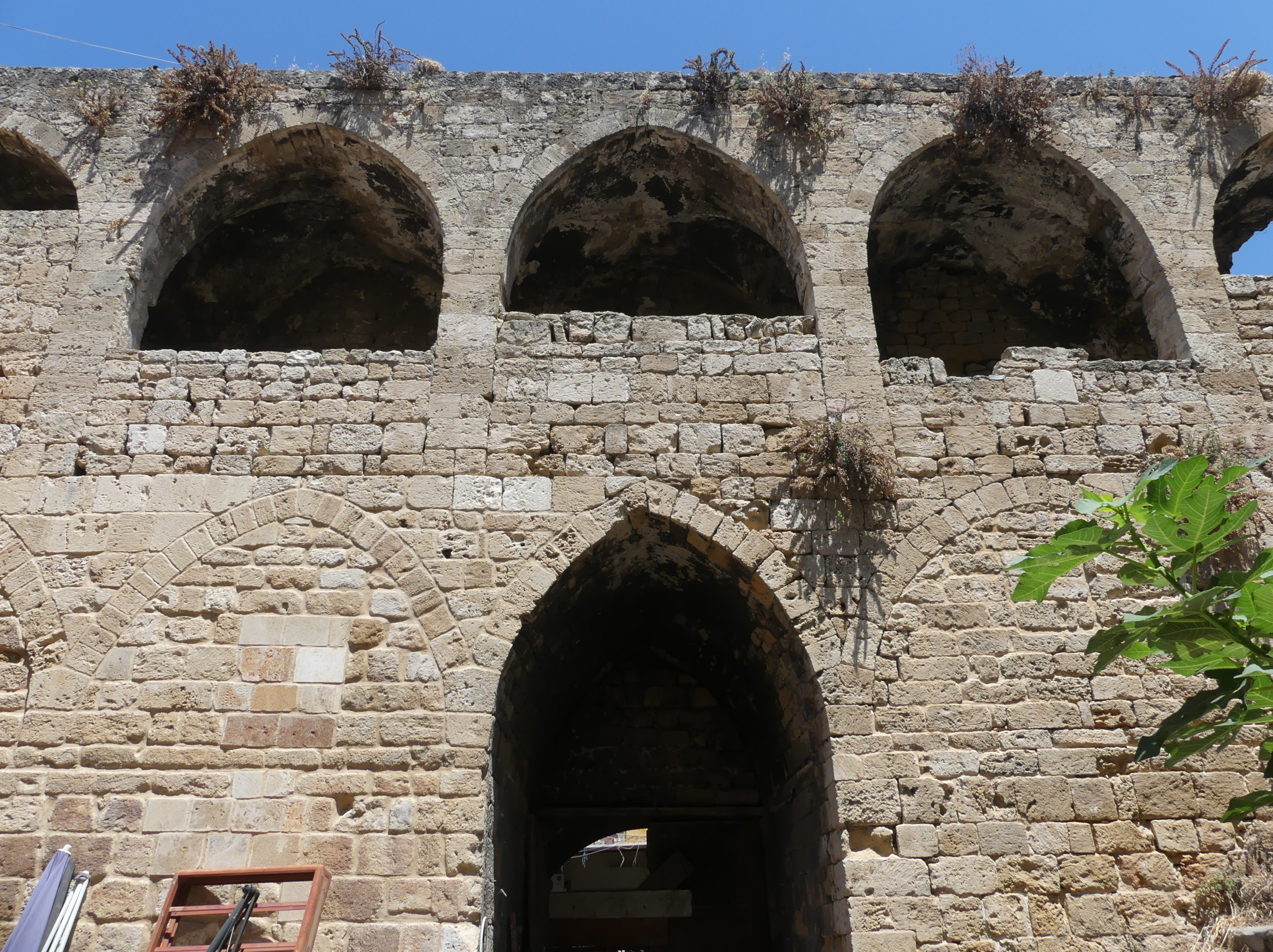
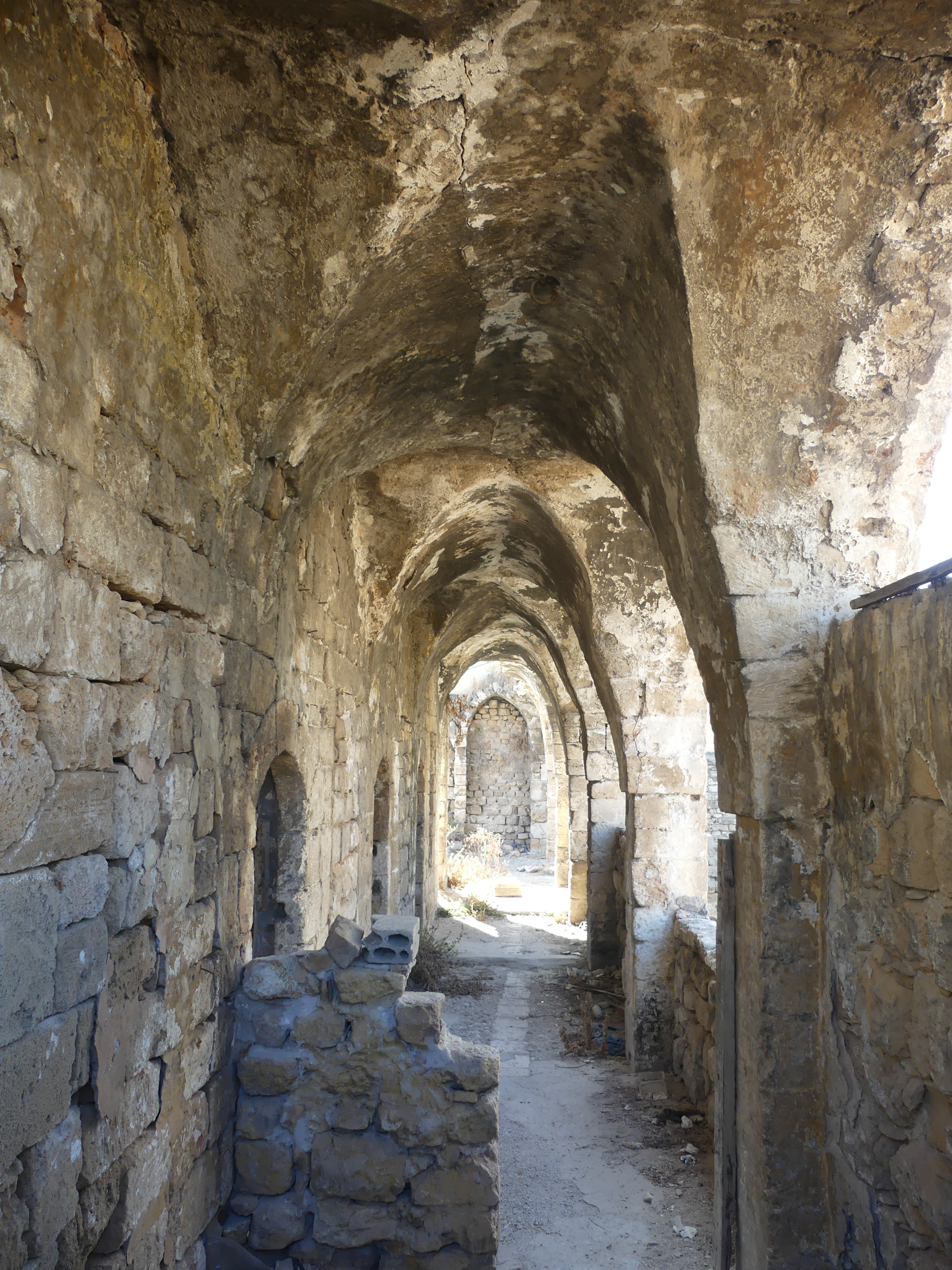

The Ottoman Empire conquered the Levant in 1516, yet Tyre remained practically untouched for another ninety years until the beginning of the 17th century, when the Ottoman leadership at the Sublime Porte appointed the Druze leader Fakhreddine II of the Maan family as emir to administer Jabal Amel (modern-day South Lebanon) and Galilee in addition to the districts of Beirut and Sidon.

One of his projects in Tyre was the construction of a residence for his brother, Prince Younis Al-Maani. Its foundations were evidently built upon ruins from the Crusader period. The ruins of the palace are still standing in the centre of today's Souk marketplace area.

Fakhreddine also encouraged Shiites and Christians to settle to the East of Tyre to secure the road to Damascus. He thus laid the foundation of modern Tyre demographics as many of those settlers – or their descendants respectively – later moved to the town. Those development efforts were overshadowed though when the Emir aspired to establish an independent state – which has been widely viewed in the public discourse as the earliest vision of Lebanon as a country.

At the core of this alliance with Florence was the plan to rebuild the harbour for naval support. In this context, he converted the remains of Tyre's former Crusader's Cathedral in 1610 into a military fortress. Notwithstanding, he was chased out by the Turkish army and went into exile in Tuscany.

In 1618, Fakhreddine (also spelled Fakhr-al-Din) returned to the Levant thanks to the removal of some of his enemies within the Ottoman regime. He then also entertained political relations with France: after a diplomatic mission sent by King Louis XIII and Cardinal Richelieu the Maani palace in Tyre "became the property of the Franciscan fathers." By 1631, Fakhreddine dominated most of Syria, Lebanon and Palestine, but the Maan era ended when Sultan Murad IV had the Druze Emir executed together with one or two of his sons in 1635 for his political ambitions.

=== Rise and rivalry of the feudal Zu'ama ===
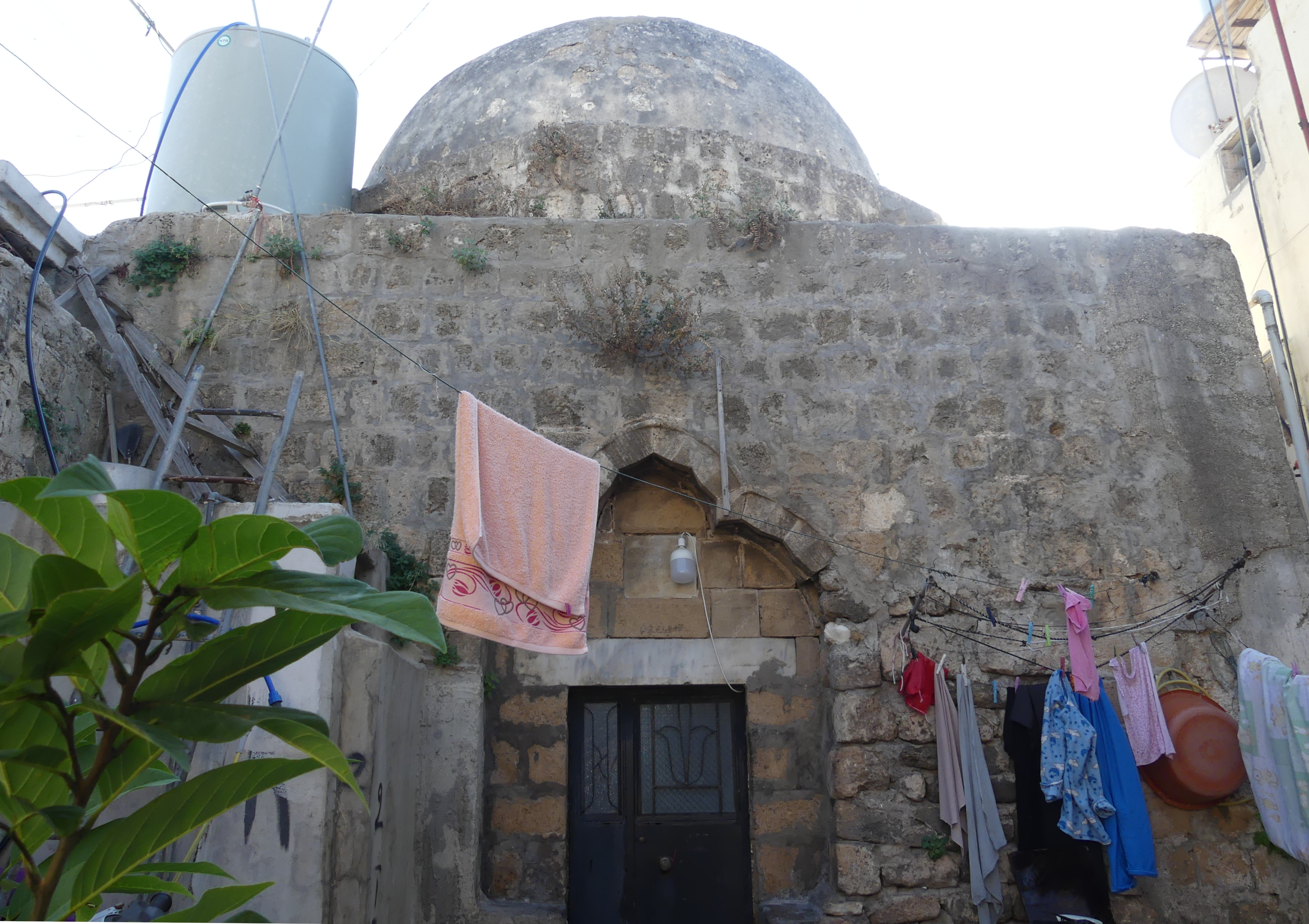
Al-Nassar's tomb in Maachouk

In the following decades, Ali al-Saghir – a leader of the discriminated Metwali, the Shia Muslims of what is now Lebanon – established a dynasty

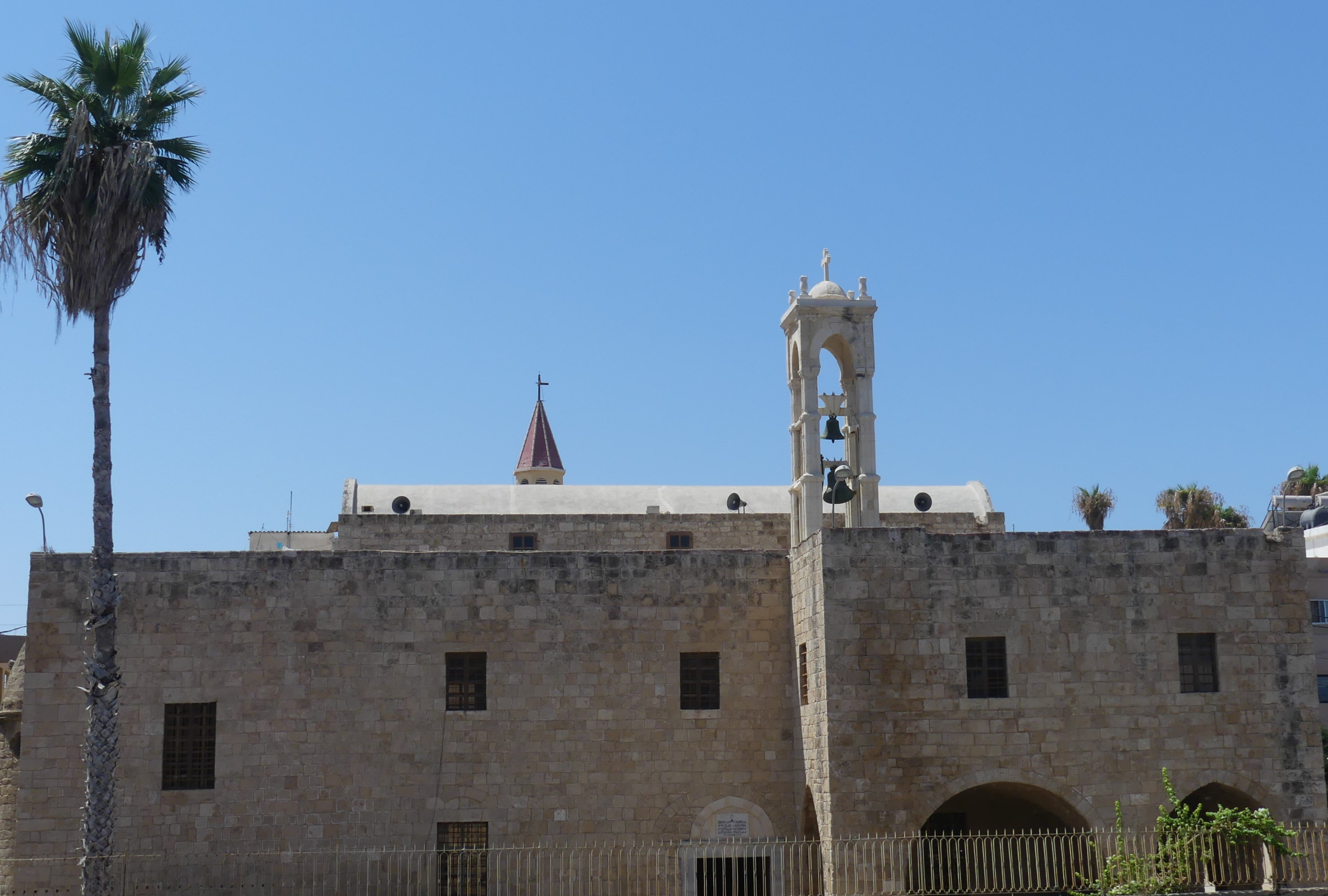
The Greek Catholic Saint Thomas Cathedral

In 1697, the English scholar Henry Maundrell visited Tyre and found only a "few" inhabitants, who mainly subsisted upon fishing. Their situation was made even worse by Tuscan, Maltese and Monégasque pirates, who would sometimes raid the Tyrian coast, as well as by heavy taxation. The hinterland of Tyre "was generally seen as a lawless country where criminals would flee to seek refuge with the Shiites."

Under these conditions, Tyre also became – at least nominally – the center of the schism within the Greek Orthodox Church of Antioch: its archbishop of Tyre and Sidon – Euthymios Saif – had been working on regaining communion with the Holy See in Rome since at least 1683. In 1701, the Congregation Propaganda Fide appointed him by secret decree to be the Apostolic Administrator of the Melkites.

In 1724, one year after Saifi's death, his nephew and student Seraphim Tanas was elected as Patriarch Cyril VI of Antioch. He quickly affirmed the union with Rome and thereby the separation from the Greek Orthodox Church. However, only a handful of Christian families actually lived in Tyre at the time. Church services were held in the ruins of Saint Thomas church near the remains of the Crusaders Cathedral.

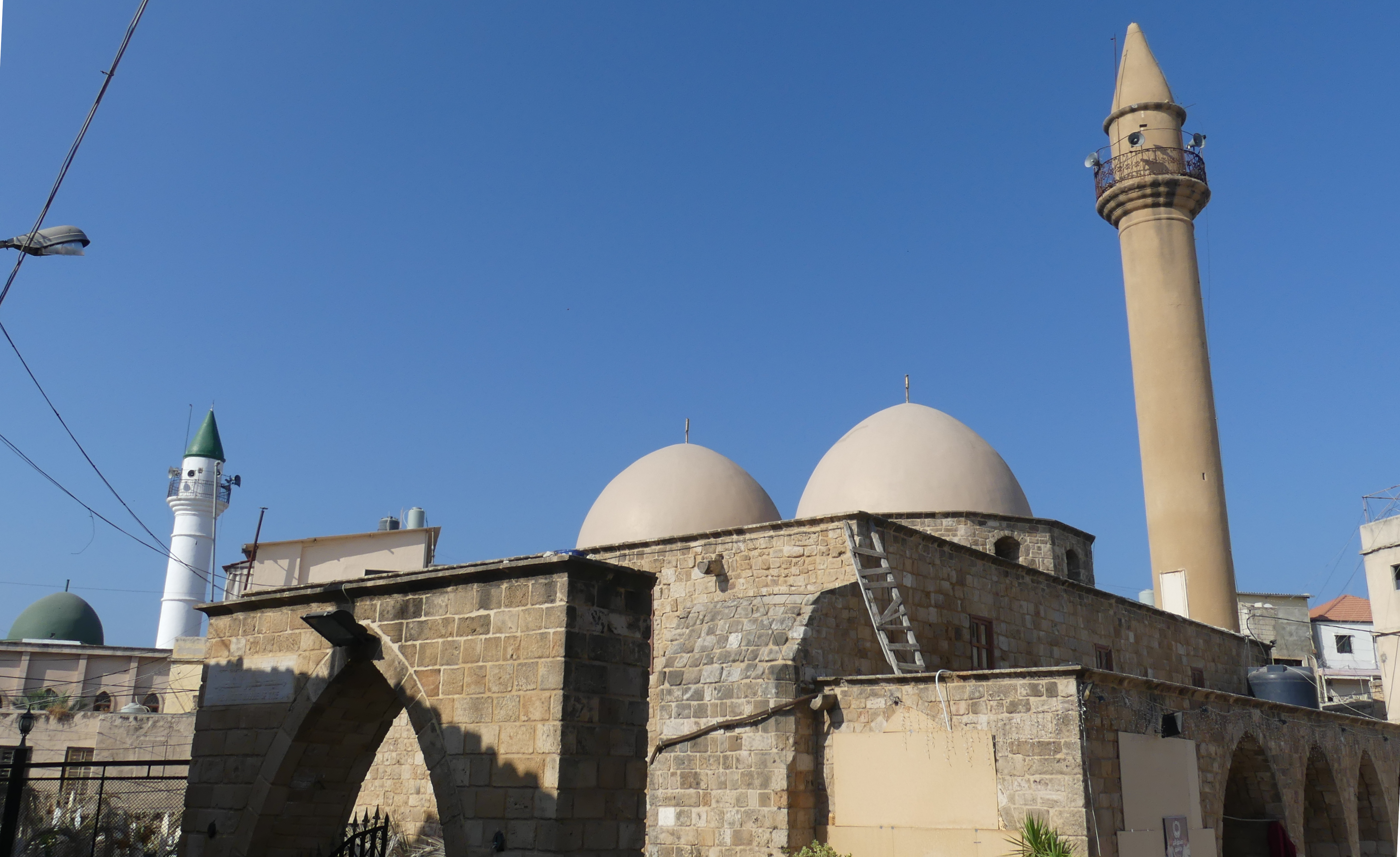
The Old Mosque (Sunna), with the minaret and one green dome of the Abdul Hussein Mosque (Shia), built in 1928, in the back left

Around 1750, Jabal Amel's ruler from the Shiite dynasty of Ali al-Saghir (see above), Sheikh Nasif al-Nassar, initiated a number of construction projects to attract new inhabitants to the almost deserted town. His representative in Tyre was the "tax-farmer and effective governor" Sheikh Kaplan Hasan. The main trade partners became French merchants, though both Hasan and Al-Nassar at times clashed with French authorities about the conditions of the commerce.

Amongst Al-Nassar's projects was a marketplace. While the former Maani palace was turned into a military garrison, Al-Nassar commissioned the Serail at the Northern port as his own headquarters, which nowadays houses the police HQ. The military Al Mobarakee Tower from the Al-Nassar era is still well-preserved, too.

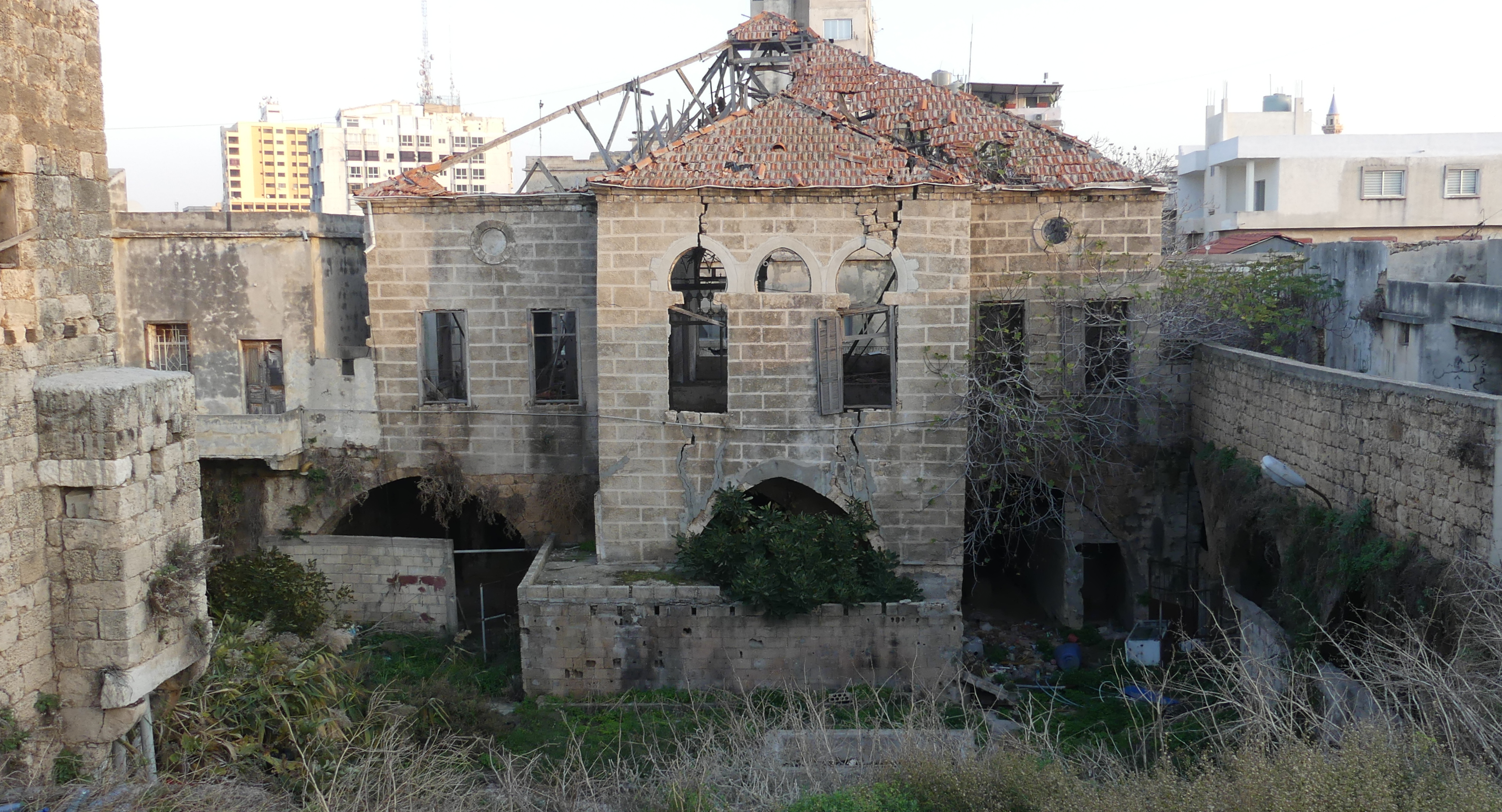
The ruins of Khan Rabu (2019)

In 1752, construction of the Melkite cathedral of Saint Thomas was started thanks to donations from a rich merchant, George Mashakka – also spelled Jirjis Mishaqa – in a place that had already housed a church during the Crusader period in the 12th century. The silk and tobacco trader had been persuaded by Al-Nassar to move from Sidon to Tyre. Numerous Greek Catholic families followed him there. Mashakka also contributed considerably to the construction of a great mosque, which is nowadays known as the Old Mosque.

However, around the same time the resurgence of Tyre suffered some backlashes: the devastating Near East earthquakes of 1759 destroyed parts of the town and killed an unknown number of people as well. In 1781, Al-Nassar was killed in a power-struggle with the Ottoman governor of Sidon, Ahmad Pasha al-Jazzar, who had the Shiite population decimated in brutal purges. Thus, the Shiite autonomy in Jabal Amel ended for a quarter-century.

At the beginning of the 19th century though, another boom period set in: in 1810 a Caravanserai was constructed near the former palace of Emir Younes Maani and the marketplace area: Khan Rabu. A Khan was "traditionally a large rectangular courtyard with a central fountain, surrounded by covered galleries". Khan Rabu (also transliterated Ribu) soon became an important commercial center.

A few years later, the former Maani Palace and military garrison was transformed into a Caravanserai Khan as well.

In 1829, another Town of Tyre was formed: in the United States of America. An early settler – Jason Smith – was "presumably" inspired by ancient Tyre when he chose the name, according to the Town Historian in the northern Seneca County of the state of New York. The town – like its Mediterranean namesake – featured an aqueduct, a part of which still exists. The Hiram Lay Cobblestone Farmhouse, which is on the National Register of Historic Places, was apparently named after the Phoenician king of Tyre.

==== Egyptian occupation (1831–1839) ====
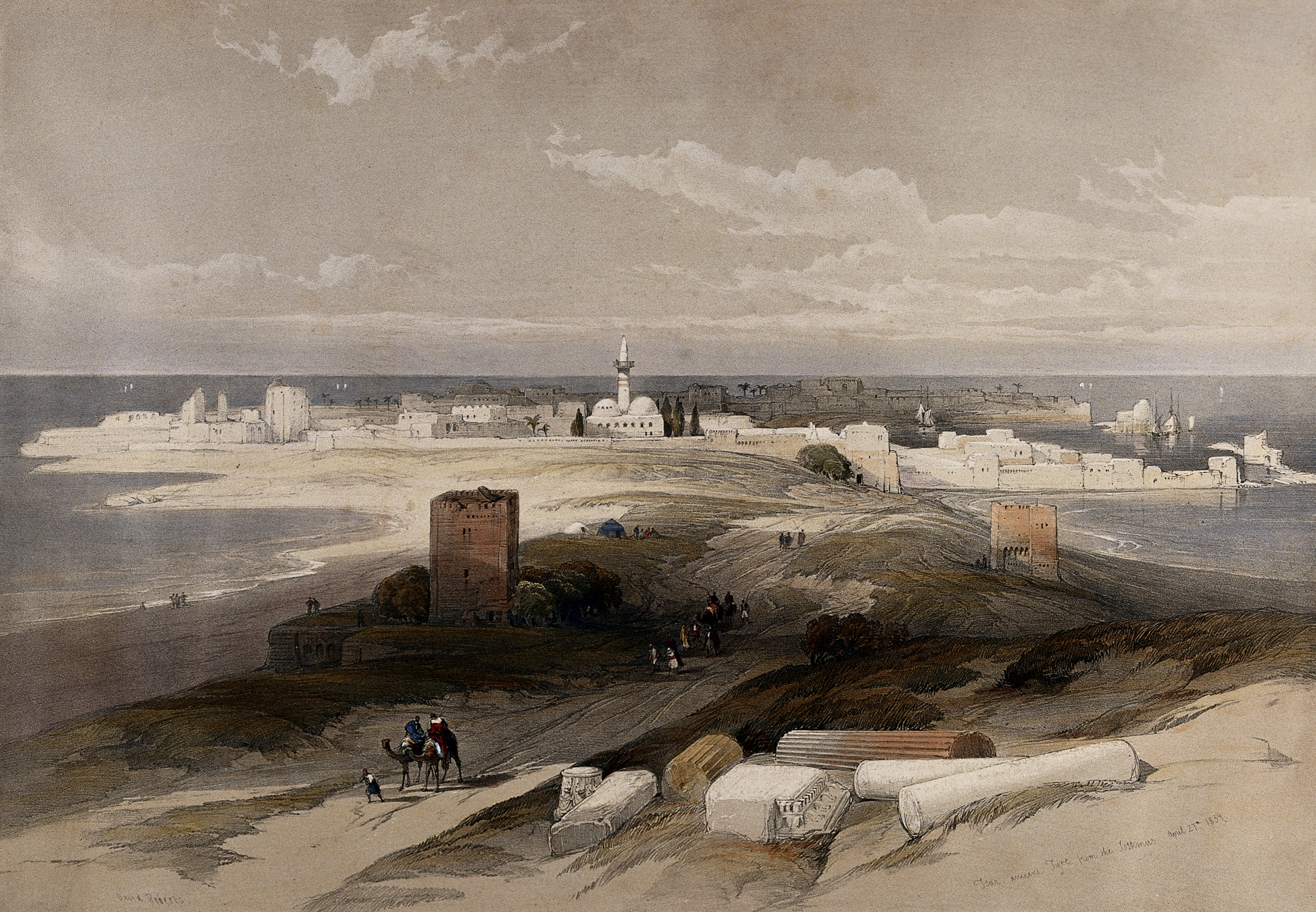
Tyre seen from the Isthmus, by Louis Haghe after an 1839 drawing by David Roberts

In December 1831 Tyre fell under the rule of Mehmet Ali Pasha of Egypt, after an army led by his son Ibrahim Pasha had entered Jaffa and Haifa without resistance. Subsequently, a number of Egyptians settled in the city, which still today features a "Street of the Egyptians" in its old town. Then, the Galilee earthquake of 1837 brought misery and destruction over Tyre.

Two years later, Shiite forces under Hamad al-Mahmud from the Ali al-Saghir dynasty (see above) rebelled against the occupation. They were supported by the British Empire and the Austrian Empire: Tyre was captured on 24 September 1839 after allied naval bombardments.

==== French influence zone (from mid-19th c. on) ====
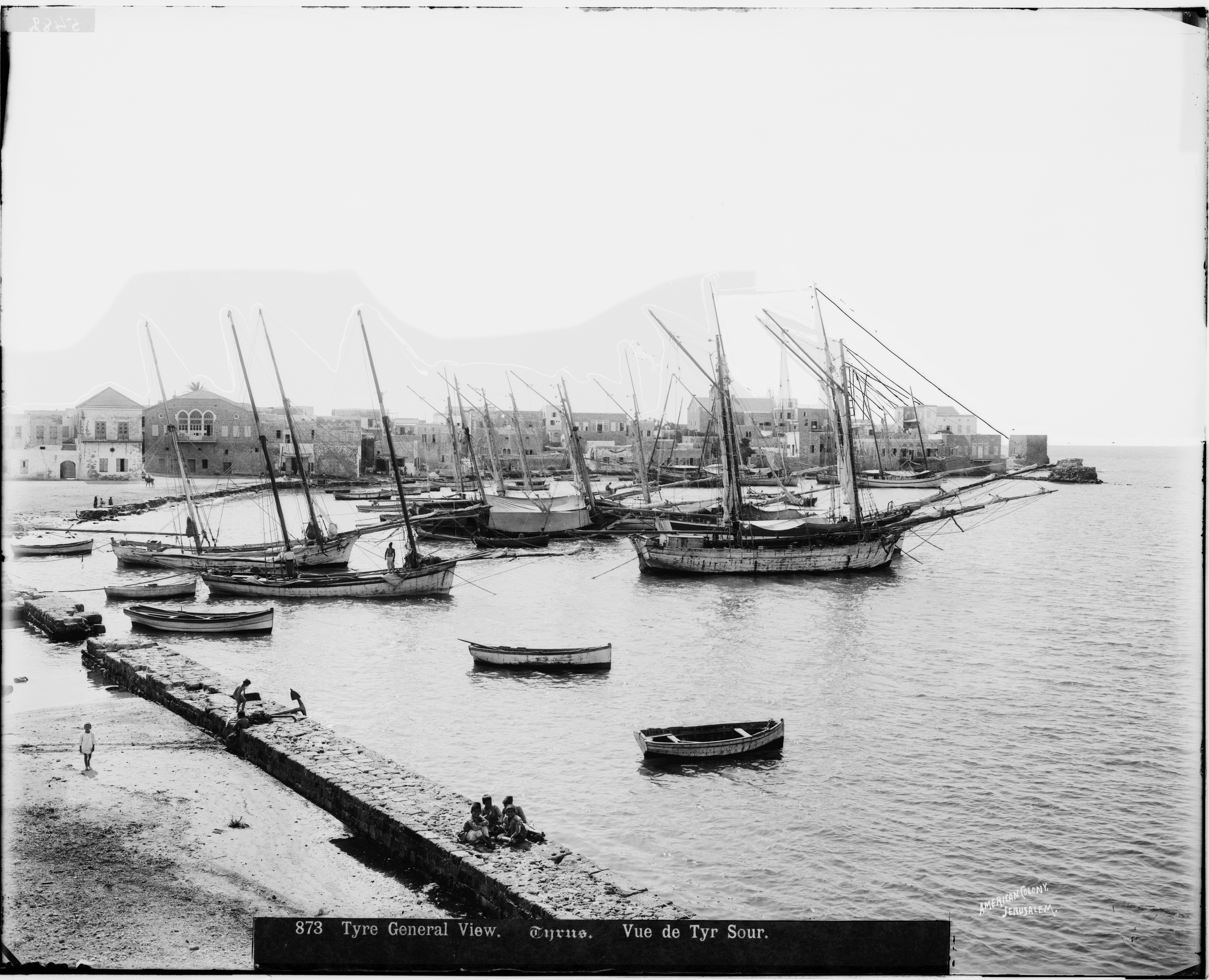
Tyre harbour pre-WWI

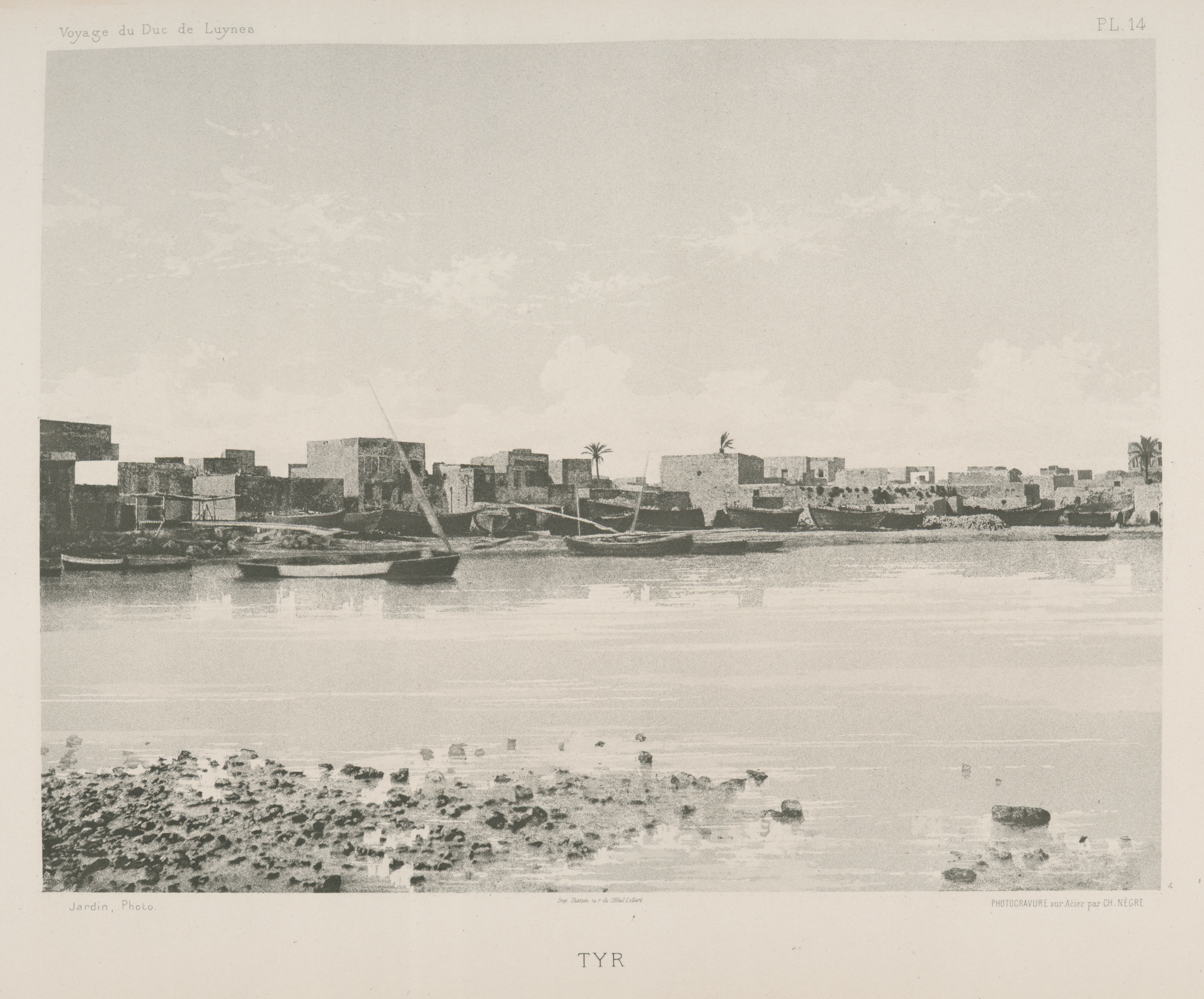
The harbour in 1874, photogravure

For their fight against the Egyptian invaders, Al-Mahmud and his successor Ali al-As'ad – a relative – were rewarded by the Ottoman rulers with the restoration of Shiite autonomy in Jabal Amel. However, in Tyre it was the Mamlouk family that gained a dominant position. Its head Jussuf Aga Ibn Mamluk was reportedly a son of the Anti-Shiite Jazzar Pasha (see above).

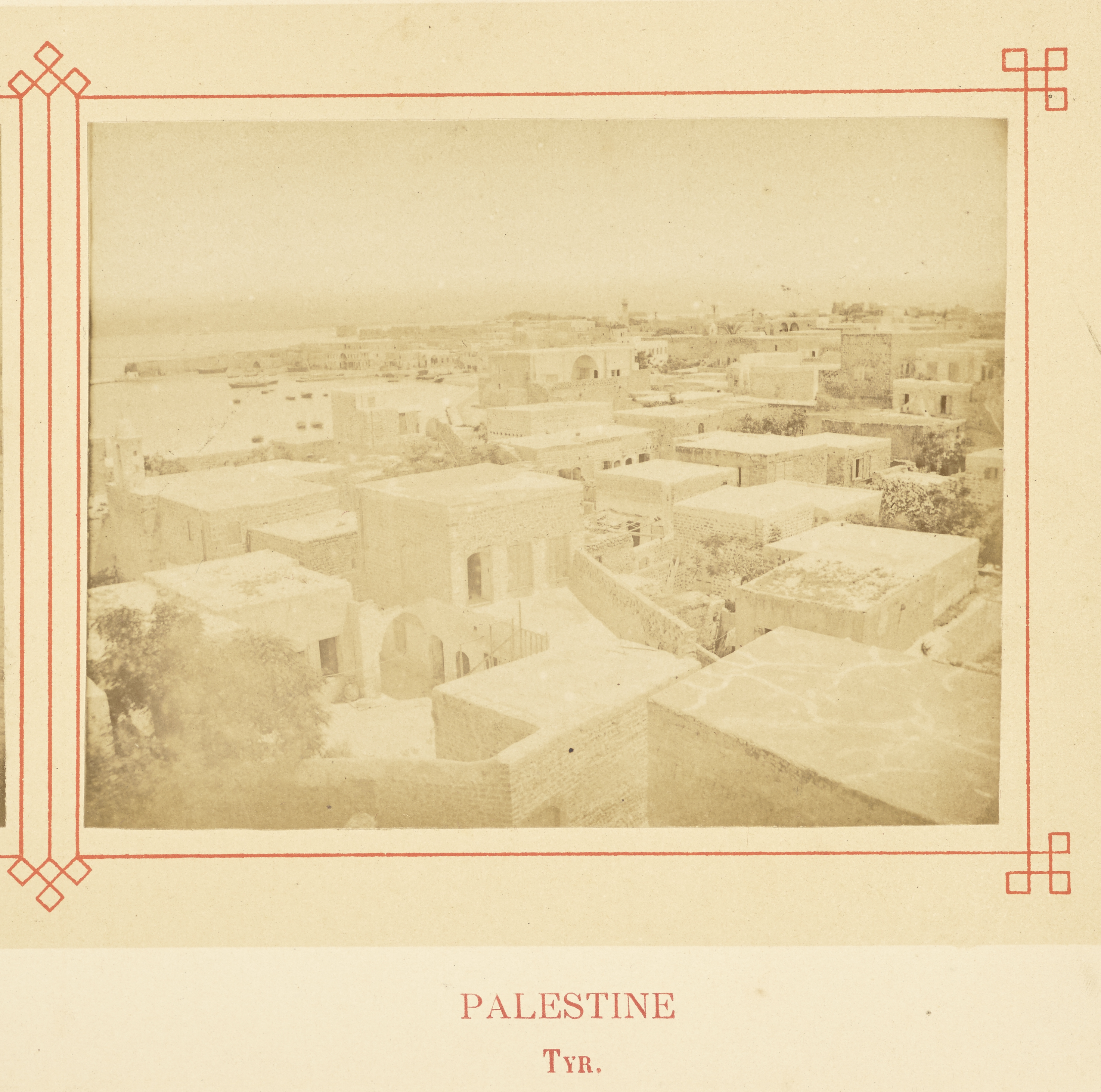
PALESTINE Tyr – ca. 1878

Meanwhile, the Egyptian occupation had opened the door for European intervention in Ottoman affairs through various Lebanese communities. Thus France under Napoleon III and its allied Maronite leaders increased their influence across Lebanon from the mid-19th century onwards.

When the Emperor of the French thus sent an expeditionary corps of some 7,000 troops to Beirut during the 1860 Mount Lebanon civil war between Druze and Maronite groups, he also commissioned first archaeological excavations in Tyre that were undertaken by Ernest Renan. After his departure irregular digging activities disturbed the historical sites. In the same year, the Greek-Orthodox church of Saint Thomas was consecrated near the Greek-Catholic Saint Thomas Cathedral. Around the same time, the Latin-Catholic church of the Holy Land was established by the Franciscan order.

In 1865, Jabal Amel's ruler Ali al-As'ad died after a power struggle with his cousin Thamir al-Husain.

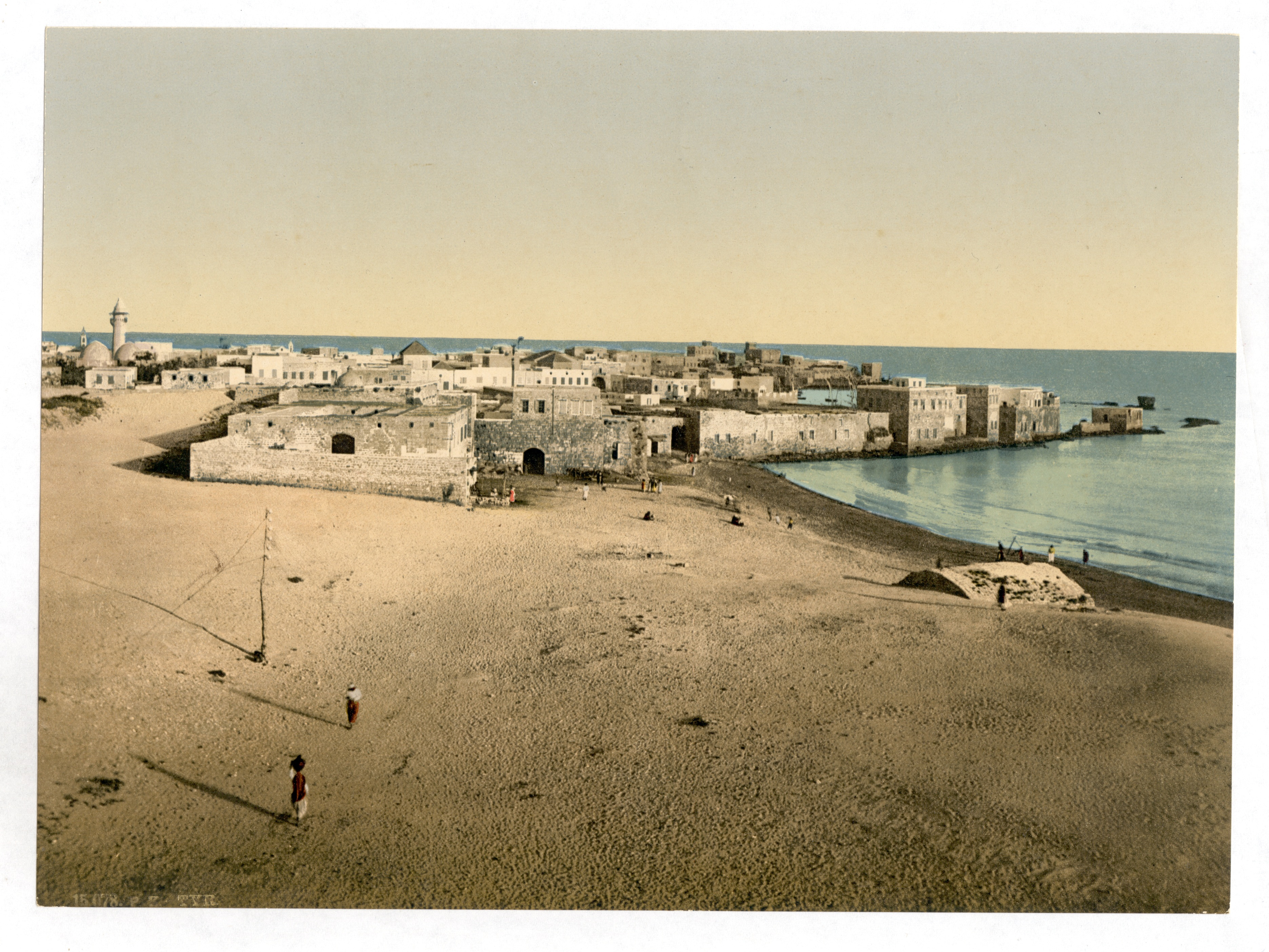
1890–1900, Photochrom print

In 1874, the Bavarian historian and politician Johann Nepomuk Sepp led a mission to Tyre to search for the bones of Frederick Barbarossa. The expedition had the approval of Otto von Bismarck, Chancellor of the German Empire, and openly pursued ambitions to establish a German colony. While Sepp and his team failed to discover Barbarossa's remains, they did excavate the ruins of the Crusader cathedral and took a number of archaeological findings to Berlin where they were exhibited. For their excavations, Sepp and his team had some 120 people evicted, though with some compensation, with the support of local authorities.

According to Sepp, Tyre had some 5,000 inhabitants in 1874. A traveller from the US, who visited Tyre around the same time put the number at a maximum of 4,000, about half of them Shiites and half Catholic Christians, with "a sprinkling of Protestants". In 1882, the Sisters of Saint Joseph of the Apparition founded a school at the Western seaside of the Christian quarter.

Meanwhile, the 1858 Ottoman Land reforms led to the accumulated ownership of large tracts of land by a few families at the expense of the peasants. While the Al-As'ad descendants of the rural Ali al-Saghir dynasty expanded their fief holdings as the provincial leaders in Jabal Amel, another power player rose from the urban class of the mercantilist notables (Wujaha) to the rank of Zu'ama (feudal landlords) in Tyre:

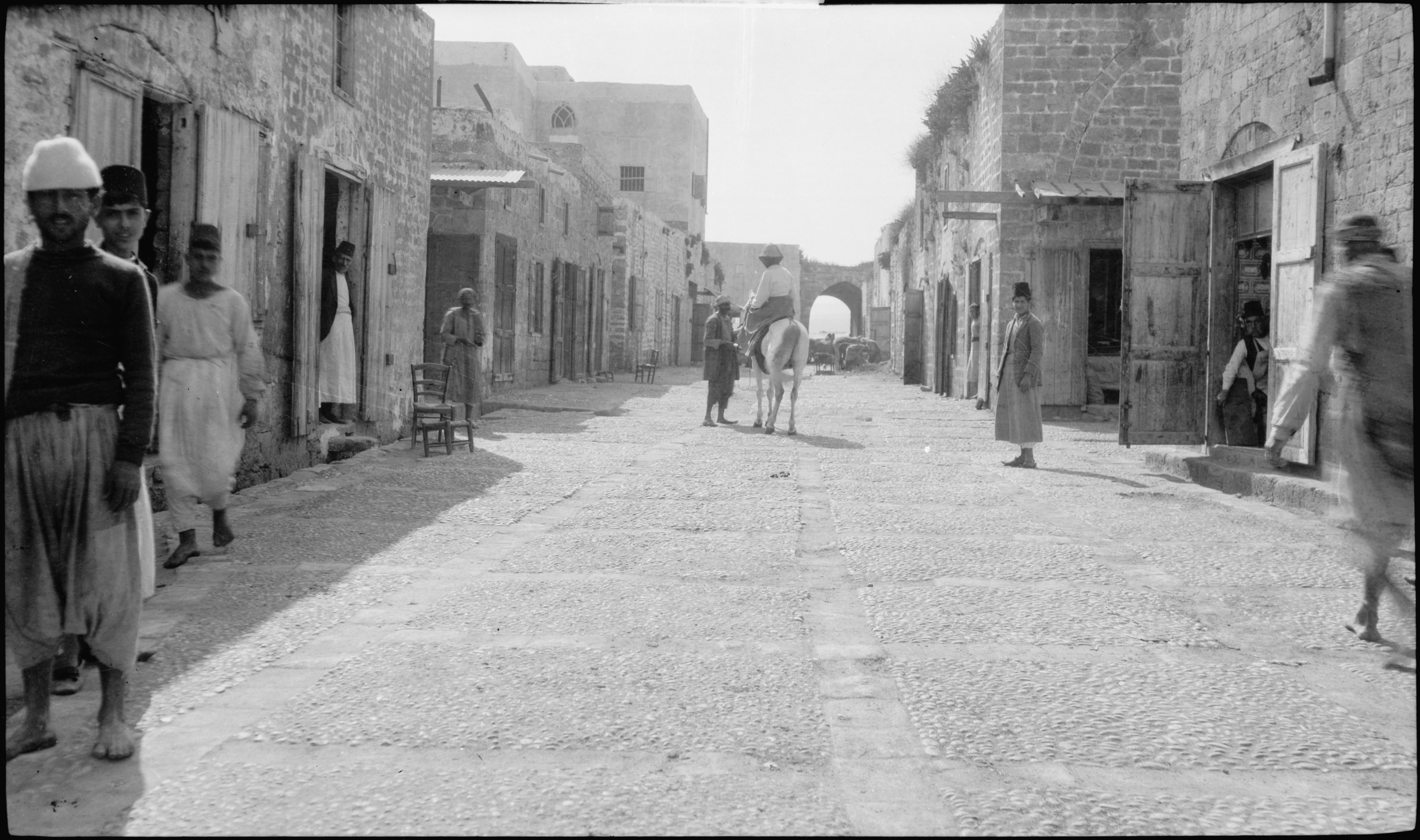
A street in Tyre around 1900

The grain merchant al-Khalil family would go on to play a dominant role in the city for more than a century. It was reportedly a branch of one of the main dynasties in Jabal Amel, the Zayn family in Nabatieh, and connected to another feudal clan, the Sidon-based Osseirans, by marriage.

As a result of this mass-impoverishment, many inhabitants of Tyre and Jabal Amil emigrated in the 1880s to West Africa.

In 1906, construction of the Maronite cathedral of Our Lady of the Seas near the modern harbour was finished. It was built on the foundations of an older church.

The 1908 Young Turk Revolution and its call for elections to an Ottoman parliament triggered a power-struggle in Jabal Amel: on the one hand side Rida al-Sulh of a Sunni dynasty from Sidon, which had sidelined the Shia Al-As'ad clan of the Ali al-Saghir dynasty (see above) in the coastal region with support from leading Shiite families like the al-Khalil clan in Tyre. His opponent was Kamil Al-As'ad from the Ali al-Saghir dynasty that still dominated the hinterland. The latter won that round of the power-struggle, but the political rivalry between al-Khalil and Al-As'ad would go on to be a main feature of Lebanese Shia politics for the next sixty years.

By that time, Tyre had a population of about 2,800 Shi'ites, 2,700 Christians and 500 Sunnis. In the district of Tyre there were altogether some 40,000 Shi'ites and 8,000 Christians.

==== World War I ====
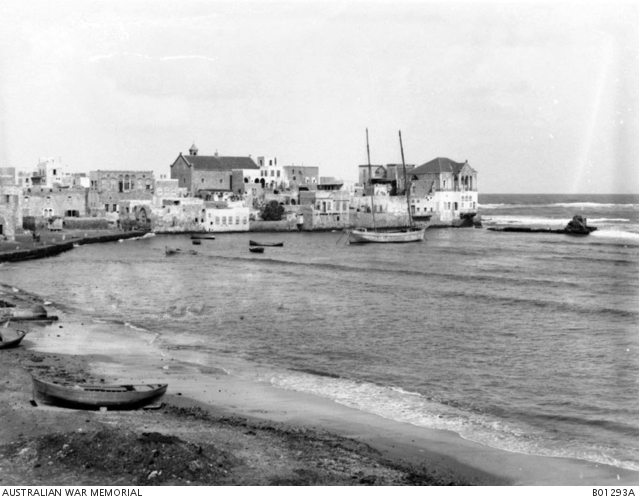
The harbour around 1918

At the beginning of the First World War in 1914, many Shiites in Jabal Amel were conscripted and thus had to leave their farms. One year later famine struck as locusts devastated the fields. This triggered another wave of emigration to Africa and also to the US. As opposition to the Turkish rulers grew across the Levant, Arab nationalism was on the rise in Jabal Amel as well. However, in March 1915 the Ottoman authorities launched a new wave of repressions and arrested a number of activists of the Decentralisation Party in Tyre as in other cities like Sidon, Nabatiya, and Beirut. Some of them were executed.

Also in 1915, Abdel Karim al-Khalil – the leader of the al-Khalil clan, who were the Tyrian allies of the al-Sulh dynasty from Sidon – was executed by the Ottoman regime "at the instigation" of Kamil al-As'ad from the rival Ali al-Saghir dynasty, some believed.

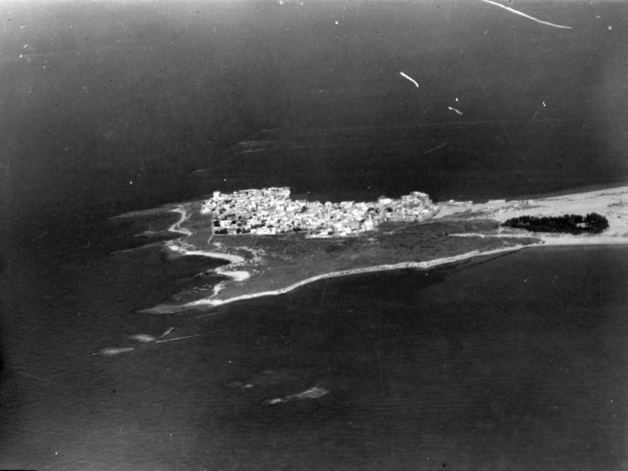
Aerial photo, c. 1918

Still in 1915, fighting reached Tyre: in November of that year, four locals spying for the French intelligence were reportedly captured in Tyre and two of them executed in Beirut. The French Navy in retaliation shelled Tyre's harbour. In September 1918, following the British victory at the Battle of Megiddo over the Ottoman Yildirim Army Group, the latter's remnants were forced to withdraw towards Damascus. The commander of the Egyptian Expeditionary Force General Edmund Allenby ordered his infantry and corps cavalry to capture the ports of Beirut and Tripoli to supply his forces in their Pursuit to Haritan of the retreating Ottoman troops.

Tyre was a strategic supply post on this route. Within three days, the second column of the British Indian Army's 7th (Meerut) Division paved the way across the Ladder of Tyre by expanding the narrow track over the steep cliff. Meanwhile, the XXI Corps Cavalry Regiment comprising one squadron Duke of Lancashire Yeomanry and two squadrons of 1/1st Hertfordshire Yeomanry advanced quickly and arrived in Tyre on 4 October. On their way they encountered "few if any Turkish troops". Three days supplies were delivered by the Royal Navy to the port of Tyre for the infantry columns on their way north first to Sidon and then to Beirut.

== Pan-Arab Kingdom of Syria vs. French-British OETA (1918–1920) ==
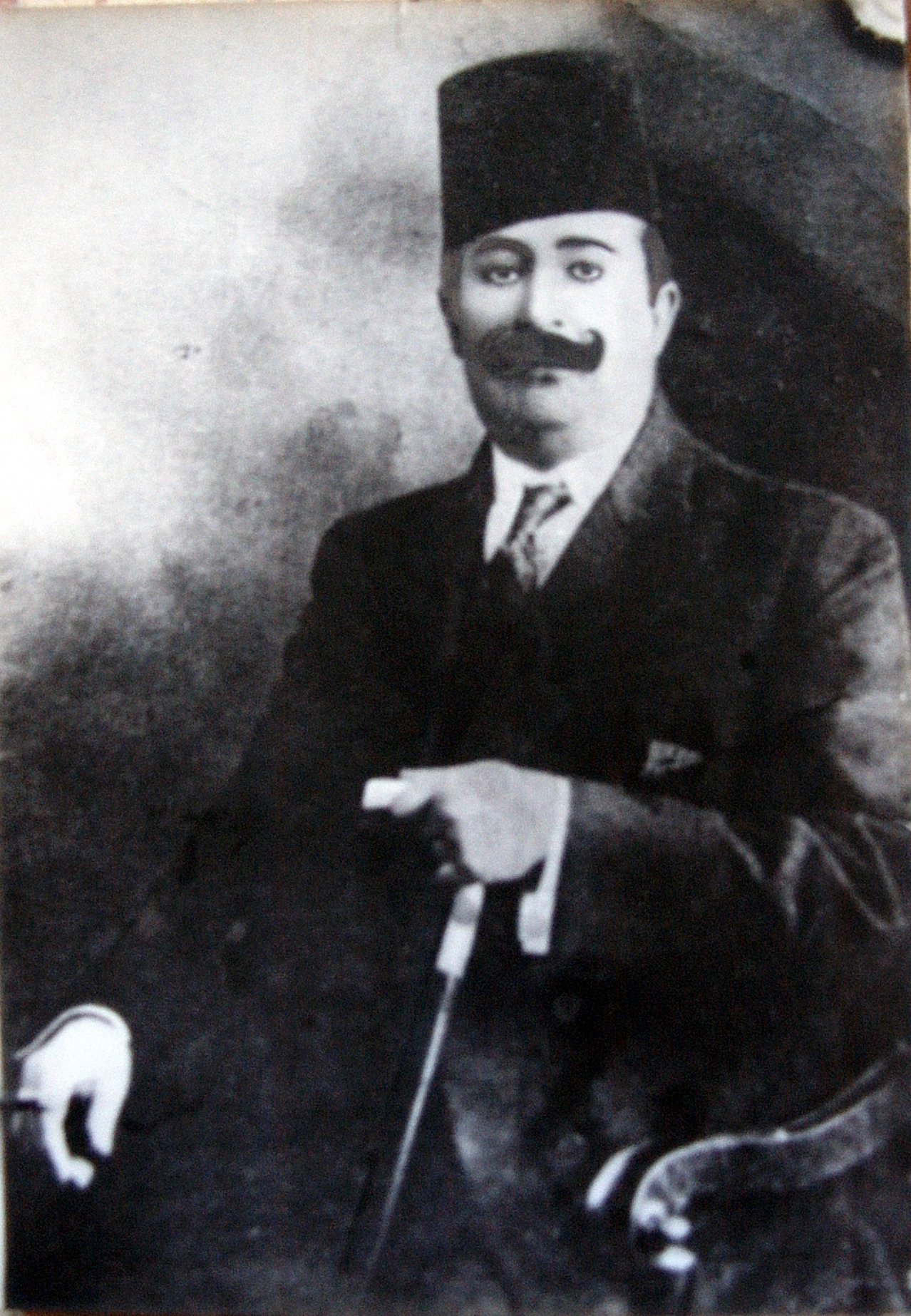
Kamil al-As'ad

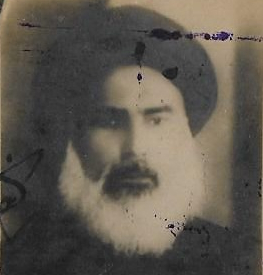
Sayed Abdul Hussein Sharafeddin

After the Arab Revolt against the Ottoman rule started in 1916 and the Sharifian Army conquered the Levant in 1918 with support from the British Empire, the Jamal Amil feudal leader Kamil al-As'ad of the Ali al-Saghir dynasty, who had been an Ottomanist before, declared the area – including Tyre – part of the Arab Kingdom of Syria on 5 October 1918. However, the pro-Damascus regime in Beirut appointed Riad al-Sulh as governor of Sidon who in turn appointed Abdullah Yahya al-Khalil in Tyre as the representative of Faisal I.

While the feudal lords of the As'ad / Ali al-Saghir and Sulh dynasties competed for power, their support for the Arab Kingdom put them immediately into conflict with the interests of the French colonial empire: on 23 October 1918, the joint British and French military regime of the Occupied Enemy Territory Administration (OETA) was declared, with Jabal Amel falling under French control. Subsequently, the French Army used the historical garrison building of Khan Sour as a base, which had been taken over as property by the Melkite Greek Catholic Archeparchy of Tyre from the Franciscan Fathers. In reaction, a guerrilla group started military attacks on French troops and pro-French elements in Tyre and the neighbouring areas, led by Sadiq al-Hamza from the Ali al-Saghir clan.

In contrast, the most prominent organiser of nonviolent resistance against the French ambitions in Jabil Amil became the Shi'a Twelver Islamic scholar Sayyid Abdel Hussein Sharafeddine, the Imam of Tyre. Thus he became the leading supporter of a Greater Syria with Faisal as king, while al-As'ad "waivered, waiting to see how events would turn out." When the King-Crane Commission of the US government visited the region in 1919, Sharafeddin asked for US-support.

In early 1920, Sharafeddin led a Shia delegation to Damascus to make the case for unity with Syria. At the same time tensions between Shia and Maronite groups in Jabal Amel increased, while Sharafeddin and al-As'ad promoted a pacifist approach and de-escalation, though many French reports blamed the attacks by armed Shiites on Sharafeddin's financing and encouragement.

When in April 1920 violent clashes took place in Jabal Amel between armed Shia and Maronite groups, many Christians living in the hinterland of Jabal Amel had fled to Tyre. A French colonial army assisted by Maronite volunteers then crushed the Shia rebellion. Tyre, which was under siege by the insurgents, and its population suffered from Bombardments by French warplanes and artillery.

== French Mandate colonial rule (1920–1943) ==
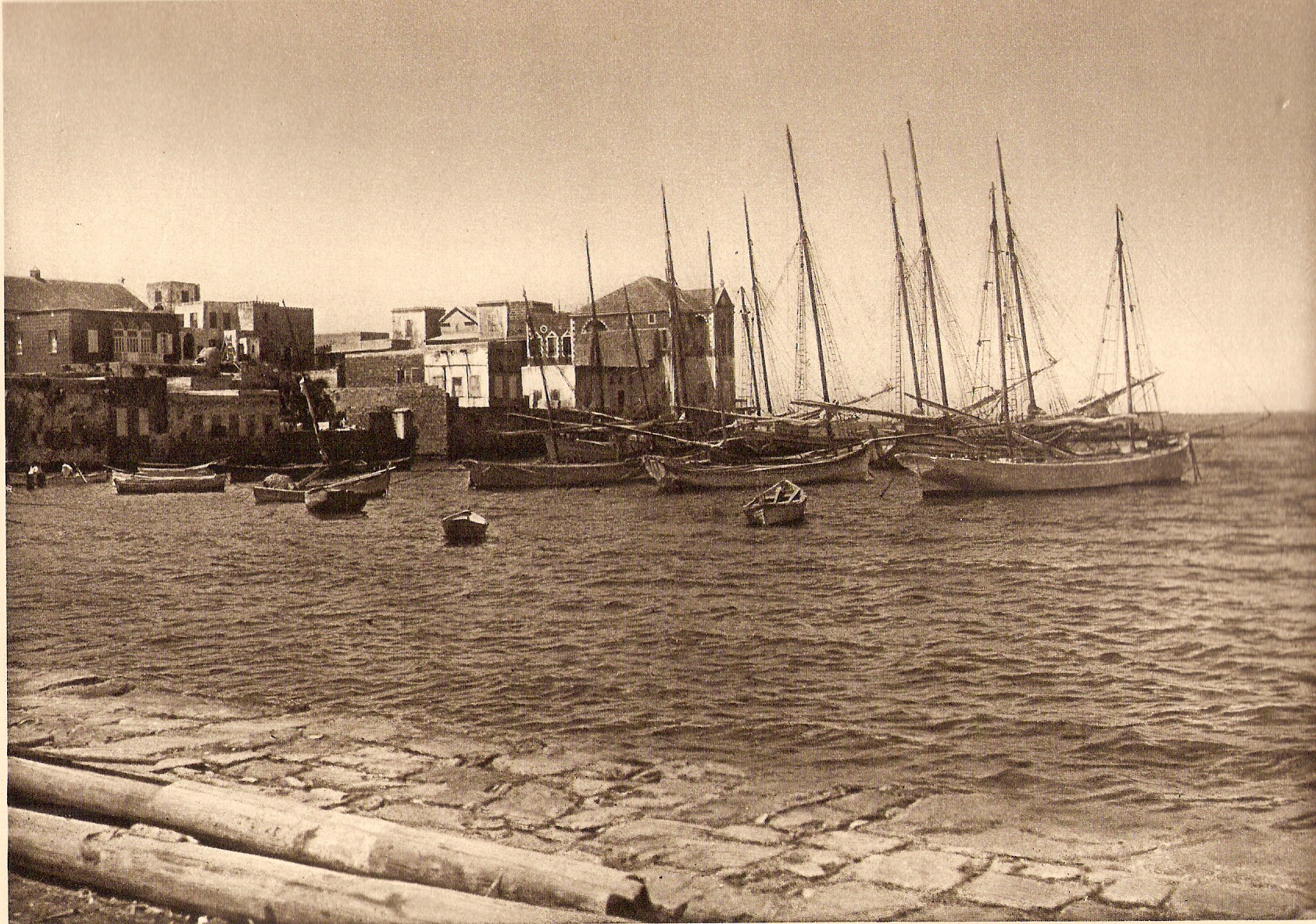
The harbour around 1925

On the first of September 1920, the new State of Greater Lebanon was proclaimed, under the guardianship of the League of Nations represented by France. The French High Commissioner in Syria and Lebanon became General Henri Gouraud. Tyre and the Jabal Amel were attached as the Southern part of the Mandate.

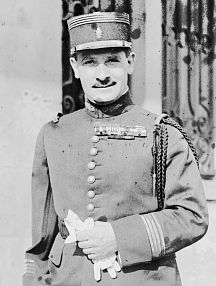
Zinovi Pechkoff in 1926

Still in 1920, the first municipality of Tyre was founded, which was headed by Ismail Yehia Khalil from the Shia feudal dynasty of al-Khalil. The al-Khalil family had traditionally been allies of the al-Sulh clan, whereas Imam Sharafeddin supported the rival al-Asa'ad clan of the Ali al-Saghir dynasty since 1908 (see above). As the most prominent opponent of the French regime, Sharafeddin was forced to flee the city. His home in Tyre was looted by French soldiers, his books and manuscripts were confiscated, another home in a neighboring village was burned. He fled to Damascus, but had to quit that city for Egypt and then for a brief stay several months in Palestine before he was allowed to return to his base in Tyre.

Meanwhile, the common people in Tyre and all of Southern Lebanon suffered from high taxes and fines imposed on their economy to punish them for the failed rebellion. In addition, the mandate regime forcibly diverted agricultural products from Southern Lebanon to Syria and thus massively reduced trade activity in the port of Tyre. Driven out by mass-poverty, emigration from Tyre via Marseille to Western Africa reached another peak. This trend was only curbed when the French rulers in Africa imposed stricter controls on immigration at the end of the 1920s.

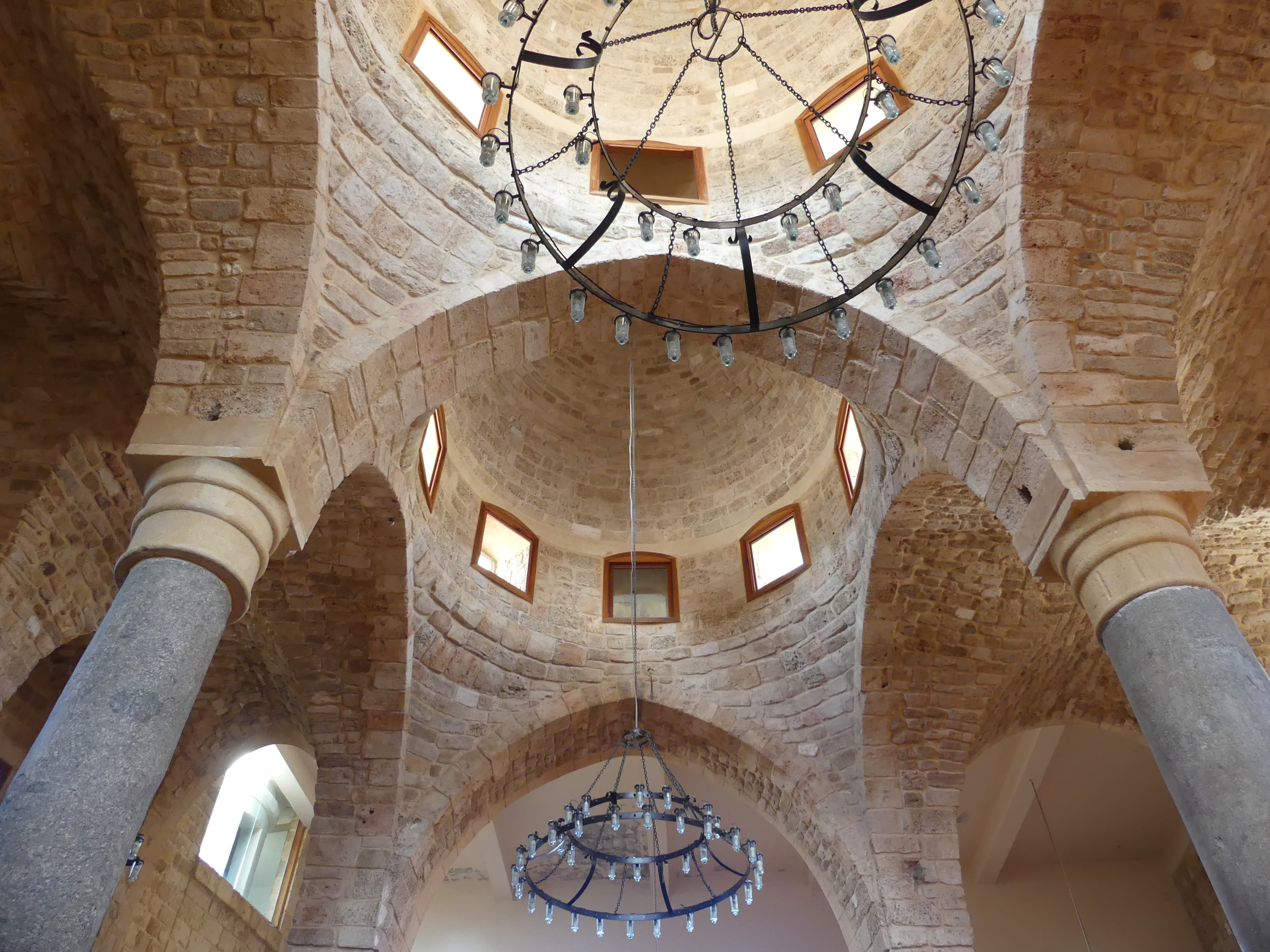
The ancient red granite columns in the Abdul Hussein mosque, 2019

In 1922, Kamil al-As'ad returned from exile and started an uprising against the French regime, but was quickly suppressed and died in 1924. In contrast, Imam Sharafeddin reached "rapprochement" with the regime and entertained friendly relations with the military governor of South Lebanon, the Russian-born Zinovi Pechkoff, who had been a protégé of writer Maxim Gorky. Sharafeddin would regularly invite him as guest of honour to religious events in Tyre.

The Imam thus resurged as the most defining character for the peaceful development of Tyre in the first half of the 20th century. While he succeeded his rival Khalil as head of the municipal council until 1926, he first and foremost changed the city and its hinterland by becoming a social reformer and "activist".

In 1926, the mandate regime officially recognised the Shia Ja'fari jurisprudence and subsequently – like in other cities – a Ja'fari tribunal opened in Tyre. It was headed by Sheikh Mughniya throughout the Mandate period. Most visibly though, the first Shi'a mosque in Tyre was constructed in 1928, using local traditional architecture and centered around two Roman granite columns. It was named Abdel Hussein Mosque after Sharafeddine.

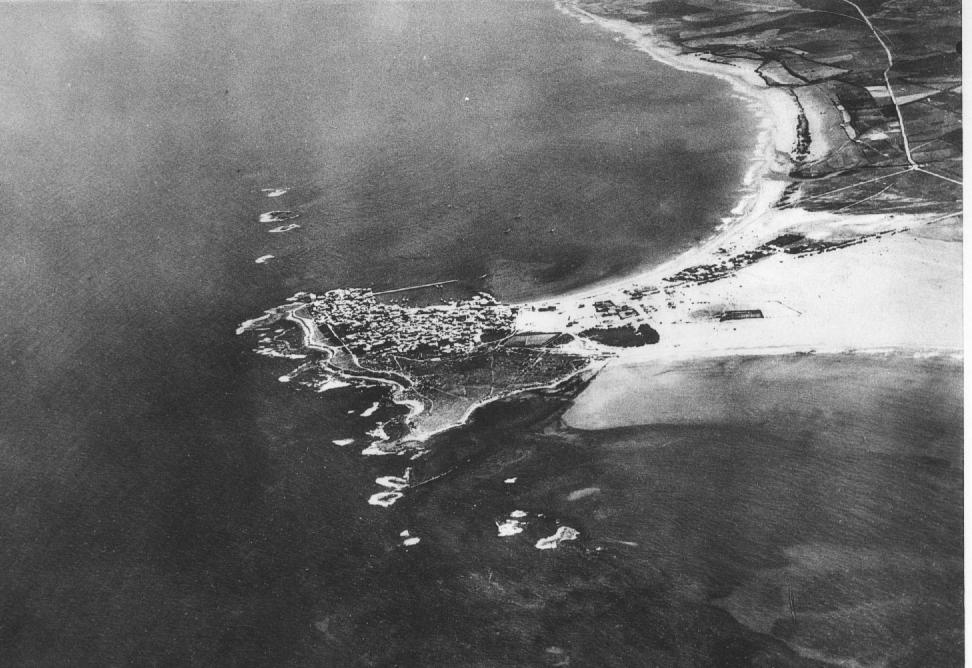
French Air Force photo, early 1930s

Yet despite Sharafeddine's efforts, the colonial appointments policy led to the fact that "almost all" of the particularly sensitive positions in the Tyre municipality and government were held by the Christian Salim family, which was headed by Yusuf Salim, a former deputy and the vice-director of La Compagnie des Eaux de Beyrouth.

According to the 1921 census, 83% of Tyre's population were Shiites, 4% Sunni, and some 13% Christians. The Mandatory regime did little though to correct this gross under-representation of the Shia majority, but instead gave Shiite feudal families like al-As'ad and Khalil "a free hand in enlarging their personal fortunes and reinforcing their clannish powers".

In 1936, the colonial authorities set up a camp for Armenian refugees in Rashidieh on the coast, five kilometres south of Tyre city. One year later, another one was constructed in the El Bass area of Tyre. Survivors of the Armenian genocide had started arriving in Tyre already in the early 1920s. A branch of the Armenian General Benevolent Union was founded there in 1928.

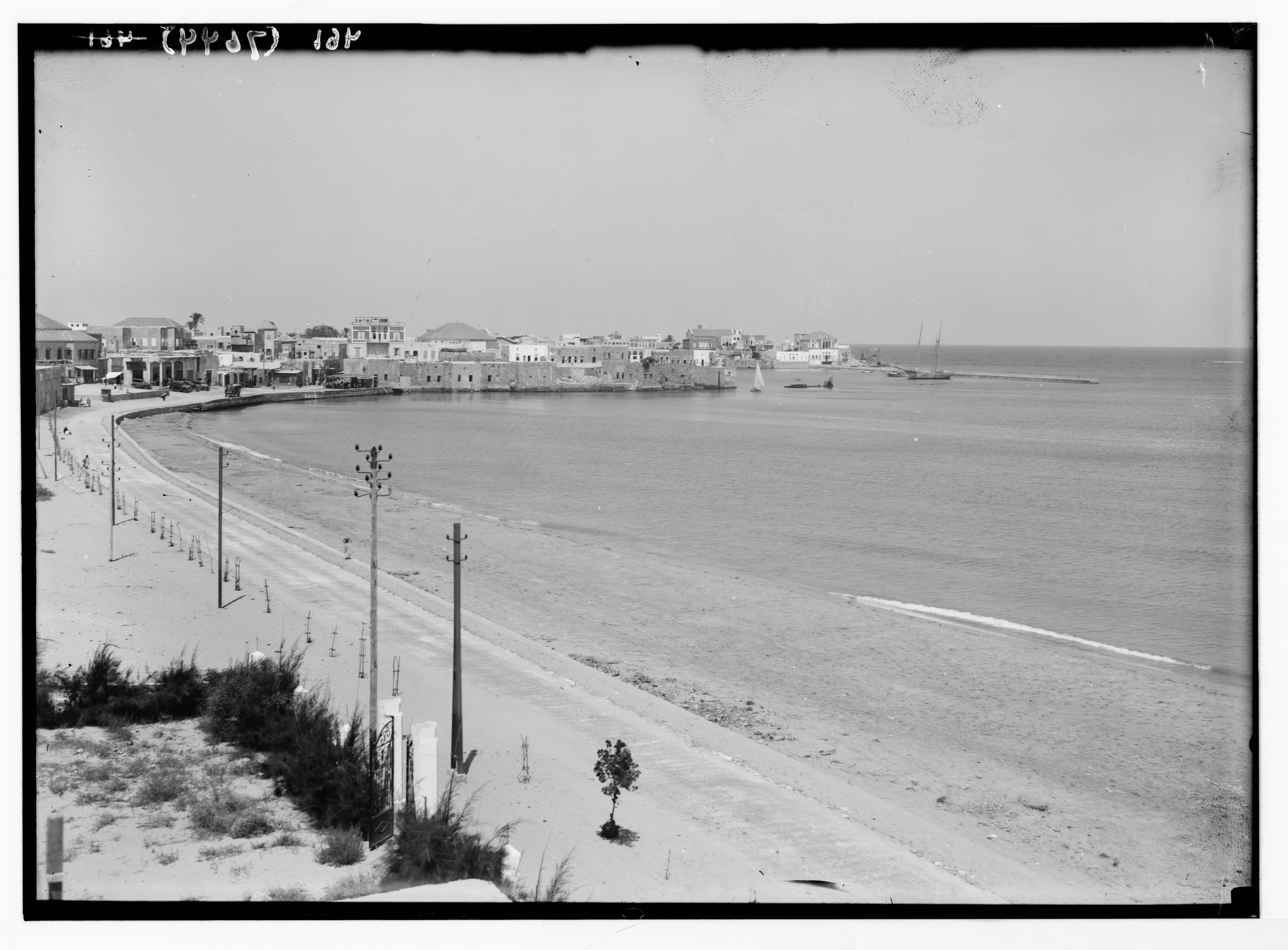
The Northern shore in 1936

A historical turning point was seen in 1938, when Imam Sharafeddine founded a school for girls and boys. He pledged his private house to build the school, against the opposition of the feudal al-Khalil family. It soon expanded, also thanks to donations from the As'ad clan. Whereas Christians had been benefitting from missionary schools, education for the Shia community was poor before the establishment of the Jafariya School. The teaching staff consisted, however, not just of Shi'ites, but also of Christians, including headmaster Michael Shaban. The school soon also "became a nucleus for political activity", with Sharafeddin supporting especially the Palestinian demand for independence. Shortly after the beginning of the 1936–1939 Arab revolt in Palestine, he had received the Grand Mufti of Jerusalem Amin al-Husseini, who evaded a British arrest warrant, in Tyre against the efforts of the French regime and thanks to crowds of popular support.

The borders were open during those times, and many Palestinian Jews used to spend holidays in Tyre, while vice versa many Southern Lebanese would travel freely to Haifa and Tel Aviv.

=== World War II ===
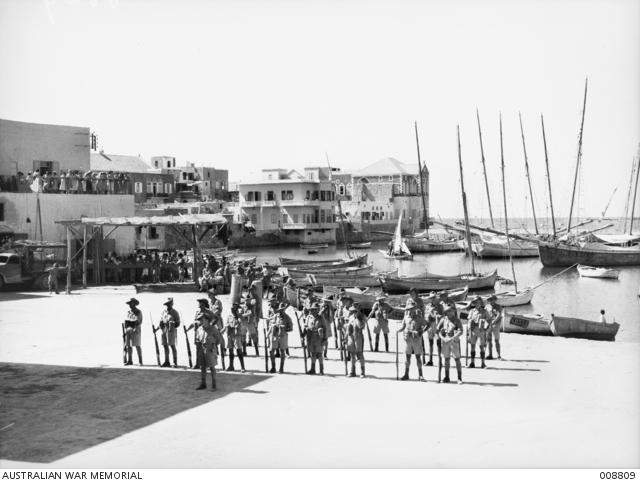
Australian troops in June 1941

After the start of the Second World War, French troops once again used the historical garrison building of Khan Sour as a base.

In 1940, French soldiers loyal to Marshal Philippe Pétain dug out an anti-tank trench at Tyre on the road leading South and discovered a marble sarcophagus from the first or second century CE, which is exhibited at the National Museum in Beirut.

In mid-1941, the joint British–Free French Syria–Lebanon campaign began to topple the Vichy regime in Syria and Lebanon. It relied heavily on Indian troops and also included the Australian 21st Brigade. These forces liberated Tyre from the Nazi-collaborators on 8 June.

It is not known how Tyre experienced the end of colonial rule and the transfer of power in the two years leading up to Lebanese independence on 22 November 1943.

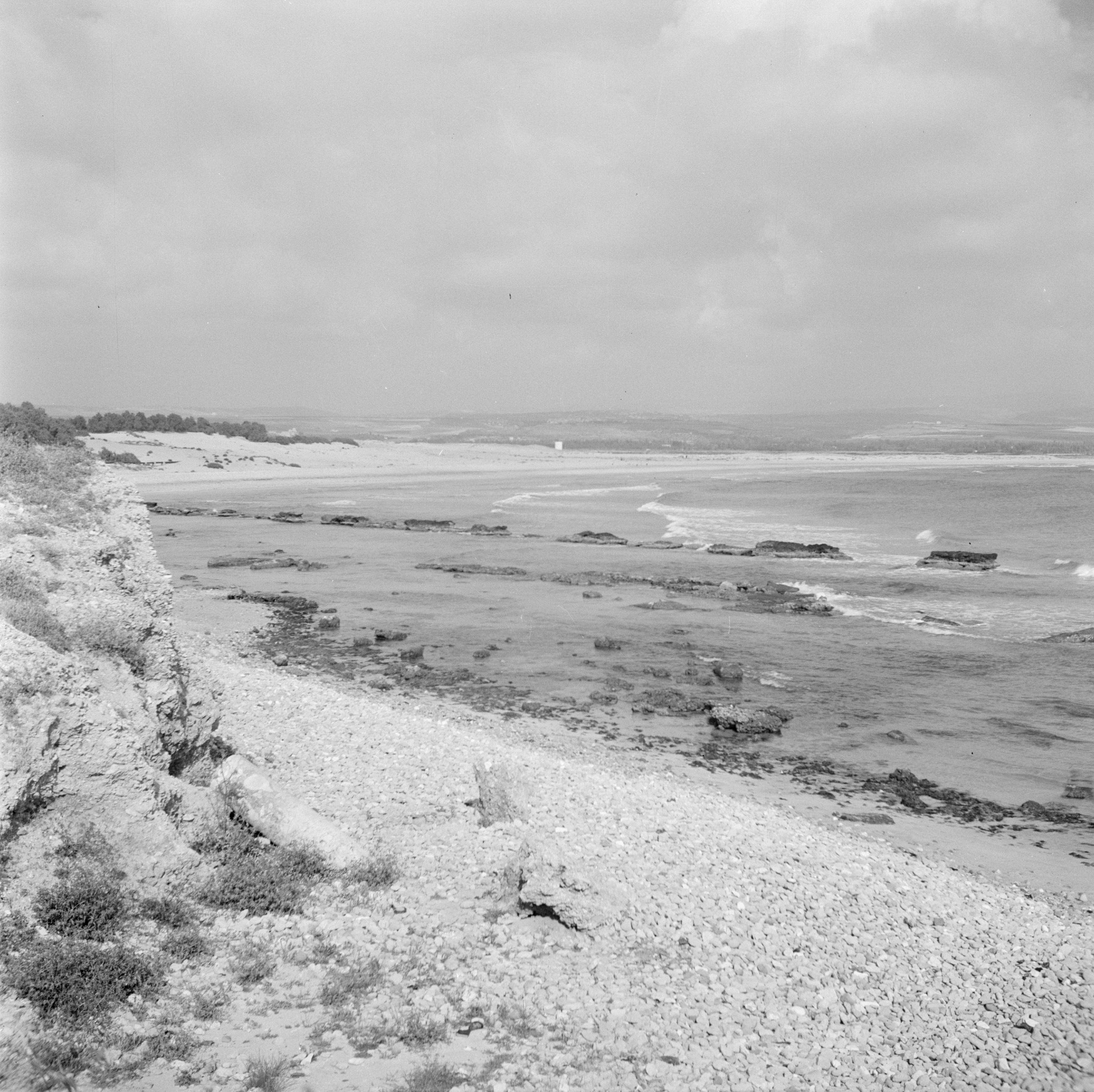
The isthmus in 1950

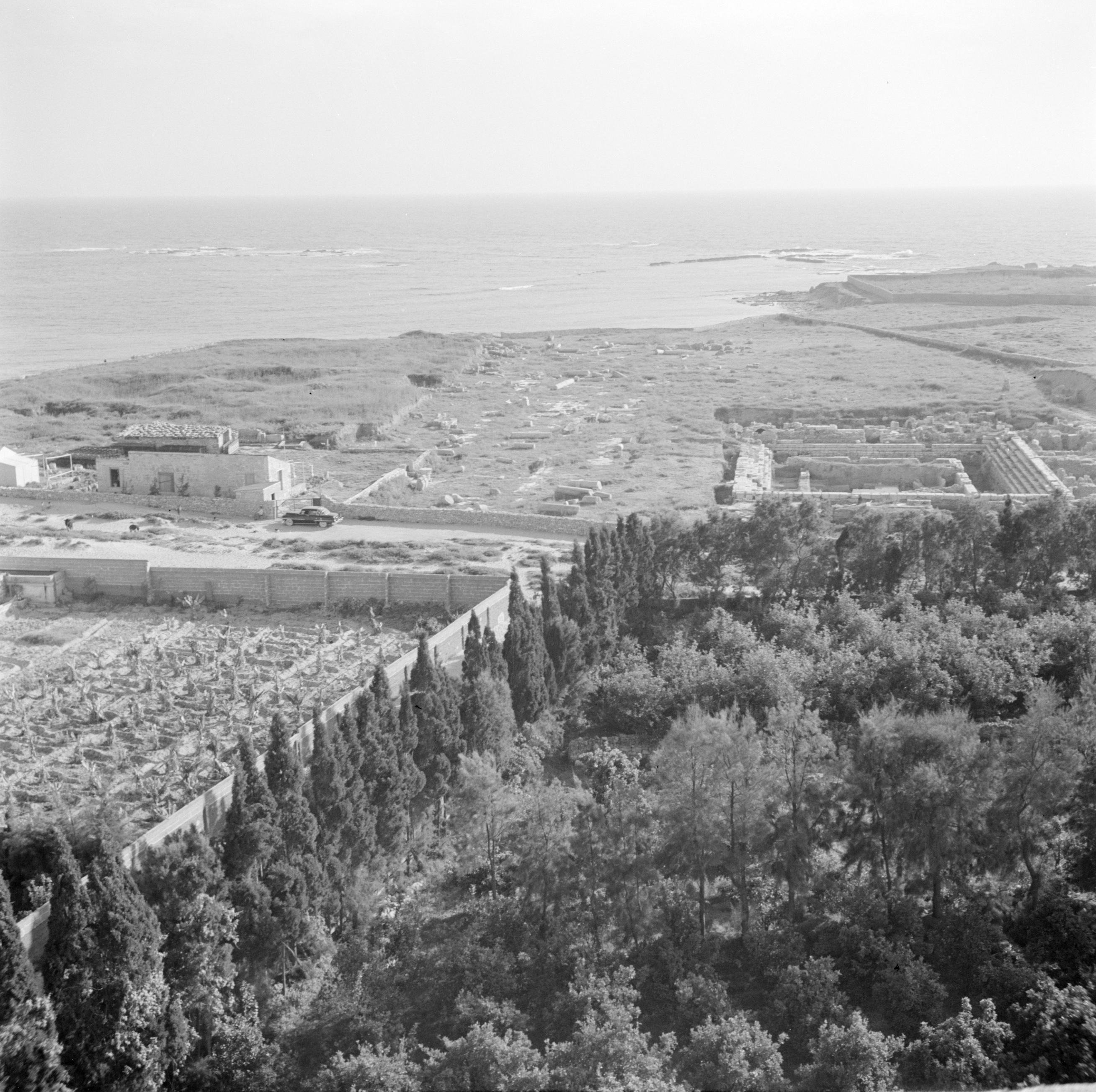
Al Mina site, partly covered

== 1943 Lebanese independence ==
When France dispatched troops to Beirut during the 1945 Levant Crisis, it was Imam Sharafeddin who sent a petition to the Legation of the United States in the capital. In 1946, Jafariya School was upgraded to be a Secondary School, the first in Southern Lebanon. Imam Sharafeddine appointed as its founding director George Kenaan, a Lebanese Christian. The expansion was possible especially thanks to funding from merchants who had emigrated from Tyre to Western Africa and made their fortunes there.

In contrast, a school project by Sharafeddin's political rival Kazem al-Khalil failed despite support from prime minister Riad al-Sulh, to whose family the al-Khalil feudal dynasty was traditionally allied.

Meanwhile, the Maronite political leader Émile Eddé – a former Prime Minister and President – reportedly suggested to the Zionist leader Chaim Weizmann that a Christian Lebanon

should relinquish some portions of the no longer wanted territory, but to the Jewish state-in-the-making. It could have Tyre and Sidon and the 100,000 Muslims living there, but when he put the matter to Weizmann, even he balked at what he called "a gift which bites".

=== 1948 Palestinian exodus ===
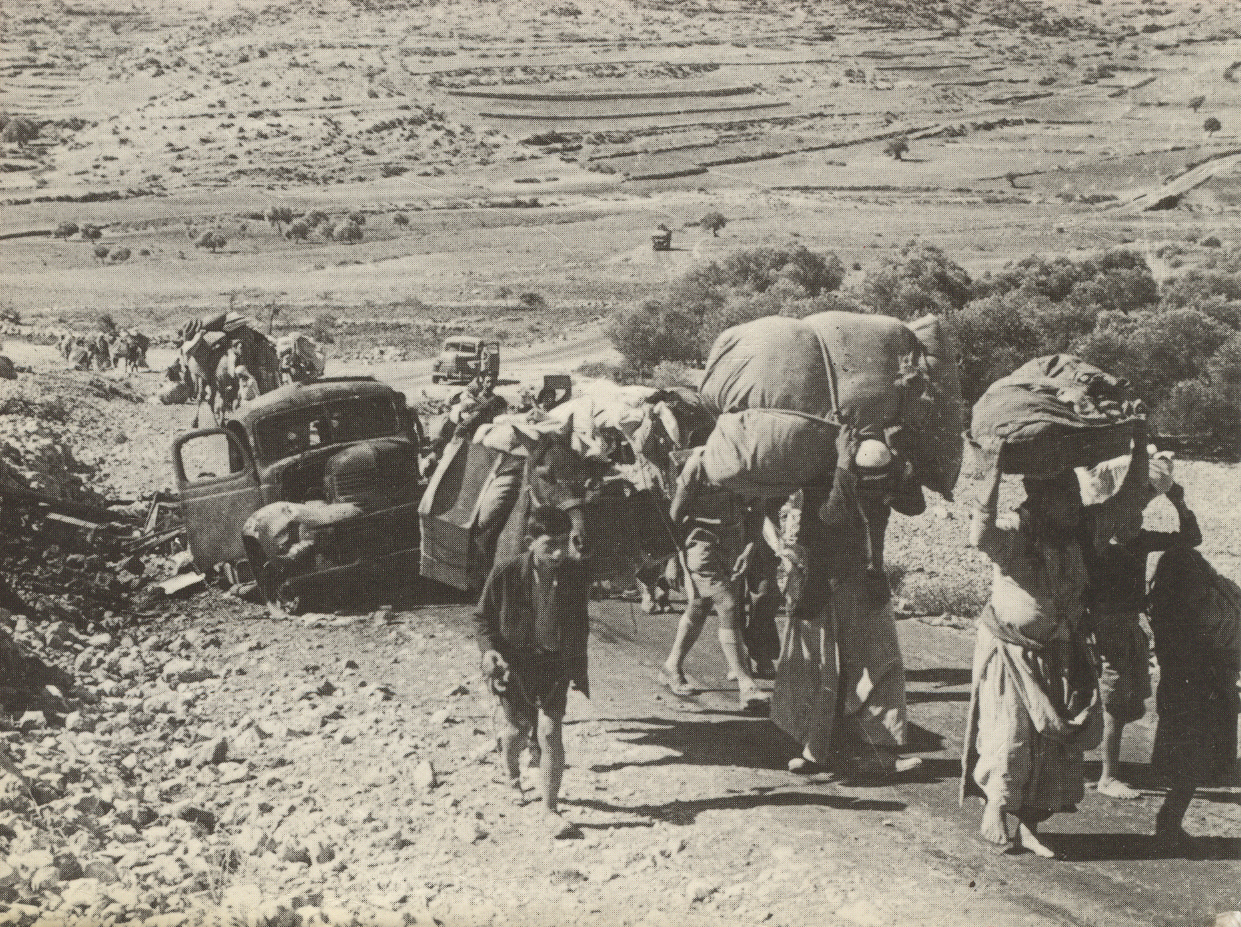
Palestinians fleeing from Galilee to Lebanon in October / November 1948

When the state of Israel was declared in May 1948, Tyre was immediately affected: with the Palestinian exodus – also known as the Nakba – thousands of Palestinian refugees fled to the city, often by boat. Many of them were given shelter by Imam Sharafeddin in the Jafariya School.

On 17 July 1948, two Israeli frigates shelled Tyre to attack a unit of Fawzi al-Qawuqji's Arab Liberation Army (ALA). When the Israel Defense Forces (IDF) conducted Operation Hiram in October 1948 to capture Upper Galilee from the ALA, thousands more Palestinians fled to Southern Lebanon. Many of them found refuge in Tyre. Subsequently, its position next to the closed border further marginalised the city, "which was already sidelined by Beirut and Sidon".

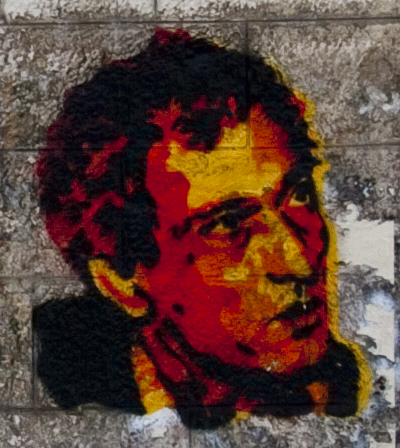
Graffito of Naji Al-Ali in Ramallah, 2012

Still in 1948, the Burj El Shimali camp was established next to the Tyre peninsula, mainly for displaced from Hawla, Lubieh, Saffuri, and Tiberias. The same year, an irregular camp was established at the Jal Al Bahar coastal strip in the Northern part of Tyre, mainly by Palestinian refugees from the village of Tarshiha. In Maachouk – 1 km to the West of Burj El Shimali – Palestinian refugees settled on agricultural lands owned by the Lebanese State, while Palestinian bedouins found refuge in Qasmieh, North of Tyre near the Litani river. In the course of the 1950s, the Armenian refugees from El Bass were resettled to the Anjar area, while Palestinians from the Acre area in Galilee moved into the camp.

Palestinian refugees played a key role in developing the citrus plantations in Tyre area, but were also competing for cheap labour opportunities in this field with the Lebanese precariat. On the other side, many of the teachers at the Jafariya Primary and Secondary school were well-educated refugees from Palestine, amongst them the famous cartoonist Naji al-Ali (1938–1987), who worked as a drawing instructor from 1961 until 1963 and went on to create Handala, the iconic symbol of Palestinian identity and defiance.

In 1950, the new building of the Jafariya School was inaugurated and named Binayat al-Muhajir – "Building of the Emigrants" – honouring the contributions from wealthy Tyrians in Africa. At the same time, the number of Lebanese from Tyre joining that diaspora increased once again, corresponding to yet another rise in poverty. The Second Arab-Israeli War (better known as the Suez Crisis), which lasted from 29 October until 7 November 1956, had an impact on Lebanon in general and Tyre in particular as well. On November 22, a cache of weapons and explosives was found in the quarters of six Egyptians, who worked as teachers at the Jafariya School. As a consequence, the Palestinian headmaster Ibrahim al-Ramlawi was arrested. According to military intelligence, he had allowed Jafariya to become the platform for a guerrilla group of 25 Lebanese and Palestinian students who were going to launch military strikes on Israel. It is unclear whether the 1956 Chim earthquake, which killed some 136 people in the Chouf District, caused any injuries or damages in Tyre as well. On 31 December 1957, Imam Sharafeddine, the founder of modern Tyre, died at the age of 85 and at a point of time when tensions escalated once again

=== 1958 Lebanese Civil War ===
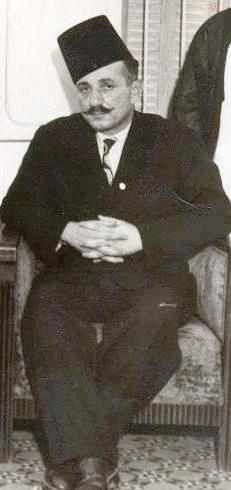
Ahmad al-Asaad

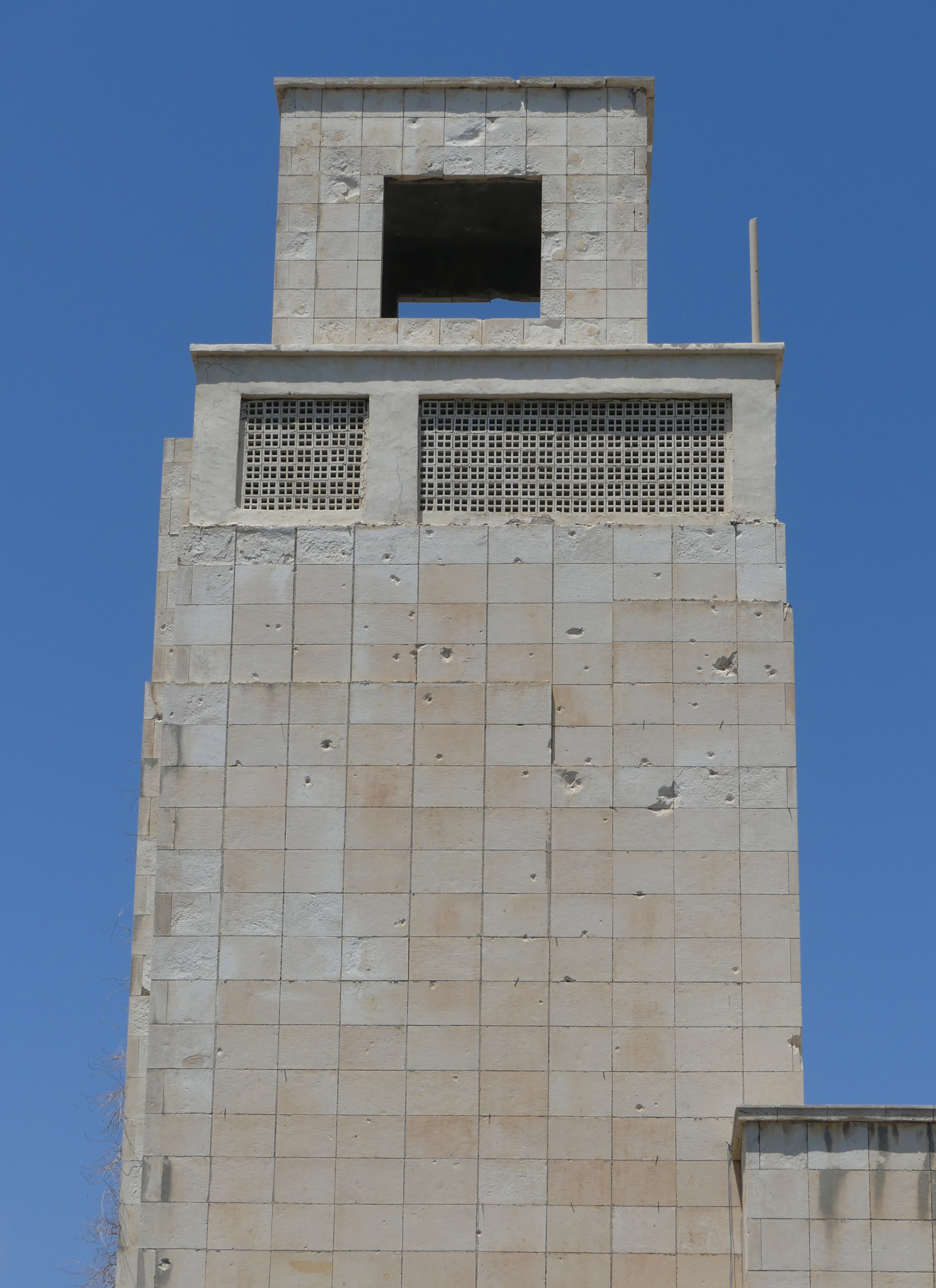
Bullet holes from 1958 at Jafariya

When President Camille Chamoun introduced a new electoral system in 1957, Ahmed al-Asaad from the feudal Ali al-Saghir dynasty, who at the beginning of the decade had even been the Speaker of the Lebanese parliament, for the first time lost the vote for deputy (MP). He had presented his candidacy in Tyre, the stronghold of his Shia rival Kazem al-Khalil, rather than in his traditional home base of Bint-Jbeil.

As a consequence, al-Asaad became a "major instigator of events against Chamoun" and his allies, primarily al-Khalil, who likewise was a long-time member of parliament and the scion of a family of large landowners ("zu'ama") ruling through patronage systems. Then, after the formation of the United Arab Republic (UAR) under Gamal Abdel Nasser in February 1958, tensions escalated in Tyre between the forces of Chamoun and supporters of Pan-Arabism. Demonstrations took place – as in Beirut and other cities – that promoted pro-union slogans and protested against US foreign policy. The Jafariya school became the base of the opposition.

Still, in February five of its students were arrested and "sent to jail for trampling on the Lebanese flag and replacing it with that of the UAR". Hussein Sharafeddin, a son of Imam Abdul Hussein Sharafeddin and as the director of Jafariya a leader in the protests, was imprisoned, too.

On 28 March, soldiers and followers of Kazem al-Khalil opened fire on demonstrators and – according to some reports – killed three. On the second of April, four or five protestors were killed and about a dozen injured. Al-Khalil alleged "that some of the demonstrators had thrown sticks of dynamite before the gendarmes fired", but this was not corroborated. Subsequently, opposition leaders like Rashid Karami expressed support for the people of Tyre, and the neighbouring city of Sidon/Saida joined the strike. A US-Diplomat, who travelled the region shortly afterwards, reported though that the clashes were more related to the personal feud between al-Asaad and al-Khalil than to national politics.

In May, the insurgents in Tyre gained the upper hand. Ahmad al-As'ad and his son Kamil al-Asaad supported them, also with weapons. According to David de Traz, the Swiss general delegate of the International Committee of the Red Cross (ICRC) who visited in late July, "heavy fighting went on for 16 days". Kazem al-Khalil was expelled from the city and the Sharafeddin family "took over control". While the rebels held the old town, the government forces controlled all access to the peninsula. The ICRC got permission from them for regular relief distributions.

The crisis dissolved in September when Chamoun stepped down. Al-Khalil returned still in 1958 but was attacked several times by gunmen. Despite the victory of the al-As'ad dynasty who had played a dominant role in Tyre and Jabal Amel for almost three centuries, its power began to crumble at the same time with the arrival of a newcomer:

=== Musa Sadr era (1959–1978) ===
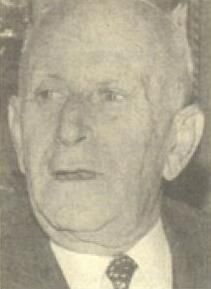
Kazem al-Khalil

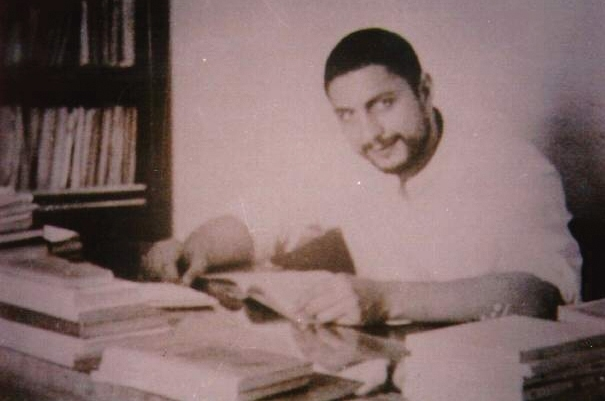
Sadr in his house in Tyre

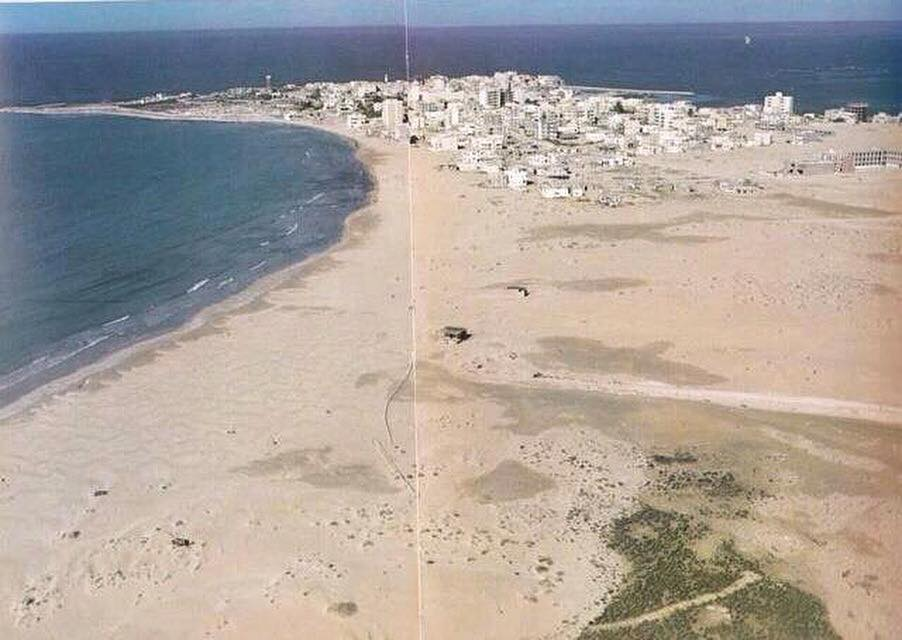
Photo dated 1950, but probably rather 1960s as the construction of buildings on the isthmus started

After Imam Sharafeddin's death in 1957, his sons and other representatives of the Shia community of Southern Lebanon asked his relative Sayyid Musa Sadr to be his successor as Imam. Sharafeddine had invited the Iran-born Sadr for his first visits to Tyre in previous years

In 1959, Sadr moved to Tyre and at first encountered not only suspicion, but also opposition. Yet, within just a few years he managed to create a broad following. As "one of his first significant acts" he established a vocational training center in neighbouring Burj El Shimali that became an important symbol of his leadership as well as other charity organisations. His base became the Abdel Hussein Mosque at the entry of the old town. On the national level, Sadr closely cooperated with the regime of General Fuad Chehab, who succeeded Chamoun in late 1958 as President of the Republic.

In 1960, the feudal lord Kazem al-Khalil lost his seat as deputy in parliament in the national election despite his alliance with wealthy expatriates in West Africa, allegedly also due to intrigues of the Lebanese Deuxième Bureau intelligence agency. In contrast, one of Sharafeddin's sons – Jafar Sharafeddin – was elected in 1960 as a Ba'athist. In parliament, to which he was re-elected in 1964, he made the following plea, which arguably summarises the precarious socio-economic situation in the mid-20th century most precisely.

By the 1960s, Tyre had a population of some 15,000 inhabitants. In the course of the decade it increasingly became subject to a rural-to-urban movement that has been ongoing ever since. In addition, the arrival of Palestinian refugees continued: In 1963, the United Nations Relief and Works Agency for Palestine Refugees (UNRWA) set up a "new camp" in Rashidieh to accommodate refugees from Deir al-Qassi, Alma, Suhmata, Nahaf, Fara and other villages in Palestine.

Towards the end of the decade, public discontent in Tyre grew as it did in other parts of the country. A protest movement started in March 1967 with a long strike by secondary students who amongst other things demanded lower fees: "In Tyre, the gendarmes fired on a demonstration, killing a student, Edward Ghanima."

In May 1967, Sadr established the Supreme Islamic Shia Council (SISC) – a strategic move that would go on to change the political landscape not only of Jabal Amel but also of the whole of Lebanon.

==== 1967 Six-Day War ====
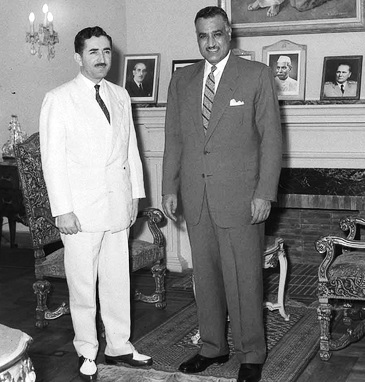
Karami (left) and Nasser in 1959

After the Six-Day War of June 1967 another wave of displaced Palestinians sought refuge in South Lebanon. In the following year, there were almost 25,000 registered Palestinian refugees in the camps of Tyre: 3,911 in Al Bass, 7,159 in Burj El Shimali, and 13,165 in Rashidieh. More found shelter in the neighbourhood of Maachouk and the gathering of Jal Al Bahar.

In the 1968 elections for the national parliament, about 40,000 Tyrians were entitled to elect three Shiite representatives as deputies: the greatest number of votes went to the two candidates allied to veteran prime minister Rachid Karami: both lawyer Muhammad Safi Al-Din and businessman Ali Arab, who had made his fortune in South America, were former ministers and long-time deputies. The third seat went to Baathist Jafar Sharafeddin, who was supported by Karami in the 1958 Civil War.

Kazem al-Khalil, Tyre's main feudal lord and long-time MP, who already lost the elections in 1960 and 1964, came in at a close fourth place. Hence, the former minister complained about "armed demonstrations, bribery, and arrests". While the extent of apparent irregularities could not be determined, there is evidence that Khalil himself had sought financial assistance from the US Embassy in Beirut.

The solidarity of the Lebanese Tyrians with the Palestinians was especially demonstrated in January 1969 through a general strike to demand the repulsion of Israeli attacks on Palestinian targets in Beirut. At the same time though, the arrival of civilian refugees went along with an increasingly strong presence of Palestinian Militants. Thus, clashes between Palestinians and Israel increased dramatically:

On 12 May 1970, the IDF launched a number of attacks in South Lebanon, including Tyre. The Palestinian insurgency in South Lebanon escalated further after the conflict of Black September 1970 between the Jordanian Armed Forces (JAF) and the Palestine Liberation Organization (PLO). The PLO allegedly also trained Nicaraguan Sandinista rebels in Tyre.

In the 1972 national elections, former Baathist Ali al-Khalil won one of the deputy seats for Tyre District. His namesake Kazem al-Khalil regained his seat with support from a rich expatriate in Nigeria and became one of the fiercest opponents of the Palestinian fighters in parliament. Meanwhile, al-Khalil's rival Jafar Sharafeddin became more alienated from Sadr because of the Sharafeddin alliance with Kamil al-As'ad from the Ali al-Saghir dynasty, whereas Sadr opposed the zu'ama feudal landlords altogether. In early 1973, growing public discontent manifested itself again in "wildcat strikes and violent demonstrations" in Tyre as in other cities.

==== 1973 Yom Kippur War ====
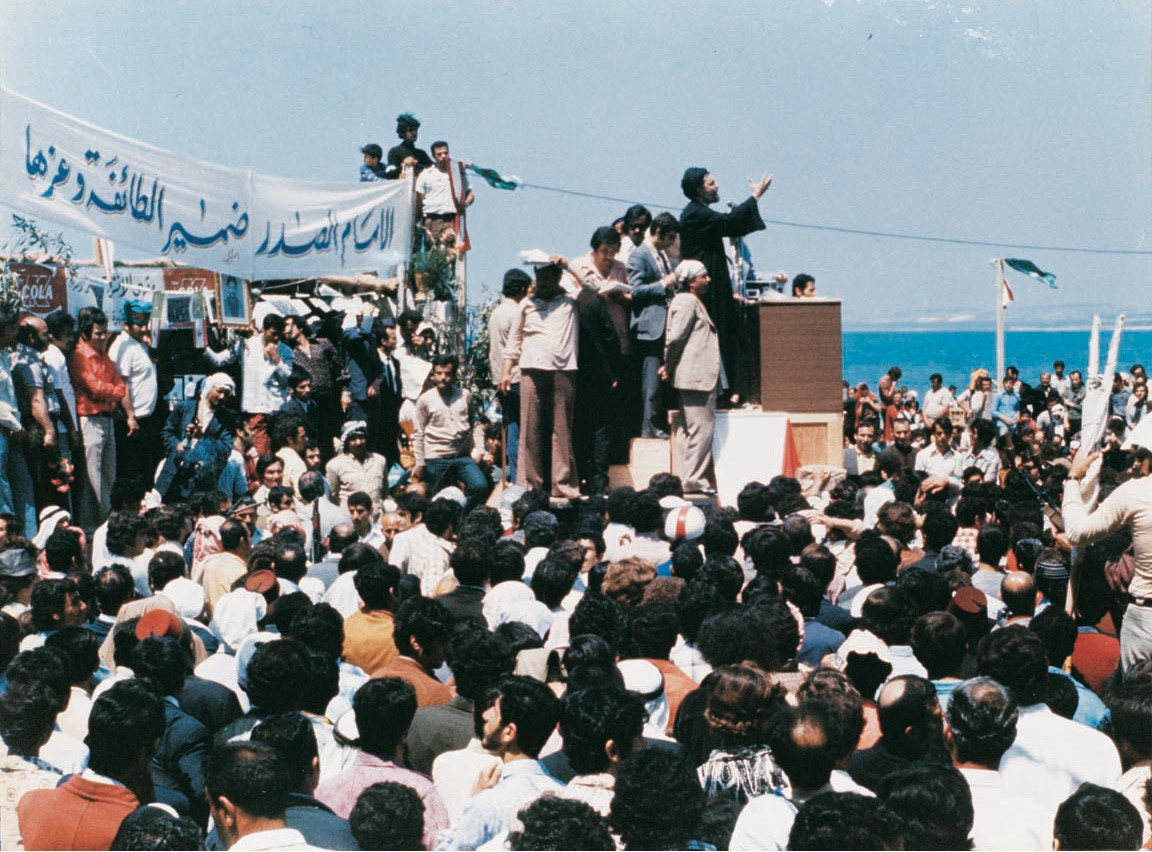
Sadr speaking in Tyre, 1974

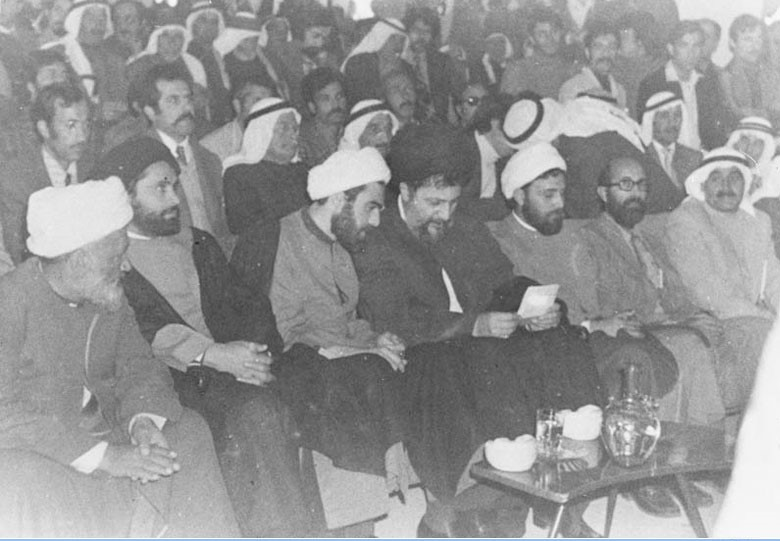
Al-Sadr with Mostafa Chamran

The 1973 October Yom Kippur War signalled even more Palestinian military operations from Southern Lebanese territory, including Tyre, which in turn increasingly sparked Israeli retaliation. In this environment, Imam Sadr was balancing the relations between the Maronite-dominated state, the Palestinian resistance with its leftist Lebanese supporters, and his own Shia community, which increasingly harboured popular discontent with the PLO domination in Southern Lebanon and being caught in the crossfire with Israel. There, Sadr's power struggle with the traditional feudal rulers escalated: thanks to the backing of the SISC Sadr managed to gradually break up the inherited power of Kamil al-As'ad – a close ally of President Suleiman Frangieh – from the Ali al-Saghir dynasty after almost three centuries, although al-As'ad's list still dominated the South in the parliamentary elections of 1972 and the by-elections of 1974.

Likewise, the large landlord Kazem al-Khalil in Tyre, who had been a fierce opponent of both As'ad and Sadr, re-gained his parliamentary seat in 1972, but was soon marginalised by two other organisations that Sadr set up. In 1974, Sadr founded Harakat al-Mahroumin ("Movement of the Deprived"). While it reached out beyond the Shia communities of Southern Lebanon to those fragmented ones in the Bekaa Valley and Beirut for creating a united Shia identity in the Lebanese context, Sadr also sought close cooperation with the Christian minorities, especially the Greek-Catholic Melkites under the leadership of Tyre's archbishop Georges Haddad. It is estimated that some eighty thousand of Sadr's followers rallied in Tyre on 5 May 1974, with weapons on open display. Shortly afterwards, the Israeli military attacked: on May 19, the Israeli Navy reportedly shelled Rashidieh, killing 5 people and injuring 11. On 20 June, the Israeli Air Force (IAF) bombed the two main refugee camps in Tyre. According to the Lebanese army, 5 people were killed and 21 injured in Rashidieh, while 8 were killed and 30 injured in Burj El Shemali.

In this context, despite his pledges to nonviolent means, Sadr also founded the de facto military wing of his movement in 1975, just before the outbreak of the civil war: the Afwaj al-Muqawama al-Lubnaniyya (Amal).

The Iranian director of Sadr's technical school in Tyre, Mostafa Chamran, became a major instructor of guerilla warfare. The US-trained physicist went on to become the first defense minister of post-revolutionary Iran. Other key figures of the Iranian opposition, like Sayed Ruhollah Khomeini's close aide Sadeq Tabatabaei, were frequent visitors of Tyre. In contrast, Khalil al-Khalil – one of the sons of Kazem al-Khalil – served as Lebanon's Ambassador to the Imperial State of Iran from 1971 to 1978.

On the national stage of politics, one of Sadr's main allies was the Lebanese Druze leader Kamal Jumblatt. However, frictions between them led to a break-up of their coalition soon after the beginning of the civil war in 1975 under Jumblatt's leadership the National Lebanese Movement (NLM) allied itself to the PLO.

==== Lebanese Civil War (1975–1990) ====
===== PLO and LAA take-over: "People's Republic of Tyre" =====
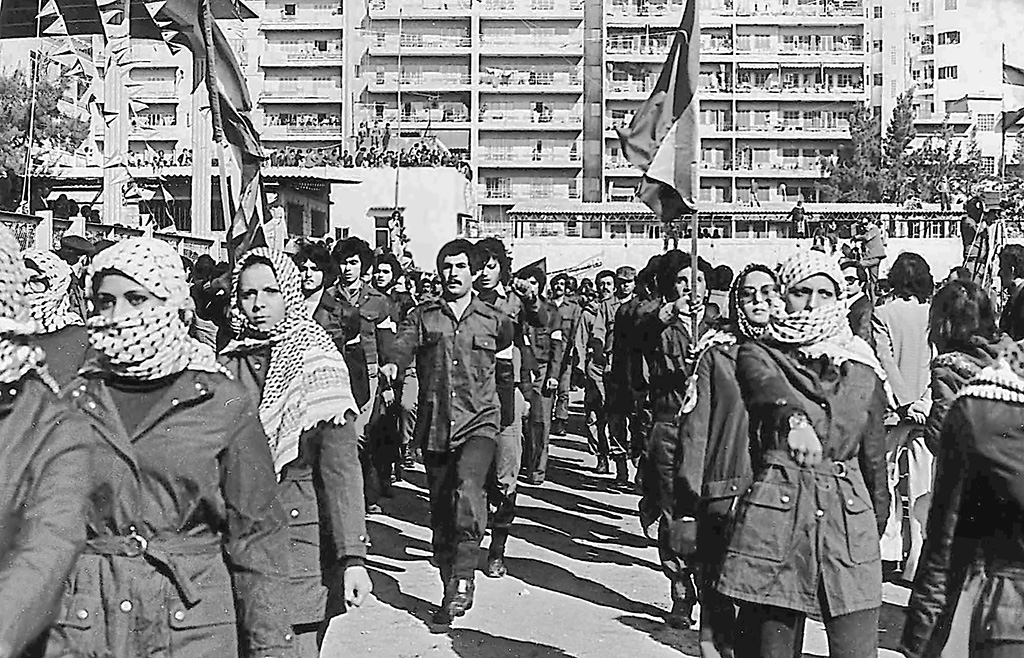
Fedayeen at a rally in Beirut, 1979

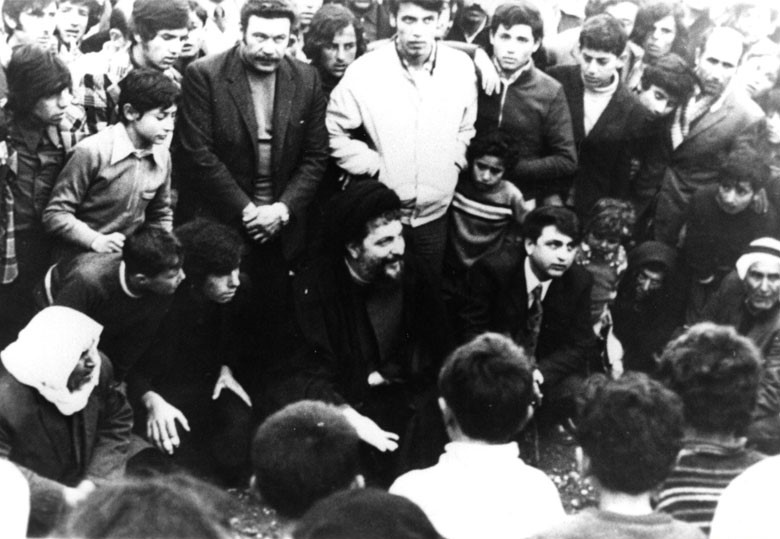
Musa Sadr visiting bombarded areas in Southern Lebanon

In January 1975, a unit of the Popular Front for the Liberation of Palestine (PFLP) attacked the Tyre barracks of the Lebanese Army. The assault was denounced though by the PLO as "a premeditated and reckless act". Also, one of the residences of feudal lord Kazem al-Khalil "was dynamited" and another one of his homes "was seized by Palestinian guerrillas".

In February 1975, Tyre saw pro-PLO and anti-government demonstrations after Arab Nationalist MP Maarouf Saad had been killed in Sidon, allegedly by the army. Then, in early March 1975, a PLO commando of eight militants sailed from the coast of Tyre to Tel Aviv to mount the Savoy Hotel attack, during which eight civilian Hostages and three Israeli soldiers were killed as well as seven of the attackers. Five months later – on 5 August 1975 – Israel attacked Tyre "from land, sea and air". More assaults followed on 16 and 29 August, as well as on 3 September.

In 1976, local commanders of the PLO took over the municipal government of Tyre with support from their allies of the Lebanese Arab Army (LAA). They occupied the army barracks, set up roadblocks and started collecting customs at the port. Parts of Kazem al-Khalil's estate were confiscated as well. Most of the funding, according to Robert Fisk, came from Iraq though, while arms and ammunition were provided by Libya.

The new rulers thus declared the founding of the "People's Republic of Tyre". However, they quickly lost support from the Lebanese-Tyrian population because of their "arbitrary and often brutal behavior". Even Tyre's veteran politician Jafar Sharafeddin, whose family has promoted freedom for the Palestinians over generations, was quoted as criticising the PLO for "its violations and sabotage of the Palestinian cause".

When Syria invaded Lebanon in mid-1976, it committed to a proposal by the Arab League not to cross the Litani River southwards. So while the Lebanese Civil War had started in South Lebanon, it was spared from much of the internal fighting. However, many young men from the area moved northwards to take part in combat. At the same time, Israel started engaging in a naval blockade of Tyre harbour and other Southern Lebanese ports to cut off supplies to the PLO, choking off most other maritime trade there as well.

In 1977, three Lebanese fishermen in Tyre lost their lives by an Israeli attack. Palestinian militants retaliated with rocket fire on the Israeli town of Nahariya, leaving three civilians dead. Israel in turn retaliated by killing "over a hundred" mainly Lebanese Shiite civilians in the Southern Lebanese countryside. Some sources reported that these lethal events took place in July, whereas others dated them to November. According to the latter, the IDF also conducted heavy airstrikes as well as artillery and gunboat shelling on Tyre and surrounding villages, especially on the Palestinian refugee camps in Rashidieh, Burj El Shimali and El Bass.

Thus, it was again especially the common people of Tyre and its hinterlands, who greatly suffered from the political conflicts. Due to growing mass-poverty a new wave of emigration from Tyre area to West Africa, especially to Ivory Coast, though not so much to Senegal as before.

===== 1978 South Lebanon conflict with Israel =====
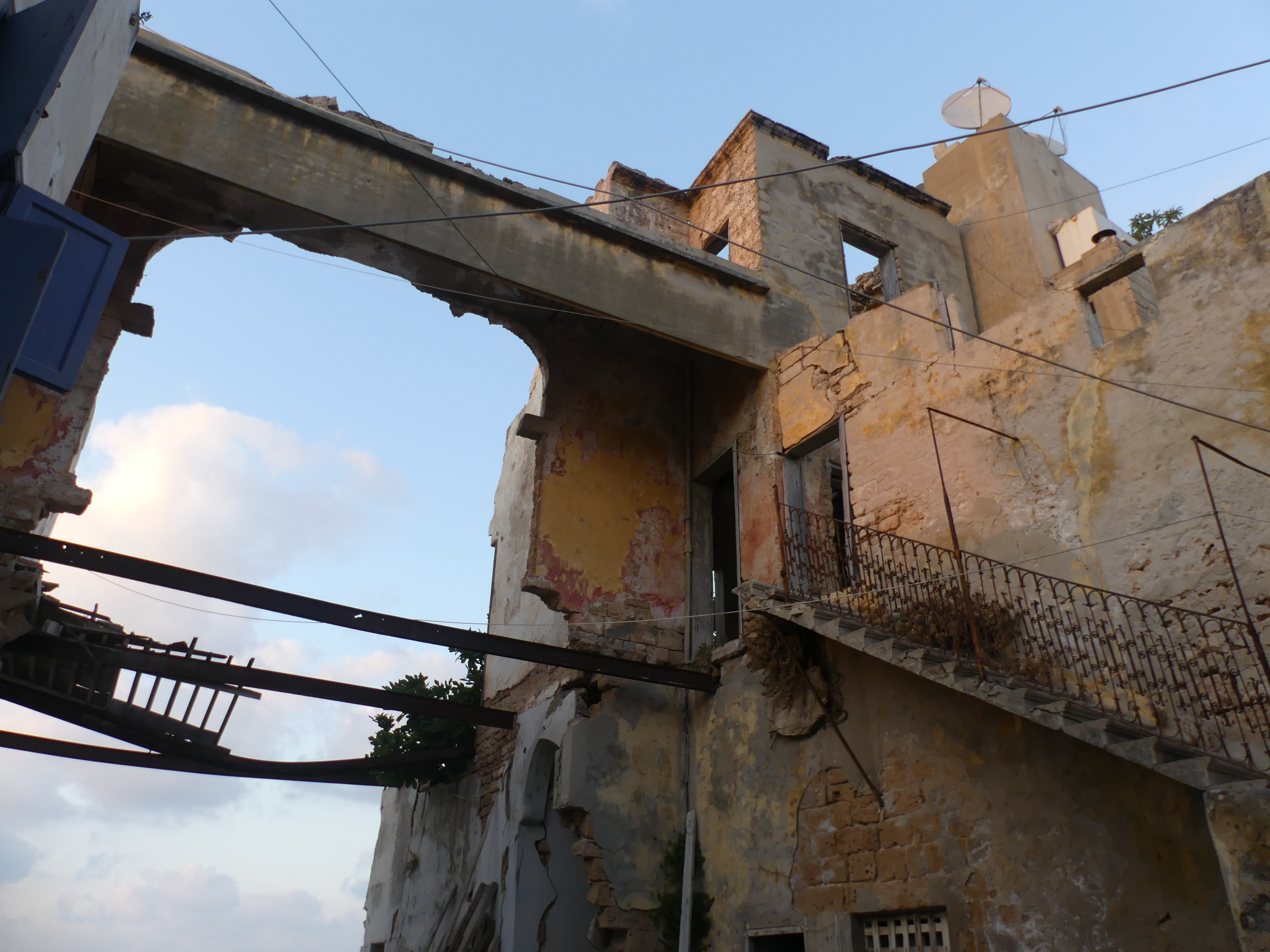
The ruins of Beit Shaddad in the Christian quarter on the northwestern tip of the peninsula (2019)

On 11 March 1978, Dalal Mughrabi – a young woman from the Palestinian refugee camp of Sabra in Beirut – and a dozen fedayeen fighters sailed from Tyre to a beach north of Tel Aviv. They then committed the Coastal Road massacre that killed 38 Israeli civilians, including 13 children, and wounded 71. Of the 11 perpetrators, 9 were killed. According to the United Nations, the PLO "claimed responsibility". Three days later the IDF invaded Lebanon "and in a few days occupied the entire southern part of the country except for the city of Tyre and its surrounding area."

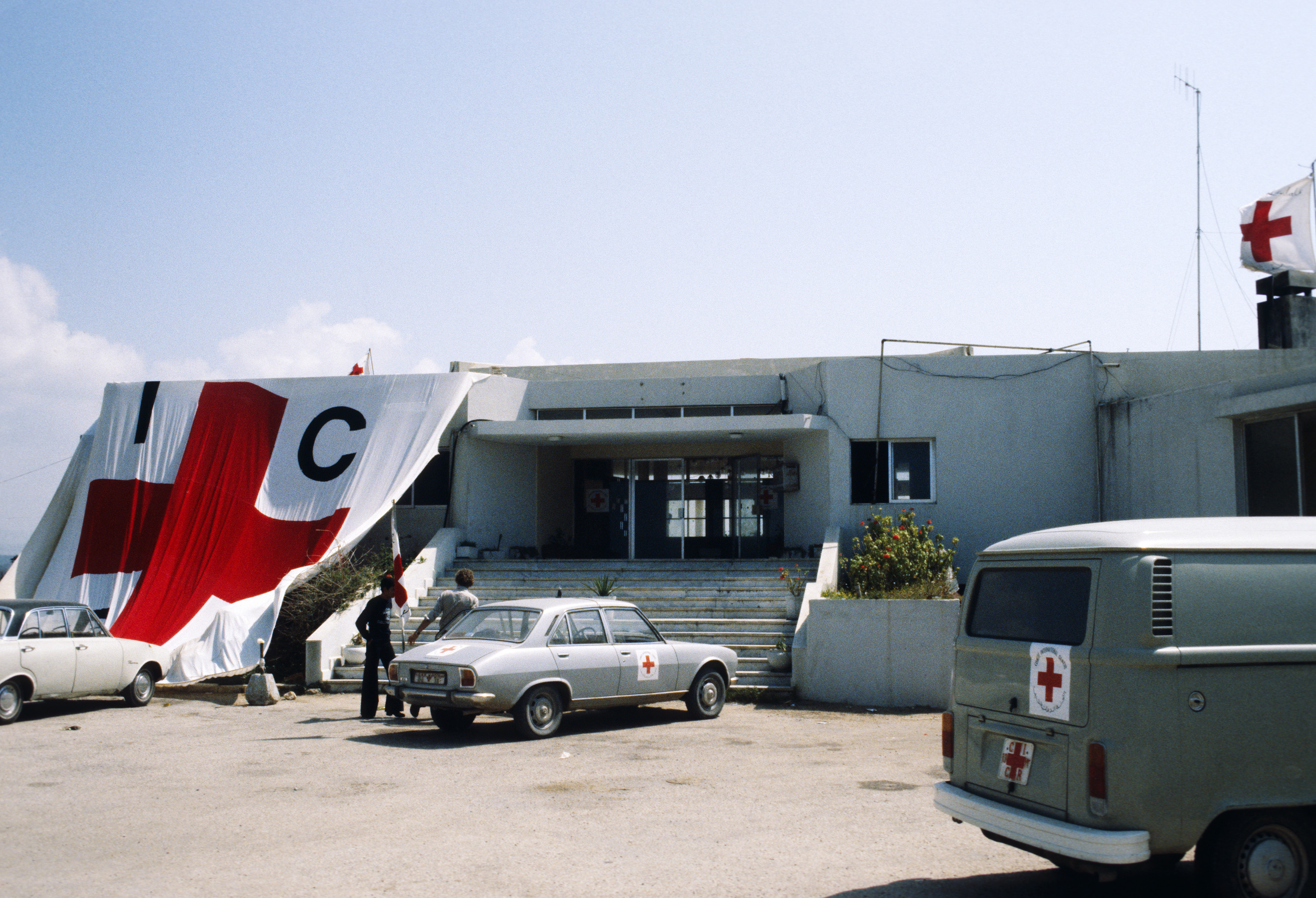
The sub-delegation of the ICRC at the Tyre Rest House, from where civilians were evacuated to security zones.

Nevertheless, Tyre was badly affected in the week-long Operation that was code-named "Stone of Wisdom" but became better known as Operation Litani. Civilians once more bore the brunt of the war, both in human lives and economically. The IAF targeted especially the three Palestinian refugee camps as well as the harbour on claims that the PLO received arms from there. It destroyed a number of historical buildings like Beit Shaddad in the Christian quarter and heavily damaged many others. Shells also exploded in the Roman Hippodrome. Moreover, the old Hassan Borro Army barracks of Tyre came under fire and were reportedly abandoned by the dissident Lebanese Arab Army, but held by its Palestinian allies.

The late West Point professor Augustus Richard Norton, who shortly after the conflict served as an observer in the United Nations Truce Supervision Organization (UNTSO) in Southern Lebanon, estimated that the IDF military operation killed altogether about 1,100 people, most of them Palestinian and Lebanese civilians. According to Noam Chomsky, some 2,000 Lebanese and Palestinian lost their lives and up to 250,000 people were displaced. In Tyre, Robert Fisk estimated that only some 300 Lebanese civilians out of a population of 60,000 stayed. On 19 March, the United Nations Security Council adopted resolutions 425 and 426,

in which it called upon Israel immediately to cease its military action and withdraw its forces from all Lebanese territory. It also decided on the immediate establishment of the United Nations Interim Force in Lebanon (UNIFIL)."

Four days later the UNIFIL advance guard arrived: a battalion of French paratroopers led by Colonel Jean Germain Salvan. Its convoy of 14 trucks crossed the Litani and drove into Tyre on 23 March 1978. According to Fisk, the Palestinian commander of the Hassan Borro barracks offered to hand the base over to the French, but Arafat's opponents within the PLO – PFLP; DFLP and Arab Liberation Front – defied his orders to cooperate. A month later things escalated:

On April 30, French soldiers killed at least one Palestinian gunman and wounded two others. On the following day, three Senegalese UNIFIL soldiers died when their jeep ran over a land mine near Tyre. Again one day later, a hitherto unknown group called the Popular Front for the Liberation of South Lebanon, which was allegedly tied to the rejectionist PLO wing, opened fire on the French base and ambushed a convoy nearby. One Senegalese and two French soldiers were killed as well as one Palestinian liaison officer, while nine UNIFIL soldiers were badly injured, amongst them commander Salvan, who was severely wounded in both legs.

As those Palestinian forces were unwilling to give up their positions in and around Tyre, UNIFIL suffered more casualties and was effectively forced to abandon its base in the Tyre barracks. Its leadership moved the headquarters instead southwards into the strip of Lebanon held by Israel. UNIFIL thus accepted in its area of operation an enclave of Palestinian fighters which was dubbed the "Tyre Pocket". Hence, the PLO kept ruling Tyre with its Lebanese allies of the NLM, which was in disarray though after the 1977 assassination of its leader Kamal Jumblatt.

=== Post–Sadr Era (since 1978) ===
==== Amal-PLO-Israel conflicts ====
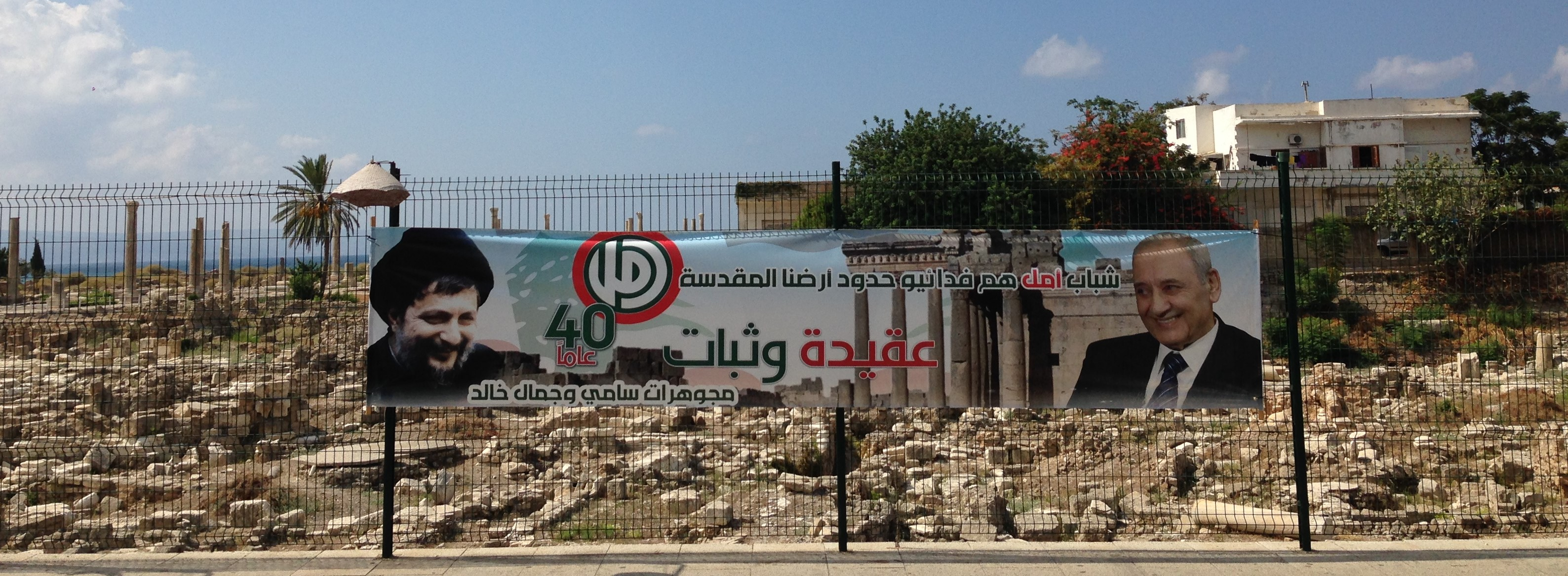
A banner commemorating the 40th anniversary of Sadr's disappearance

Only a few months after the conflict, on 31 August 1978, Amal-Leader Musa Sadr mysteriously disappeared following a visit to Libyan leader Muammar Gaddafi. His legacy has continued into the present: he has been widely credited with "bringing the Shi'ite community onto an equal footing with the other major Lebanese communities. And while the loss of Sadr was great, it also became and has remained a major rallying point for the Shia community across Lebanon, particularly in Southern Lebanon.

Frequent IDF bombardments of Tyre from ground, sea and air raids continued after 1978. In January 1979, Israel started naval attacks on the city According to Palestinian witnesses, two women were killed in the Burj El Shemali camp, 15 houses totally destroyed and 70 damaged.

Meanwhile, the PLO reportedly converted itself into a regular army by purchasing large weapon systems, including Soviet WWII-era T-34 tanks, which it deployed in the "Tyre Pocket" with an estimated 1,500 fighters. From there it kept firing Katyusha rockets across the Southern border.

On 27 April 1981, the Irish UNIFIL-soldier Kevin Joyce was kidnapped by a Palestinian faction from his observation post near the village of Dyar Ntar and, "according to UN intelligence reports, was taken to a Palestinian refugee camp in Tyre. He was shot dead a few weeks later following a gun battle between Palestinians and UN soldiers in south Lebanon."

The PLO kept shelling into Galilee until a cease-fire in July 1981. On the 23rd of that month, the IDF had bombed Tyre.

As discontent within the Shiite population about the suffering from the conflict between Israel and the Palestinian factions grew, so did tensions between Amal and the Palestinian militants. The power struggle was exacerbated by the fact that the PLO supported Saddam Hussein's camp during the Iraq-Iran-War, whereas Amal sided with Teheran. Eventually, tensions escalated into violent clashes in many villages of Southern Lebanon, including the Tyre area. In the city itself, the heaviest such incident took place in April 1982, when the PLO (Fateh) bombarded Amal's Technical Institute in Burj El Shimali for ten hours.

==== 1982 Lebanon War with Israel and Occupation ====
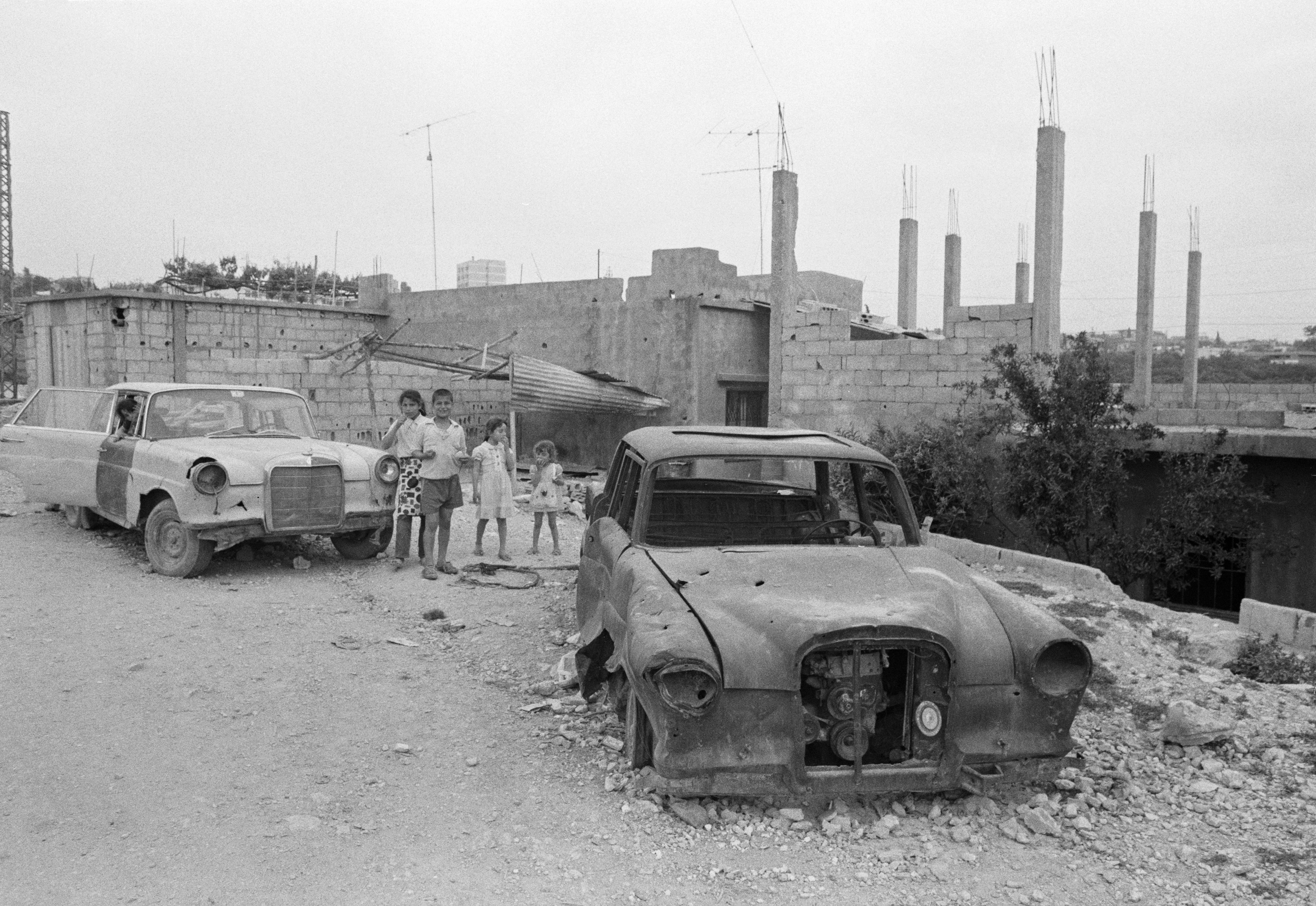
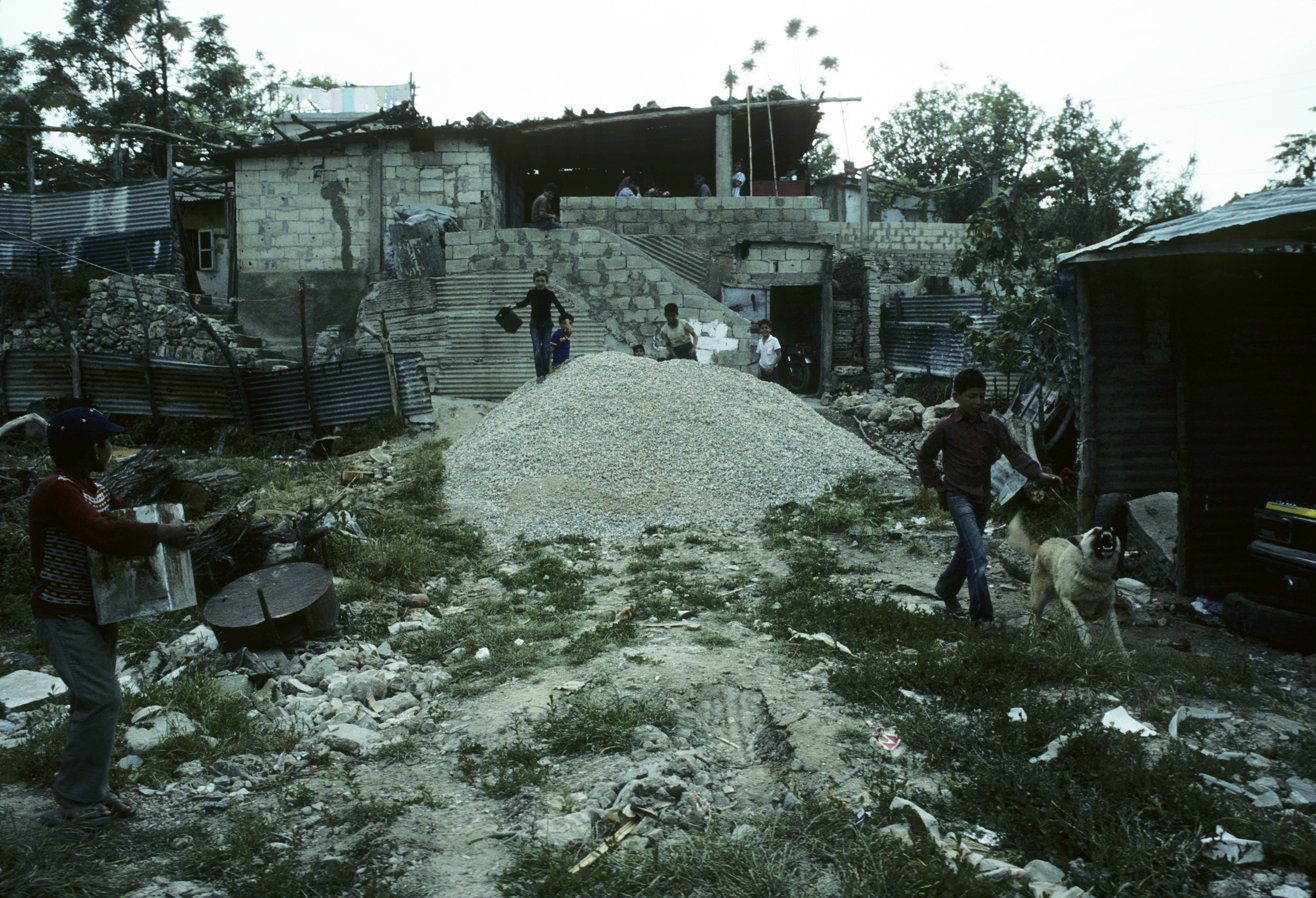
Destruction in the Rashidieh camp, photographed in 1983 by Jean Mohr (1925–2018) for the ICRC

Following an assassination attempt on Israeli ambassador Shlomo Argov in London, the IDF began an invasion of Lebanon on 6 June 1982. It heavily afflicted Tyre once again, as the invaders attacked from all sides.

While helicopters and boats landed advance troops on the coast to the North of the city, naval vessels shelled the city from the sea and warplanes bombed it from the air. The tanks advancing from the South were backed up by infantry and artillery. According to John Bulloch, the Beirut-based correspondent of The Daily Telegraph at the time, the IAF even dropped US-supplied cluster bombs on Rashidieh.

Altogether, air raids alone killed some 80 people on the first day. Though the PLO had reportedly left its positions on the peninsula, urban Tyre with the market area in particular was heavily bombarded as well. Historical buildings like the Serail and Khan Sour were partly destroyed. The latter had been taken over by the Al-Ashkar family from the Melkite Greek Catholic Archeparchy of Tyre after WWII and became known as Khan Al-Ashkar. However, the Palestinian camps were bearing the brunt of the assault, as many guerillas fought till the end. Chomsky recorded that

The first target was the Palestinian camp of Rashidiyeh south of Tyre, much of which, by the second day of the invasion, "had become a field of rubble." There was ineffectual resistance, but as an officer of the UN peace-keeping force swept aside in the Israeli invasion later remarked: "It was like shooting sparrows with cannon."

Aerial attacks on Burj El Shemali reportedly killed some 100 civilians in one shelter alone, when it was hit by phosphorus bombs. The total number of non-combatant casualties was estimated to be more than 200 just in that camp.

On 7 June, the Greek-Catholic (Melkite) archbishop Georges Haddad succeeded in temporarily halting the attack of an IDF tank column in a bold appeal to the Israeli commander, mediated by a Swiss delegate of the ICRC, to evacuate the civilian population to the beaches. More than 1,000 civilians found shelter in the improvised ICRC base at the Tyre Rest House.

The fighting stopped after two days, but the humanitarian consequences were severe, also because "the IDF had few plans for management or detention of masses of civilians, let alone for feeding." The government of Lebanon claimed that the IDF attacks killed some 1,200 civilians and injured more than 2,000 non-combatants in Tyre, whereas the IDF claimed that only 56 civilians were killed in the entire district. Estimates of IDF casualties during combat in Rashidieh and Burj El Shimali ranged between 21 and "nearly 120".

UNRWA recorded that in Rashidieh alone, more than 600 shelters were totally or partially destroyed and more than 5,000 Palestinian refugees were displaced. Those in the Burj El Shimali camp were heavily affected as well. There were 11,256 registered Palestinian refugees in Burj El Shimali at the time, and 15,356 in Rashidieh, altogether more than the entire population of urban Tyre which was estimated to be around 23,000. Much of the destruction was done "systematically" by the IDF after the fighting stopped, leaving some 13,000 Palestinians homeless in the Tyre area. Only El Bass camp with 5,415 registered Palestinians was spared much of the violence.

Still in June 1982, the Israeli forces temporarily arrested some 14,000 men in Tyre and paraded them in front of hooded collaborators who advised the occupators whom to detain. They were not considered prisoners of war, but "administrative detainees" and thus the ICRC was denied any access to check on their conditions. Women were reportedly imprisoned as well. At the same time, the IDF set up a large compound in Burj el-Shemali right next to the Amal technical training center founded by Musa Sadr:

The centre doubled as office of the Amal leader in South Lebanon, Dawud Sulayman Dawud, nicknamed "David David" because of his alleged readiness to negotiate with Israel. He was a native of Tarbikha, one of the five Shi'ite villages in northern Galilee, which were depopulated in October/November 1948, and his Lebanese opponents often called him a Palestinian. Dawud and other Amal leaders did not avoid discreet contacts with Israelis, but refused open clientship. The IDF soon lost patience and arrested thirteen Amal leaders as early as the summer of 1982.

Moreover, the IDF set up a military post in Tyre and sponsored the return of Shia feudal lord Kazem al-Khalil to the city in July 1982 after an absence of seven years. When his attempts to reconcile with Amal failed, he formed a small militia of some 40 men with Israeli support. However, al-Khalil's collaboration not only "discredited" and "delegitimised him in the eyes of the Shi'a, but also earned him the anger of the Syrians. This simple miscalculation was an act from which he was never able to fully recover politically". Amal, on the other hand, in September 1982 managed to mobilise an estimated 250,000 supporters in Tyre to commemorate the disappearance of Musa Sadr. Shortly afterwards, though, a new and hidden force became active that would go on to dominate the scene – Hezbollah.

Photos from the IDF archives

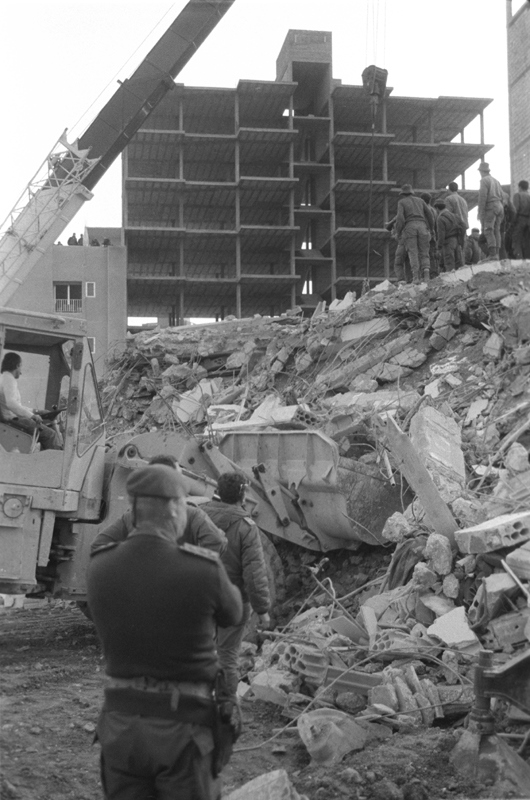
The devastation of November 1982

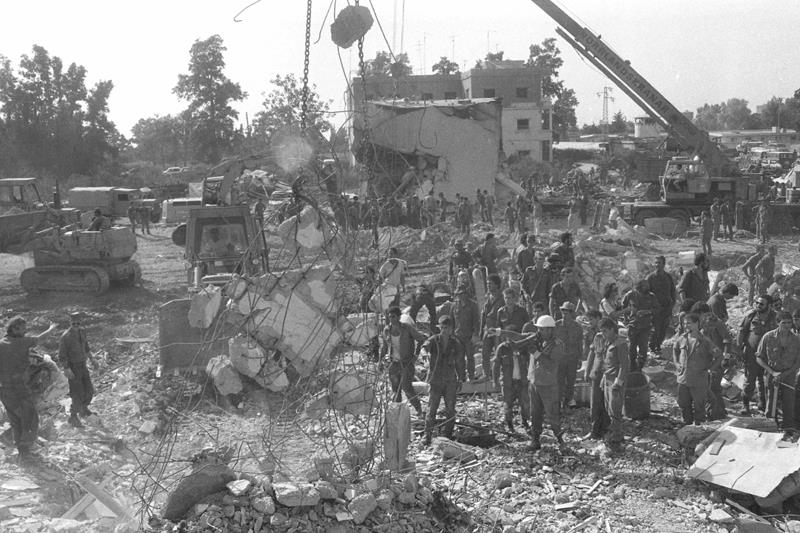
The devastation of October 1983

On 11 November 1982, nineteen-year-old Ahmed Qasir carried out a suicide-attack with an explosive-laden car. His target was the Israeli military headquarters in Tyre. Statements about casualties differ: according to some sources, ninety Israeli soldiers and officers were killed as well as an unknown number of Lebanese and Palestinians who were detainees in the complex. According to others, 67 IDF and Border Guards personnel along with nine Shin Bet agents were killed, as well as fifteen local detainees.

In June 1983, Shin Bet agents conducted a series of mass arrests in the Palestinian refugee camps of Tyre, as the suicide-attack was still not claimed by any group. On 10 June, a group of unidentified gunmen ambushed two armoured IDF vehicles and killed three soldiers. At the same time, the occupiers sponsored the founding of a new Lebanese militia in the Tyre area run by a certain Hartawi.

Regardless, almost one year after the first suicide attack, in October 1983, yet another one devastated the new Israeli headquarters in Tyre. It killed 29 Israeli soldiers and officers, wounding another thirty as confirmed by the Israeli government. 32 Lebanese and Palestinians lost their lives as well, most of them detainees. Only two years later did Hezbollah claim responsibility for the two operations.

In February 1985, Amal followed the example of its offshoot, when one of its members from Tyre launched a suicide attack on an IDF convoy in Burj El Shimali, injuring ten soldiers. According to the late Ferdinand Smit, who served three times as an information officer in the Dutch UNIFIL battalion, Israeli reprisals in the area east of Tyre killed fifteen and wounded dozens. Under the growing pressure the Israeli forces withdrew from Tyre by the end of April 1985 and instead established a self-declared "Security Zone" in Southern Lebanon with its collaborating militia allies of the South Lebanon Army (SLA). However, Tyre was left outside the SLA control.

==== War of the Camps (1985–1988): PLO vs. Amal vs. Hezbollah ====
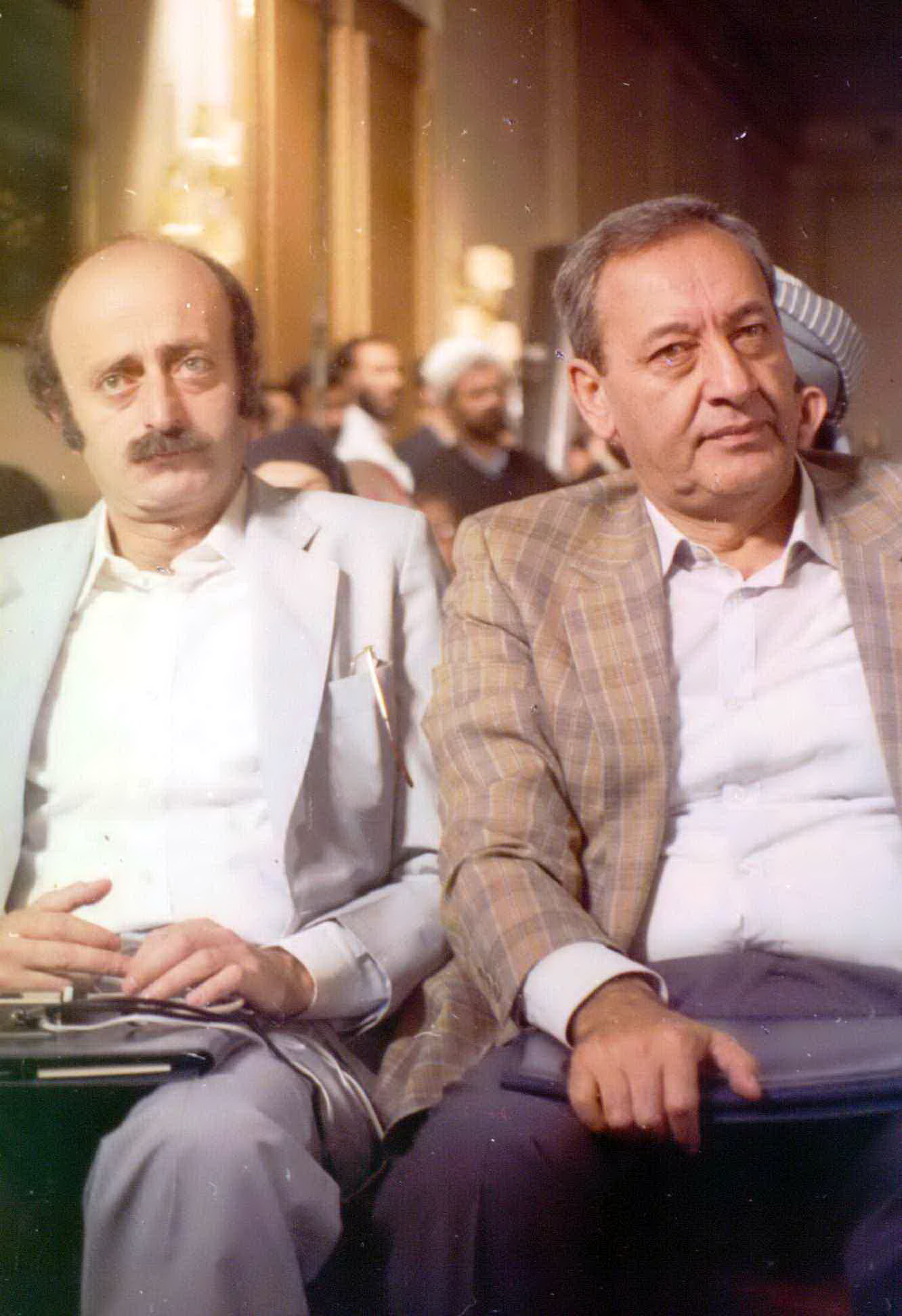
Berri (right) and Jumblatt in 1989

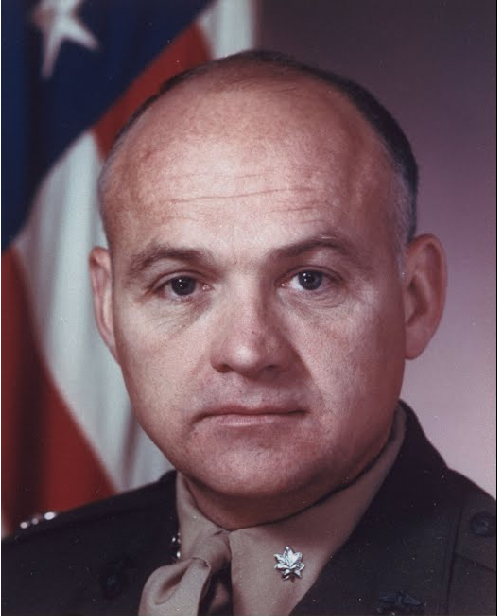
William R. Higgins (1945–1990)

Instead, Tyre was taken over by Amal under the leadership of Nabih Berri. A construction boom, especially on the isthmus, set in which was largely fuelled by remittances from Tyrian emigrants.

With regard to its political opponents, Amal arrested the pro-Israeli militia leader in Tyre, Ibrahim Farran, and another main-collaborator, Shawqi Abdallah, but unlike in other areas there were no forced displacements of Christians in Tyre and Tyre area.

On 10 September 1986, the IAF once again attacked PLO bases near Tyre. In the same month, tensions between Amal and Palestinian militants exploded into the War of the Camps, which is considered "one of the most brutal episodes in a brutal civil war": It started when a group of Palestinians fired on an Amal patrol at Rashidieh. After one month of siege, Amal attacked the refugee camp in the South of Tyre. It was reportedly assisted by the Progressive Socialist Party of Druze leader Walid Jumblatt, whose father Kamal had entered into and then broken an alliance with Amal-founder Sadr, as well as by the pro-Syrian Palestinian militia As-Saiqa and the "Popular Front for the Liberation of Palestine – General Command". Fighting spread and continued for one month. By that time some 7,000 refugees in the Tyre area were displaced once more.

In February 1988 though, "Amal seemed to lose control" when US-Colonel William R. Higgins, who served in a senior position of UNTSO, was kidnapped just South of Tyre on the coastal highway to Naqoura by armed men suspected of being affiliated with Hezbollah. The incident led to renewed clashes between Amal and Hezbollah, mainly in Beirut. Amongst the casualties was Amal's leader for South Lebanon leader, Dawood Dawood, causing "an outpour[ing] of popular grief in Tyre. Higgins was murdered by his captors after torturous captivity and declared dead in July 1990.

The final phase of the Lebanese Civil War in that year coincided with the death of feudal lord and veteran Tyre politician Kazem al-Khalil, who succumbed to a heart attack in his Paris exile.

==== Post–Civil War ====
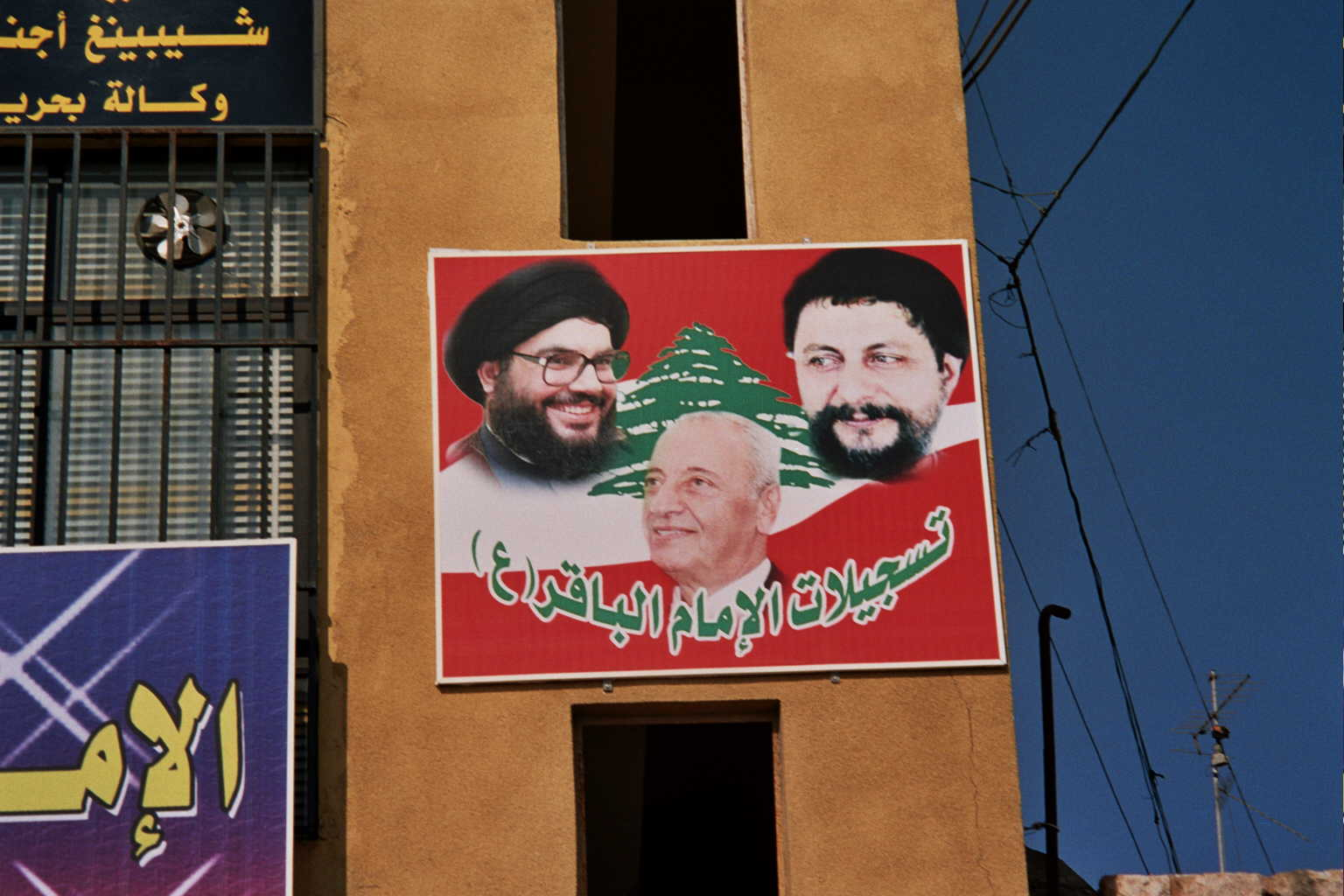
A 2005 poster in Tyre depicting the disappeared Imam Musa Sadr, Amal leader Nabih Berri, and Hezbollah leader Hassan Nasrallah (clockwise)

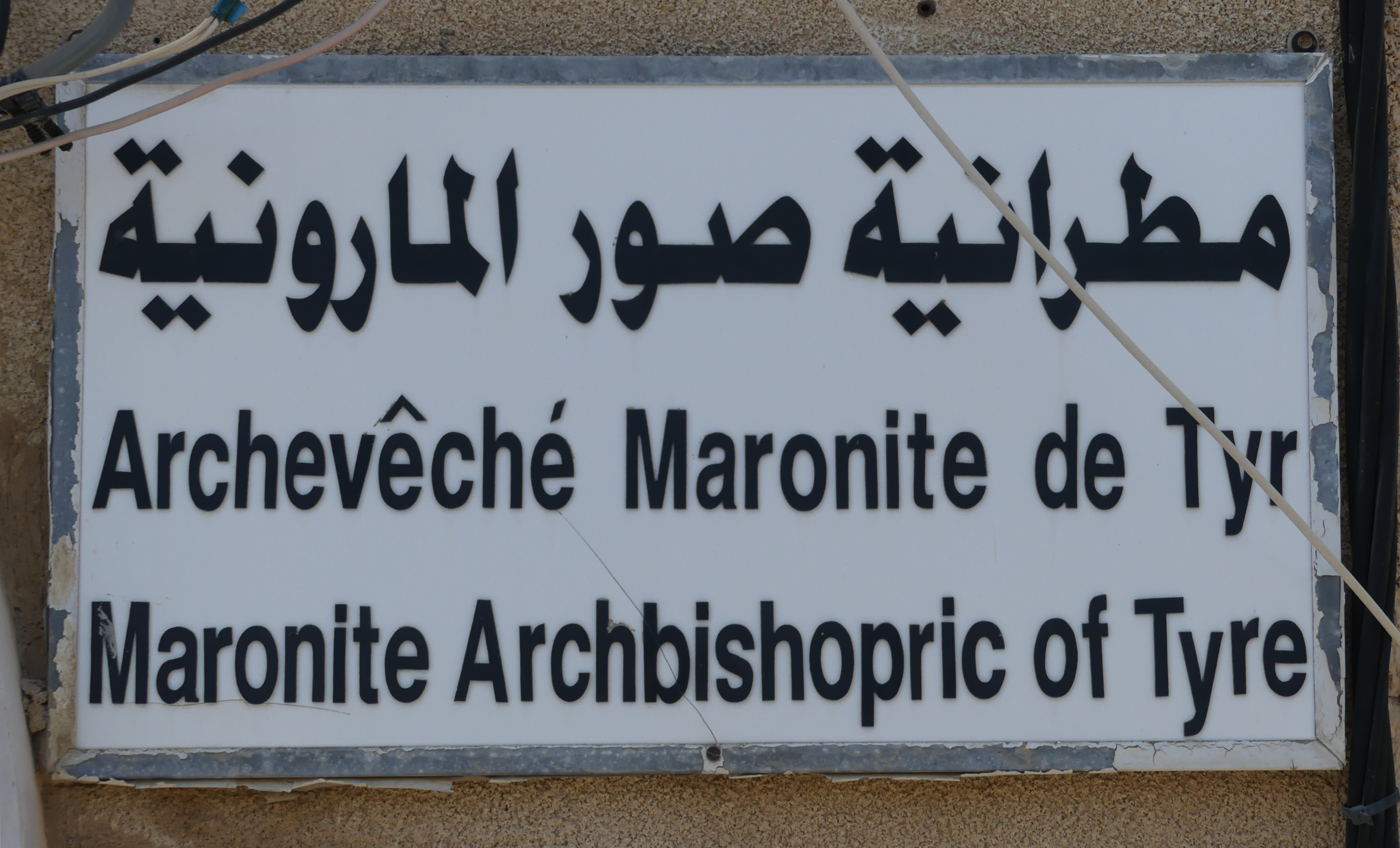
Sign at the seat of the Maronite Archeparchy

Following the end of the war in March 1991 based on the Taif Agreement, units of the Lebanese Army deployed along the coastal highway and around the Palestinian refugee camps of Tyre.

The long occupation left Southern Lebanon in general and Tyre in particular "depressed long after 1991 cease-fire" of the civil war, especially in economic terms. However, public life in Tyre relaxed after a couple of years when Hezbollah had tried to enforce an Islamist moral policing. Such attempts were stopped when Sayed Hassan Nasrallah rose to the top of the organisation in 1992.

In the 1992 elections, Kamil al-As'ad from the feudal dynasty of Ali al-Saghir headed a list that lost against Amal. Nasir al-Khalil, the son of Tyre's former longtime deputy Kazim al-Khalil who died in 1990, was not elected either and failed again in 1996.

In April 1996, Israel launched the sixteen-day campaign Operation Grapes of Wrath against Lebanon in an attempt to stop rocket attacks by Hezbollah. As part of the conflict, the Israeli Navy blockaded the harbour of Tyre. A UNIFIL convoy carrying food supplies to besieged villagers near Tyre was reportedly shelled by the IDF. Tyrian hospitals were overcrowded with civilian victims of bombardments throughout the conflict.

After Israeli shelling hit the UNIFIL compound in the nearby village of Qana on 18 April, killing 106 civilians and injuring another 116 (as well as 4 UN workers from Fiji), the central mourning ceremony was held in the Roman Hippodrome of Tyre following the ceasefire at the end of April. The number of attendants honouring the victims of the Qana massacre was estimated at more than 20.000, including Prime Minister Rafiq Hariri.

A few weeks later, the Maronite Archeparchy of Tyre gave up a portion of its traditional territory, as the Maronite Catholic Archeparchy of Haifa and the Holy Land was created. Until 1996, the archbishop had visited his flock across the Blue Line like in past centuries, when Tyre was part of a Greater Palestine with open borders. This cross-border mandate now became untenable.

In the 1998 Municipal Elections, Amal won "a startling victory of twenty one seats in Tyre" ahead of Hezbollah. Six years later, Amal held Tyre as its traditional stronghold, but lost support in the District of Tyre to Hezbollah.

===== 2006 Lebanon War =====
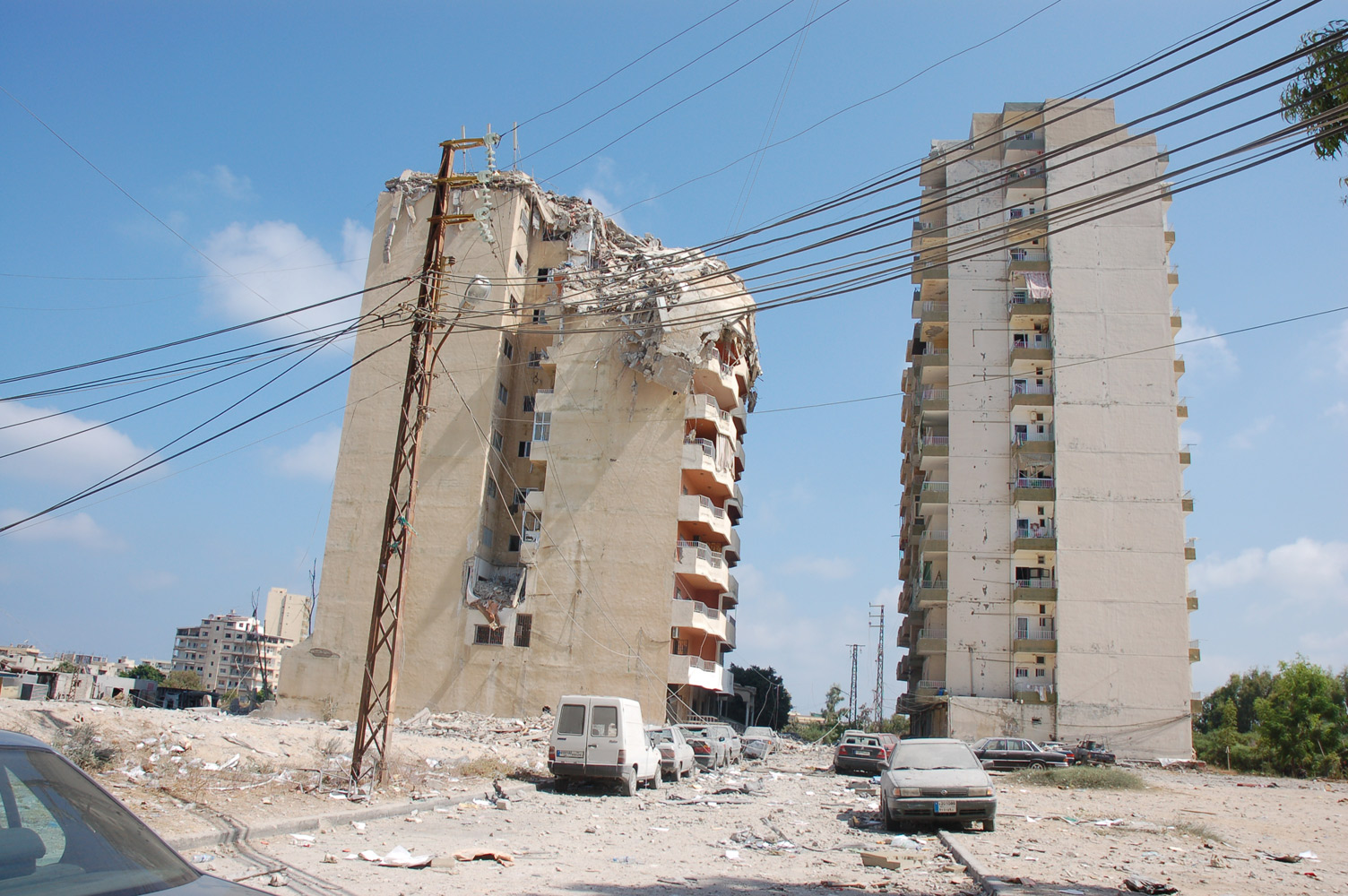
Aftermath of the IAF attack on Tyre that killed 14 civilians on 16 July 2006

During Israel's invasion in the July 2006 Lebanon War, several rocket-launching sites used by Hezbollah to attack Israel were located in rural areas around the city. IDF commandos raided a building on the outskirts of Tyre killing at least two Hezbollah fighters, and Shayetet 13 (Israeli naval commandos) also raided Hezbollah targets within the city.

While some Lebanese army soldiers were killed in such attacks as well, most of the victims were civilians. Tyre's hospital were overwhelmed with wounded victims of Israeli bombardments, as thousands of families tried to escape from all over Southern Lebanon towards the North. In addition to locals, there were also numberless members of the diaspora visiting at the height of the holiday season and now looking to flee the violence.

At least one village near the city was bombed by Israel as well as several sites within the city, causing civilian deaths and adding to the food shortage problem inside Tyre:

- On 16 July around noon a strike by the IAF on a residential apartment building behind the Jabal Amel Hospital – known as the Sidon Institute – at the outskirts of Tyre killed eight members of a family.
- At about the same time, five civilians were killed by another aerial assault on Burj El Shimali, including two children.
- Later in the afternoon of that same day, another airstrike on a multistorey apartment building in Tyre, which also housed the Civil Defense Forces, killed 14 civilians, amongst them a one-year-old girl and a Sri Lankan maid.
- On 21 July, army soldiers reportedly buried 72 victims in a mass grave in Tyre.
- On 25 July, two ambulances of the Lebanese Red Cross were hit by the IAF as they transported injured civilians to Tyre.

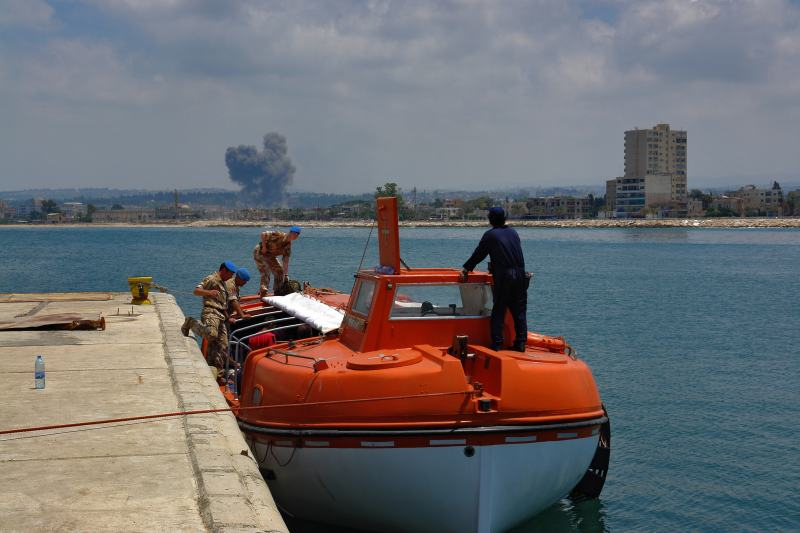
UNIFIL soldiers and staff from the cruise ship MV Serenade evacuate refugees from Tyre, 20 July 2006

UNIFIL troops helped with heavy bulldozers to clear debris from those bombardments.

On 8 August, ICRC President Jakob Kellenberger visited Tyre and held a press conference to highlight the plight of civilians. The event was held at the Murex Hotel where the ICRC sub-delegation was based. Two days later, Kellenberger told the media in Jerusalem that the Israeli prime minister Ehud Olmert pledged to allow an ICRC ship with food and medical supplies to enter the port of Tyre

After one month of fighting, on 11 August, the UN Security Council passed resolution 1701 calling on Hezbollah and Israel to cease all hostilities. It also created

a buffer zone free of "any armed personnel, assets and weapons other than those of the Government of Lebanon and of UNIFIL" between the United Nations–drawn Blue Line in southern Lebanon and the Litani River.

Yet, on 13 August, five more civilians were killed in Burj El Shimali, amongst them three children and one Sri Lankan maid. More heavy bombing took place on 19 August, just one day before a ceasefire was implemented.

==== Post–2006 War ====
Deployment of UNIFIL forces, 2018

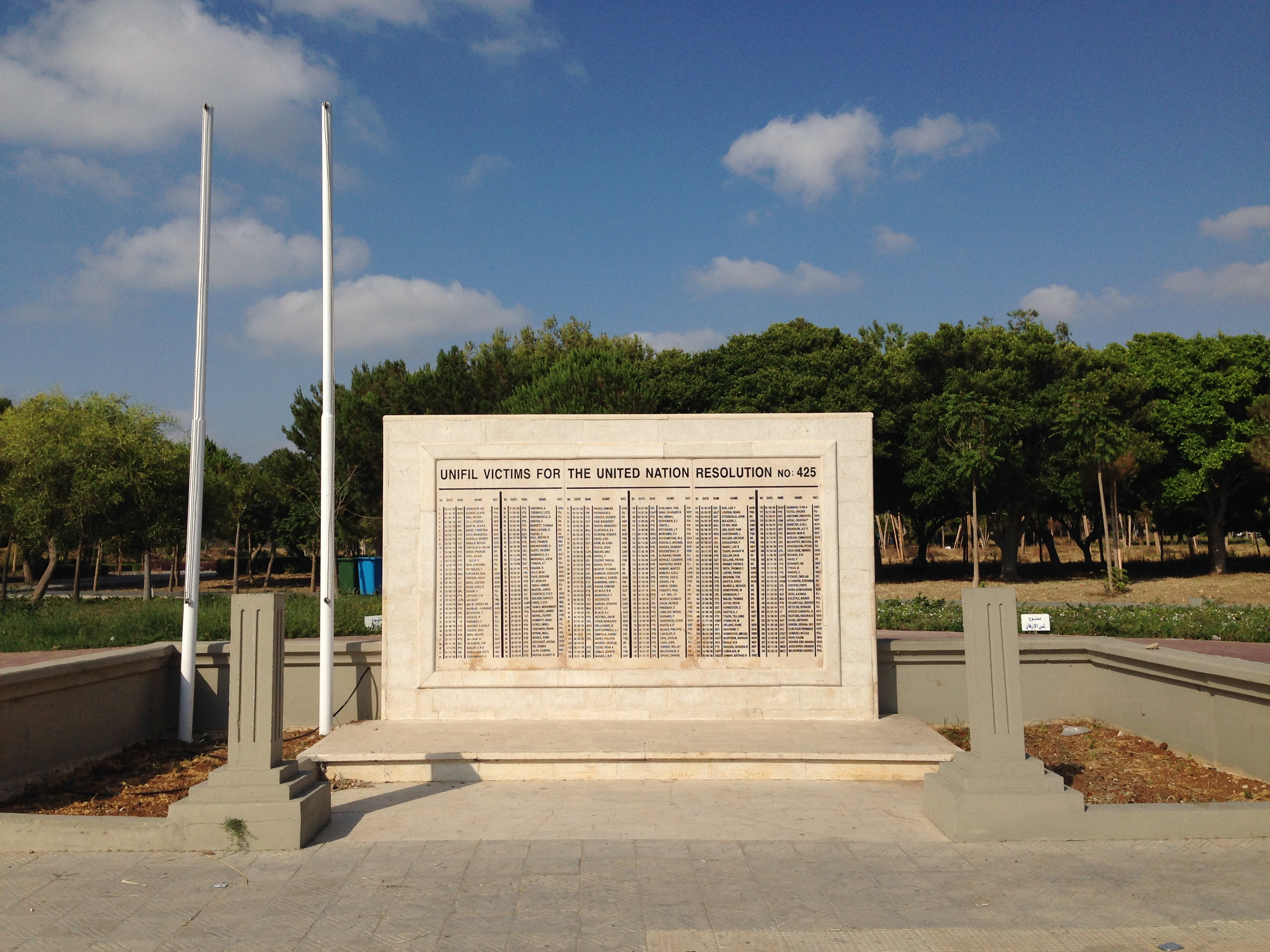
Unfinished memorial for the 314 UNIFIL casualties with an incomplete list of 209 names in Tyre, 2019

Still, in August 2006, Italian reinforcements for UNIFIL landed in amphibious craft on the shores of Tyre. While UNIFIL had a troops strength of about 2,000 at that point in time, the Security Council soon expanded the mandate of UNIFIL and increased it to a maximum of 15,000 troops. At least since then, Tyre city and its Southern surrounding areas have been part of the Italian UNIFIL sector, whereas its Northern surrounding areas have been part of the Korean sector. As UINIFIL has got a budget for small community projects as well, the Italian contingent in particular has supported a variety of civil society activities with great visibility.

The mayor of Tyre is Hassan Dbouk. Dbouk has decried a lack of capacities at the local government level, while arguing that

There is a complete absence of the central government here.

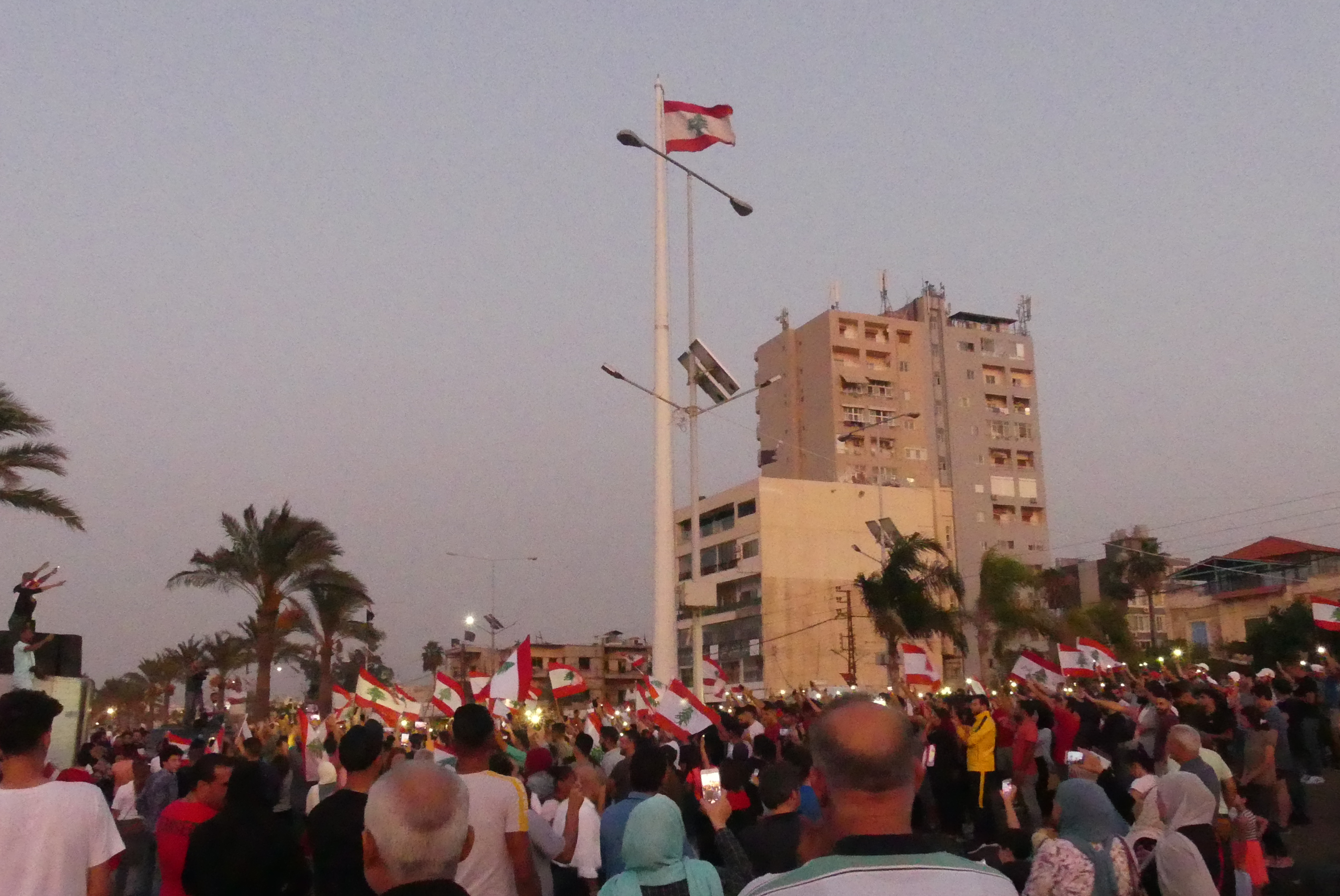
Elissa Square on 22 October 2019

In the 2018 parliamentary elections, the Tyre-Zahrani district had a 48.1% turnout out of 311,953 registered voters, but only two competing camps. The allied list of Hezbollah and Amal won all seven seats with a 92% landslide.

When the 2019–20 Lebanese protests against government corruption and austerity measures started across the country on 17 October 2019, masses of citizens flocked to the central Elissa Square – named after the legendary founder of Carthage – to join the nonsectarian demonstrations. The venue features the highest flagpole (32.6 meters ) in all of Lebanon with a national flag of 11 X 19 meters.

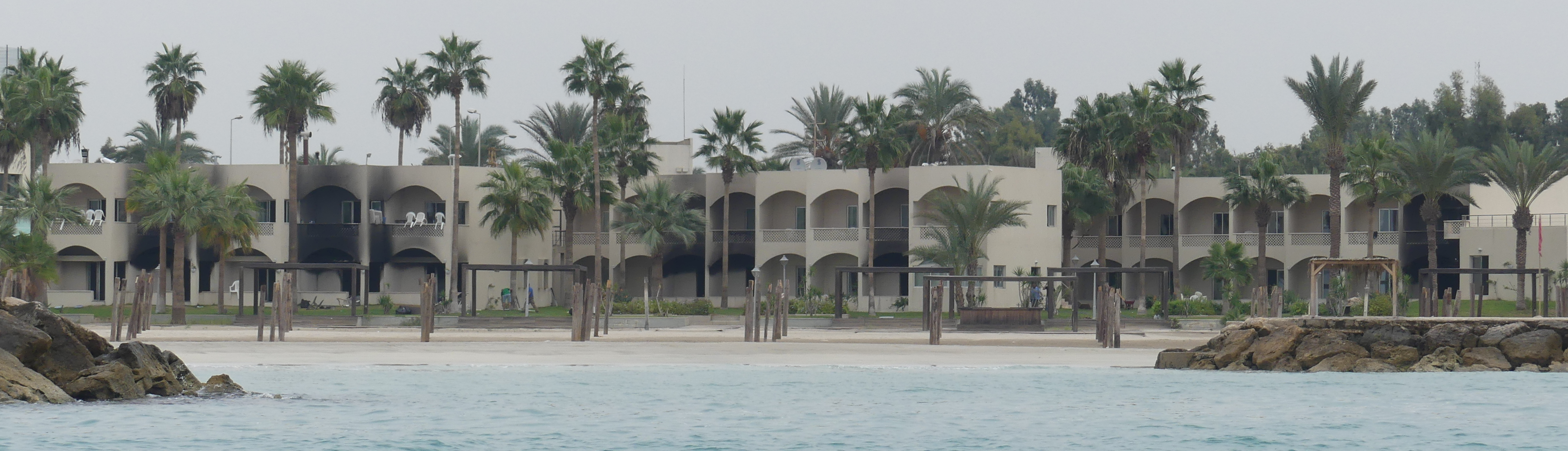
The ruins of the Rest House

One day later an arson attack devastated the Rest House hotel at Tyre beach, when a crowd of some 100 people vanadalised the beach resort, supposedly because of rumours that it was owned by Nabih Berri's wife Randa. 18 suspects were arrested. Another day later, a gang of armed men assaulted the protesters at Elissa Square. The attackers were reportedly supporters of the Amal Movement, which denied any involvement.

The protesters kept a tented presence inside the roundabout of Elissa Square for months. With the collapse of the Lebanese pound in the first months of 2020 they regained momentum in Tyre as across the country, turning public anger over hyperinflation increasingly towards banks: in one instance, a group of protesters, closed down a bank in Tyre "as a sign of civil disobedience", after its management refused to pay out money to a customer for the medical treatment of his mother. Then, in the early morning hours of April 26, three men threw Molotov cocktails towards a branch of the Credit Libanais bank, causing minor damages.

By 8 May 2020, the Disaster Management Unit registered 15 confirmed cases of the Coronavirus disease 2019, mostly detected amongst Lebanese repatriated from Africa. Less than a month later, this number had grown to 37 cases.

During the 2024 Israeli invasion of Lebanon, the Israeli military, starting in October 2024, began a bombardment campaign against the city, causing significant infrastructural damage. Over 86,000 of the city's 100,000 pre-war residents fled, leaving it "almost deserted". The city was previously considered a safe zone, with thousands of people from Southern Lebanon seeking refuge in the city after the Israeli invasion.

=== 2024 ===
On 23 October 2024, Israel hit Tyre with airstrikes, claiming to have been targeting Hezbollah militants, without providing evidence for their claims. According to Lebanon's National News Agency, the airstrikes caused “massive destruction and serious damage to homes, infrastructure, buildings, shops and cars". The Lebanese Ministry of Health said 16 people were wounded in Tyre and Tyre's disaster management unit said seven buildings were completely destroyed, with another 400 buildings damaged nearby.

=== 2026 Iran war ===
On 2 March 2026, Hezbollah launched rockets into Israel in retaliation for the Assassination of Ayatollah Ali Khamenei, drawing Lebanon into the 2026 Iran war. This was the first notable clash between the parties since the 2024 Israel–Lebanon ceasefire agreement.

On 31 March 2026, Israel ordered the residents of Southern Lebanon, including those living in Tyre, to move North of the Zahrani river, located around 40 kilometres (25 mi) north of the Israeli–Lebanese border.

On Thursday, 28 May 2026, Israel launched two strikes against Tyre and an area east of the city, according to Lebanon's National News Agency.

== Cited works ==
- Jidejian, Nina (2018). Tyre Through The Ages (3 ed.). Beirut: Librairie Orientale. pp. 119–141. ISBN 978-9953171050.
