= Poena cullei =

Execution practiced in ancient Rome

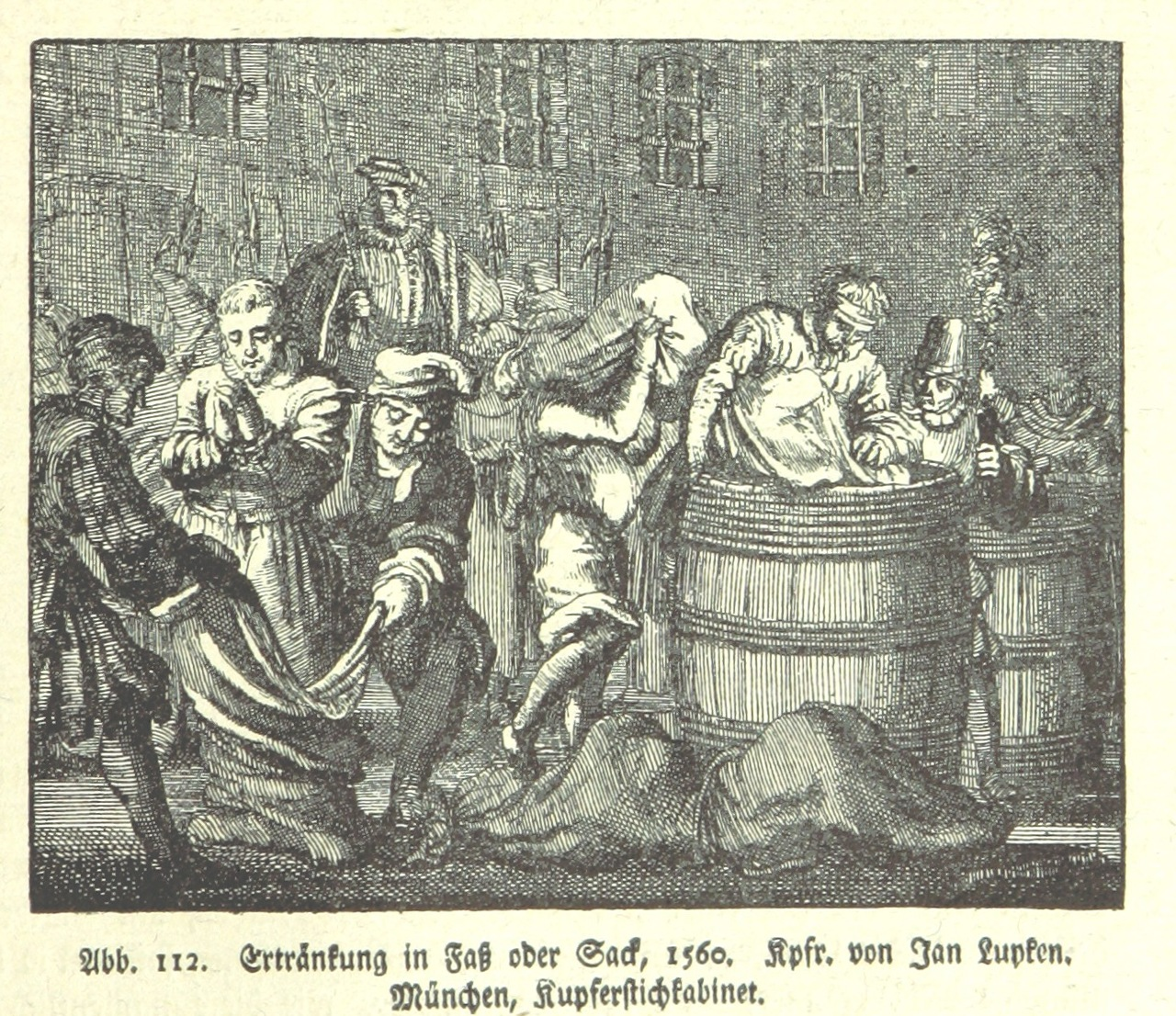
"Ertränkung in Faß oder Sack" ('Drowning in Barrel or Sack'), a 1560 sketch showing capital punishment

Poena cullei (Latin, 'penalty of the sack') under Roman law was a type of death penalty imposed on a subject who had been found guilty of parricide. The punishment consisted of being sewn up in a leather sack, with an assortment of live animals including a dog, snake, monkey, and a chicken or rooster, and then being thrown into water.

The punishment may have varied widely in its frequency and precise form during the Roman period. For example, the earliest fully documented case is from ca. 100 BC, although scholars think the punishment may have developed about a century earlier. Inclusion of live animals in the sack is only documented from Early Imperial times, and at the beginning, only snakes were mentioned. At the time of Emperor Hadrian (2nd century AD), the best-known form of the punishment was documented, where a rooster, a dog, a monkey and a viper were inserted in the sack. At the time of Hadrian, poena cullei was made into an optional form of punishment for parricide (the alternative was being thrown to the beasts in the arena).

During the 3rd century AD up to the accession of Emperor Constantine, poena cullei fell out of use; Constantine revived it, now with only serpents to be added in the sack. Well over 200 years later, Emperor Justinian reinstituted the punishment with the four animals, and poena cullei remained the statutory penalty for patricides within Byzantine law for the next 400 years, when it was replaced with being burned alive. Poena cullei gained a revival of sorts in late medieval and early modern Germany, with late cases of being drowned in a sack along with live animals being documented from Saxony in the first half of the 18th century.

== Execution ritual ==
The 19th-century historian Theodor Mommsen compiled and described in detail the various elements that at one time or another have been asserted as elements within the ritualistic execution of a patricide during the Roman Era, and while the following paragraph is based on that description it is not to be regarded as a static ritual that always was observed, but as a descriptive enumeration of elements gleaned from several sources written over a period of several centuries. Mommsen, for example, notes that the monkey hardly can have been an ancient element in the execution ritual.

The person was first whipped, or beaten, with virgis sanguinis ("blood-colored rods", probably) and his head was covered in a bag made of a wolf's hide. On his feet were placed clogs, or wooden shoes, and he was then put into the poena cullei, a sack made of ox-leather. Placed along with him into the sack was also an assortment of live animals, arguably the most famous combination being that of a serpent, a cock, a monkey and a dog. The sack was put on a cart, and the cart driven by black oxen to a running stream or to the sea. Then, the sack with its inhabitants was thrown into the water.

Other variations occur, and some of the Latin phrases have been interpreted differently. For example, in his early work De Inventione, Cicero says the criminal's mouth was covered by a leather bag, rather than a wolf's hide. He also says the person was held in prison until the large sack was made ready, whereas at least one modern author believes the sack, culleus, involved, would have been one of the large, very common sacks Romans transported wine in, so that such a sack would have been readily available. According to the same author, such a wine sack had a volume of 144.5 US gallons (547 L).

Another point of contention concerns precisely how, and by what means, the individual was beaten. In his 1920 essay "The Lex Pompeia and the Poena Cullei", Max Radin observes that, as expiation, convicts were typically flogged until they bled (some commentators translate the phrase as "beaten with rods till he bleeds"), but that it might very well be the case that the rods themselves were painted red. Radin also points to a third option, namely that the "rods" actually were some type of shrub, since it documented from other sources that whipping with some kinds of shrub was thought to be purifying in nature.

== Publicius Malleolus ==
The picture gained of the ritual above is compiled from sources ranging in their generally agreed upon dates of composition from the 1st century BC, to the 6th century AD, that is, over a period of six to seven hundred years. Different elements are mentioned in the various sources, so that the actual execution ritual at any one particular time may have been substantially distinct from that ritual performed at other times. For example, the Rhetorica ad Herennium, a treatise by an unknown author from about 90 BC details the execution of a Publicius Malleolus, found guilty of murdering his own mother, along with citing the relevant law as follows:

Another law says: "He who has been convicted of murdering his parent shall be completely wrapped and bound in a leather sack and thrown in a running stream"... Malleolus was convicted of matricide. Immediately after he had received sentence, his head was wrapped in a bag of wolf's hide, the "wooden shoes" were put upon his feet and he was led away to prison. His defenders bring tablets into the jail, write his will in his presence, witnesses duly attending. The penalty is exacted of him.

As can be seen from the above, in this early reference, no mention is made of live animals as co-inhabitants within the sack, nor is the mention of any initial whipping contained, nor that Malleolus, contained within the sack, was transported to the river in a cart driven by black oxen.

The Roman historian Livy places the execution of Malleolus to just about 10 years earlier than the composition of Rhetoricia ad Herennium (i.e., roughly 100 BC) and claims, furthermore, that Malleolus was the first in Roman history who was convicted to be sewn into a sack and thrown into the water, on account of parricide.

== Possible antecedents ==
The historians Dionysius of Halicarnassus and Valerius Maximus, connect the practice of poena cullei with an alleged incident under king Tarquinius Superbus (legendary reign being 535–509 BC). During his reign, the Roman state apparently acquired the so-called Sibylline Books, books of prophecy and sacred rituals. The king appointed a couple of priests, the so-called duumviri sacrorum, to guard the books, but one of them, Marcus Atilius, was bribed, and in consequence, divulged some of the book's secrets (to a certain Sabine foreigner Petronius, according to Valerius). For that breach of religion, Tarquinius had him sewn up in a sack and thrown into the sea. According to Valerius Maximus, it was very long after this event that this punishment was instituted for the crime of parricide as well, whereas Dionysius says that in addition to being suspected of divulging the secret texts, Atilius was, indeed, accused of having killed his own father.

The Greek historian Plutarch, however, in his "Life of Romulus" claims that the first case in Roman history of a son killing his own father happened more than five centuries after the foundation of Rome (traditional foundation date 753 BC), when a man called Lucius Hostius murdered his own father after the wars with Hannibal, that is, after the Second Punic War (which ended in 201 BC). Plutarch, however, does not specify how Lucius Hostius was executed, or even if he was executed by the Roman state at all. Additionally, he notes that at the time of Romulus and for the first centuries onwards, "parricide" was regarded as roughly synonymous with what is now called homicide, and that prior to the times of Lucius Hostius, the murder of one's own father, (i.e., patricide), was simply morally "unthinkable".

According to Cloud and other modern scholars of Roman classical antiquity, a fundamental shift in the punishment of murderers may have occurred towards the end of the 3rd century BC, possibly spurred on by specific incidents like that of Lucius Hostius' murder of his father, and, more generally, occasioned by the concomitant brutalization of society in the wake of the protracted wars with Hannibal. Previously, murderers would have been handed over to the family of the victim to exact their vengeance, whereas from the 2nd century BC and onwards, the punishment of murderers became the affair of the Roman state, rather than giving the offended family full licence to mete out what they deemed appropriate punishment to the murderer of a relative. Within that particular context, Cloud points out that certain jokes contained in the plays of the early 2nd century dramatist Plautus may be read as referring to the recent introduction of the punishment by the sack for parricides specifically (without the animals being involved).

Yet another incident prior to the execution of Malleolus is relevant. Some 30 years before the times of Malleolus, in the upheavals and riotings caused by the reform program urged on by Tiberius Gracchus, a man called Caius Villius, an ally of Gracchus, was condemned on some charge, and was shut up in a vessel or jar, to which serpents were added, and he was killed in that manner.

== First-century BC legislation ==
Two laws documented from the first century BC are principally relevant to Roman murder legislation in general, and legislation on parricide in particular. These are the Lex Cornelia De Sicariis, promulgated in the 80s BC, and the Lex Pompeia de Parricidiis promulgated about 55 BC. According to a 19th-century commentator, the relation between these two old laws might have been that it was the Lex Pompeia that specified the poena cullei (i.e., sewing the convict up in a sack and throwing him in the water) as the particular punishment for a parricide, because a direct reference to the Lex Cornelia shows that the typical punishment for a poisoner or assassin in general (rather than for the specific crime of parricide) was that of banishment, i.e., Lex Pompeia makes explicit distinctions for the crime of parricide not present in Lex Cornelia.

Support for a possible distinction in the inferred contents of Lex Cornelia and Lex Pompeia from the remaining primary source material may be found in comments by the 3rd-century AD jurist Aelius Marcianus, as preserved in the 6th-century collection of juristical sayings, the Digest:

By the lex Pompeia on parricides it is laid down that if anyone kills his father, his mother, his grandfather, his grandmother, his brother, his sister, first cousin on his father's side, first cousin on his mother's side, paternal or maternal uncle, paternal (or maternal) aunt, first cousin (male or female) by mother's sister, wife, husband, father-in-law, son-in-law, mother-in-law, (daughter-in-law), stepfather, stepson, stepdaughter, patron, or patroness, or with malicious intent brings this about, shall be liable to the same penalty as that of the lex Cornelia on murderers. And a mother who kills her son or daughter suffers the penalty of the same statute, as does a grandfather who kills a grandson; and in addition, a person who buys poison to give to his father, even though he is unable to administer it.

Modern experts continue to have some disagreements as to the actual meaning of the offence called "parricide", on the precise relation between the Lex Cornelia and the Lex Pompeia generally, and on the practice and form of the poena cullei specifically. For example, Kyle (2012) summarizes, in a footnote, one of the contemporary relevant controversies in the following manner:

Cloud (1971), 42–66, suggests that Pompey's law on parricide, the Lex Pompeia de Parricidiis (Dig. 48.9.1), probably of 55 or 52 BC defined parricide in terms of the murder of parents or close relatives, assimilated it with other forms of homicide, and suspended the sack and replaced it with the interdictio; but see Bauman's cautions, (1996) 30–2, about whether Pompey changed the nature of the penalty

== Writings of Marcus Tullius Cicero ==
Marcus Tullius Cicero, the renowned lawyer, orator and politician from the 1st century BC, provides in his copious writings several references to the punishment of poena cullei, but none of the live animals documented within the writings by others from later periods. In his defence speech of 80 BC for Sextus Roscius (accused of having murdered his own father), he expounds on the symbolic importance of the punishment as follows, for example, as Cicero believed it was devised and designed by the previous Roman generations:

They therefore stipulated that parricides should be sewn up in a sack while still alive and thrown into a river. What remarkable wisdom they showed, gentlemen! Do they not seem to have cut the parricide off and separated him from the whole realm of nature, depriving him at a stroke of sky, sun, water and earth – and thus ensuring that he who had killed the man who gave him life should himself be denied the elements from which, it is said, all life derives? They did not want his body to be exposed to wild animals, in case the animals should turn more savage after coming into contact with such a monstrosity. Nor did they want to throw him naked into a river, for fear that his body, carried down to the sea, might pollute that very element by which all other defilements are thought to be purified. In short, there is nothing so cheap, or so commonly available that they allowed parricides to share in it. For what is so free as air to the living, earth to the dead, the sea to those tossed by the waves, or the land to those cast to the shores? Yet these men live, while they can, without being able to draw breath from the open air; they die without earth touching their bones; they are tossed by the waves without ever being cleansed; and in the end they are cast ashore without being granted, even on the rocks, a resting-place in death.

That the practice of sewing murderers of their parents in sacks and throwing them in the water was still an active type of punishment at Cicero's time, at least on the provincial level, is made clear within a preserved letter Marcus wrote to his own brother Quintus, who as governor in Asia Minor in the 50s BC had, in fact, meted out that precise punishment to two locals in Smyrna, as Marcus observes.

== Julio-Claudian Dynasty, the two Senecas and Juvenal ==
In whatever form or frequency the punishment of the sack was actually practiced in late Republican Rome or early Imperial Rome, the historian Suetonius, in his biography of Octavian, that is the Emperor Augustus (r.27 BC–14 AD), Div. Aug. 33.1, notes the following reluctance on the emperor's part to actively authorize, and effect, that dread penalty:

Furthermore, he administered justice not only with the utmost care but also with compassion as is illustrated in the case of a defendant clearly guilty of parricide; to keep him from being sewn into the sack (only those who confessed suffered this punishment) Augustus reportedly asked, "Surely you did not kill your father?"

Quite the opposite mentality seems to have been the case with Emperor Claudius (r.41 – 54 AD) For example, Emperor Nero's mentor, Seneca the Younger sighed about the times of Claudius as follows:

The Emperor Claudius sewed more men into the culleus in five years than history says were sewn up in all previous centuries. We saw more cullei than crucifixions.

It is also with a writer like Seneca that serpents are mentioned in context with the punishment;. Even before Seneca the Younger, his father, Seneca the Elder, who lived in the reigns of Augustus, Tiberius and Caligula, indicates in a comment that snakes would be put in the culleus:

The postponement of my punishment was unpleasant: waiting for it seem worse than suffering it. I kept imagining the culleus, the snake, the deep.

The rather later satirist Juvenal (born, probably, in the 50s AD) also provides evidence for the monkey, he even pities the monkey, at one point, as an innocent sufferer. Not so with how Emperor Nero was reviled. In one play, Juvenal suggests that for Nero, being put in merely one sack is not good enough. This might, for example, be a reference both to the death of Nero's mother Agrippina Minor, widely believed to have been murdered on Nero's orders, and also to how Nero murdered his fatherland. Not only Juvenal thought the sack was the standard by which the appropriate punishment for Nero should be measured; the statues of Nero were despoiled and vandalized, and according to the Roman historian Suetonius, one statue was draped in a sack given a placard that said "I have done what I could. But you deserve the sack!".

== Emperor Hadrian and later jurists ==
It is within the law collection Digest 48.9.9 that perhaps the most famous formulation of the poena cullei is retained, from the sayings of the mid-3rd-century CE jurist Modestinus. In Olivia Robinson's translation, it reads:

According to the custom of our ancestors, the punishment instituted for parricide was as follows; A parricide is flogged with blood-colored rods, then sewn up in a sack with a dog, a dunghill cock, a viper, and a monkey; then the sack is thrown into the depths of the sea. This is the procedure if the sea is close at hand; otherwise, he is thrown to the beasts, according to the constitution of the deified Hadrian.

Thus, it is seen in the time of Emperor Hadrian (r.117–138 CE), the punishment for parricide was basically made optional, in that the convict might be thrown into the arena instead. Furthermore, a rescript from Hadrian is preserved in the 4th-century CE grammarian Dositheus Magister that contains the information that the cart with the sack and its live contents was driven by black oxen.

In the time of the late 3rd-century CE jurist Paulus, he said that the poena cullei had fallen out of use, and that parricides were either burnt alive or thrown to the beasts instead.

However, although Paulus regards the punishment of poena cullei as obsolete in his day, the church father Eusebius, in his "Martyrs of Palestine" notes a case of a Christian man Ulpianus in Tyre who was "cruelly scourged" and then placed in a raw ox-hide, together with a dog and a venomous serpent and cast in the sea. The incident is said to have taken place in 304 CE.

== Revival by Constantine the Great ==
On account of Paulus' comment, several scholars think the punishment of poena cullei fell out of use in the 3rd century CE, but the punishment was revived, and made broader (by including fathers who killed their children as liable to the punishment) by Emperor Constantine in a rescript from 318 CE. This rescript was retained in the 6th-century Codex Justinianus and reads as follows:

Emperor Constantine to Verinus, Vicar of Africa.

Whoever, secretly or openly, shall hasten the death of a parent, or son or other near relative, whose murder is accounted as parricide, will suffer the penalty of parricide. He will not be punished by the sword, by fire or by some other ordinary form of execution, but he will be sewn up in a sack and, in this dismal prison, have serpents as his companions. Depending on the nature of the locality, he shall be thrown into the neighboring sea or into the river, so that even while living he may be deprived of the enjoyment of the elements, the air being denied him while living and interment in the earth when dead.

Given November 16 (318).

== Legislation of Justinian ==
The Corpus Juris Civilis, the later name for the massive body of law promulgated by Emperor Justinian from the 530s CE and onwards, consists of two historical collections of laws and their interpretation (the Digest, opinions of the pre-eminent lawyers from the past, and the Code, a collection of edicts and rescripts by earlier emperors), along with Justinian's introductory text for students of law (the Institutes), plus Justinian's own, later edicts (the Novels). The earlier collections were meant to be sources for the actual, current practice of law, rather than just being of historical interest. This can be seen, for example, from the inclusion and modification of Modestinus' famous description of the poena cullei (Digest 48.9.9). In the Institutes (4.18.6), the Pompeian Act on Parricide "visits a rare punishment on the terrible crime of parricide", providing that

anyone who dares openly or secretly to hasten the end of an ascendant or son or any relative within the term 'parricide', and anyone who intentionally procures such a death, and any co-conspirator even if outside the family, shall suffer the punishment for parricide: he is not put to the sword, nor to the fire, nor to any other custom-hallowed death, but is sewn into a sack with a dog, a cock, a snake, and a monkey; and, sealed in with those bestial intimates, he is thrown, as the nature of the place allows, into a nearby sea or river. In this way while he still lives he loses the use of every element; the sky is taken from him before he dies, and the earth is denied him when he is dead. On the other hand, if anyone kills a relation by blood or marriage outside the parricide degrees, h[e] is dealt with under the Cornelian Act on Assassins.

It is seen that Justinian regards this as a novel enactment of an old law, and that he includes not only the symbolic interpretations of the punishment as found for example in Cicero, but also Constantine's extension of the penalty to fathers who murder their own children. In Justinian, relative to Constantine, we see the inclusion in the sack of a dog, a cock and a monkey, and not just Constantine's serpent(s). Some modern historians, such as O.F. Robinson, suspects that the precise wording of the text in Institutes 4.18.6 suggests that the claimed reference in Digest 48.9.9 from Modestinus is actually a sixth-century interpolation into the third-century text, rather than being a faithful citation of Modestinus.

=== Abolition ===
The poena cullei was eliminated as the punishment for parricides within the Byzantine Empire in the law code Basilika, promulgated more than 300 years after the time of Justinian, around 892 AD. However, Margaret Trenchard-Smith notes in her essay "Insanity, Exculpation and Disempowerment" that "this does not necessarily denote a softening of attitude. According to the Synopsis Basilicorum (an abridged edition of Basilika), parricides are to be cast into the flames."

== German revival in the Middle Ages and beyond ==
The penalty of the sack, with animals included, experienced a revival in parts of late medieval and early modern Germany, particularly in Saxony. The 14th-century commentator on the 13th-century compilation of laws/customs Sachsenspiegel, Johann von Buch, for example, states that the poena cullei is the appropriate punishment for parricides. Some differences evolved within the German ritual, relative to the original Roman ritual. Apparently, the cock was not included, the serpent might be replaced with a painting of a serpent on a piece of paper, and the monkey could be replaced with a cat. Furthermore, the cat and the dog were sometimes physically separated from the person, and the sack itself (with its two partitions) was made of linen, rather than of leather.

The difference between using linen, rather than leather, is that linen soaks easily, and the inhabitants will drown, whereas a leather sack could be made watertight and death would then be by suffocation—or death by a drawn-out drowning process rather than relatively quickly, simply by drowning. In a 1548 case from Dresden, the intention was to suffocate the culprit (who had killed his mother), rather than simply drown him. With him into the leather sack went a cat and a dog, and the sack was made airtight by coating it with pitch. However, the sack chosen was too small, and had been overstretched, so as the sack hit the water after being thrown from the bridge, it ripped open. The cat and the dog managed to swim away and survive, while the criminal (presumably bound) "got his punishment rather earlier than had been the intention"—that is, death simply by drowning.

The last case where this punishment is alleged, by some, to have been meted out was in 1734, somewhere in Saxony. Another tradition, however, is evidenced from the Saxonian city Zittau, where the last case is alleged to have happened in 1749. In at least one case in Zittau, in 1712, a non-venomous colubrid snake was used. The Zittau ritual was to put the victims in a black sack, and keep it under water for no less than six hours. In the meantime, the choir girls in town had the duty of singing the Psalm composed by Martin Luther, "Aus tiefer Not schrei ich zu dir" (From deep affliction I cry out to you). The punishment of the sack was expressly abolished in Saxony by a rescript dated 17 June 1761.

== From Chinese accounts ==
The Wenxian Tongkao, written by Chinese historian Ma Duanlin (1245–1322), and the History of Song describe how the Byzantine emperor Michael VII Parapinakēs Caesar (滅力沙靈改撒) of Fu lin (拂菻, i.e. Byzantium) sent an embassy to China's Song dynasty, arriving in November 1081, during the reign of Emperor Shenzong of Song (r. 1067–1085). The History of Song described the tributary gifts given by the Byzantine embassy as well as the products made in Byzantium. It also described forms of punishment in Byzantine law, such as caning, as well as the capital punishment of being stuffed into a "feather bag" and thrown into the sea. This description seems to correspond with the Romano-Byzantine punishment of poena cullei.

== Modern fiction ==
In his (1991) novel Roman Blood, Steven Saylor renders a fictionalized, yet informed, rendition of how the Roman punishment poena cullei might occur.

China Miéville's short story "Säcken", collected in Three Moments of an Explosion: Stories, is a modern horror story which incorporates the punishment.

== Bibliography ==
Books and journals

- Auler, Jost (2012). Richtstättenarchäologie 3. Dormagen: archeotopos Buchverlag. ISBN 978-3-938473-17-7.
- Böhmer, Dr. Ge. Wilh. (1820). "Ueber die Wahl der Todesstrafen, Zweiter Abschnitt". Archiv des Criminalrechts. 11. Halle: Hemmerde und Schwetschke.
- Bradley, Mark (2012). Rome, Pollution and Propriety: Dirt, Disease and Hygiene in the Eternal City from Antiquity to Modernity. Cambridge: Cambridge University Press. ISBN 978-1-107-01443-5.
- Caplan, Harry (tr.) (1954). Ad C. Herennium de ratione dicendi (Rhetorica ad Herennium). London, Cambridge;Mass.: Heinemann, Harvard University Press.
- Cicero, Marcus Tullius; Watson, J.S. (tr.) (1871). Cicero on Oratory and Orators: With his Letters to Quintus and Brutus. London: Bell&Daldy.
- Cicero, Marcus Tullius; Yonge, C.D. (tr.) (1852). The Orations of Marcus Tullius Cicero. London: Henry G. Bohn.
- Dionysius of Halicarnassus; Spelman, Edward (tr.) (1758). The Roman antiquities of Dionysius Halicarnassensis, Volume 2. London.
- Elliott, Neil; Reasoner, Mark (2011). Documents and Images for the Study of Paul. Minneapolis, MN: Fortress Press. ISBN 978-1-4514-1514-8.
- Eusebius of Caesarea; Cureton, William (1861). History of the Martyrs in Palestine: Discovered in a Very Antient Syriac Manuscript. London, Paris: Williams and Norgate, C.Borrani.
- Francese, Christopher (2007). Ancient Rome in So Many Words. New York, NY: Hippocrene Books. ISBN 978-0-7818-1153-8.
- Gaughan, Judy E. (2010). Murder Was Not a Crime: Homicide and Power in the Roman Republic. Austin, TX: University of Texas Press. ISBN 978-0-292-77992-1.
- Grimm, Jacob (1828). Deutsche Rechtsalterthuemer. Göttingen: Dieterichsche Buchhandlung.
- Juvenal, Decimus Junius; Gifford, William (tr.); Nuttall, P. Austin (1836). The Satires of Decimus Junius Juvenalis. London: Nuttall, self-published.
- Kahn, Arthur D. (2005). Byron's Single Difference with Homer and Virgil: And Other Essays on the Poet's Interplay with the Literatures of Greece and Rome. Bloomington, Indiana: AuthorHouse. ISBN 978-1-4634-8046-2.
- Kyle, Donald C. (2012). Spectacles of Death in Ancient Rome. Oxford: Routledge. ISBN 978-1-134-86271-9.
- Lintott, Andrew W. (1999). Violence in Republican Rome. Oxford: Oxford University Press. ISBN 978-0-19-815282-8.
- Livy; Baker, George (tr.) (1797). The History of Rome, volume 6. London: A. Strahan and T. Cadell jun. and W. Davies.
- Long, George (1855). M. Tullii Ciceronis Orationes, Volume 2. London: Whittaker and Company, G. Bell.
- Mommsen, Theodor (1899). Römisches Strafrecht. Leipzig: Duncker&Humblot.
- Pescheck, Christian A. (1837). Handbuch der Geschichte von Zittau, Volume 2. Zittau: in Commission der J. D. Schöpfischen Buch- und Kunsthandlung.
- Plutarch; Dryden, John (tr.) (2008). Plutarch's Lives of Illustrious Men, Volume 1. Wildside Press LLC. ISBN 978-1-4344-7533-6.
- Plutarch; Stadter, Philip A.(tr.) (1999). Roman Lives: A Selection of Eight Lives. Oxford: Oxford University Press. ISBN 978-0-19-160508-6.
- Radin, Max (1920). "The Lex Pompeia and the Poena Cullei". Journal of Roman Studies. 10: 119–130. doi:10.2307/295798. ISSN 0075-4358. JSTOR 295798.
- Robinson, O.F. (2007). Penal Practice and Penal Policy in Ancient Rome. Oxford: Taylor & Francis. ISBN 978-0-203-96554-2.
- Saylor, Steven (2011). Roman Blood. Constable & Robinson Ltd. ISBN 978-1-84901-985-9.
- Scarborough, Connie (2012). "Women as Victims and Criminals in the Siete Partidas". In Classen, Albrecht; Scarborough, Connie (eds.). Crime and Punishment in the Middle Ages and Early Modern Age: Mental-Historical Investigations of Basic Human Problems and Social Responses. Berlin, Boston: Walter de Gruyter. pp. 225–246. ISBN 9783110294583.
- Suetonius; Hurley, Donna W.(tr.) (2011). The Caesars. Indianapolis, IN: Hackett Publishing. ISBN 978-1-60384-613-4.
- Trenchard-Smith, Margaret (2010). Turner, Wendy (ed.). Madness in Medieval Law and Custom. Leiden: BRILL. ISBN 978-90-04-18749-8.
- Valerius Maximus; Walker, Henry J. (tr.) (2004). Memorable Deeds and Sayings: One Thousand Tales from Ancient Rome. Indianapolis, IN: Hackett Publishing. ISBN 978-0-87220-674-8.
- Varner, Eric R. (2004). Monumenta Graeca et Romana: Mutilation and transformation : damnatio memoriae and Roman imperial portraiture. Leiden: BRILL. ISBN 978-90-04-13577-2.
- Watson, Alan, ed. (1998). The Digest of Justinian, Volume 4, Book 48. Translated by Robinson, Olivia. Philadelphia: University of Pennsylvania Press. ISBN 978-0-8122-2036-0.
- Weck, Antonius (1680). "Der" Chur-Fürstlichen Sächsischen weitberuffenen Residentz- und Haupt-Vestung Dresden Beschreib- und Vorstellung. Dresden: Hoffmann.
- Weiske, Julius (1833). Handbuch der Strafgesetze des Königreiches Sachsen von 1572 bis auf die neueste Zeit. Leipzig: Gustav Schaarschmidt.

Web resources

- Blume, Fred H. "Annotated Justinian Code". George W. Hopper Law Library. Kearley, Timothy, at College of Law George William Hopper Law Library.
- Mertens, A. "Who was a Chistian in the Holy Land?". www.christusrex.org. Christus Rex, Inc.
- Moyle, J. B. "Justinian, Institutes" (PDF). amesfoundation.law.harvard.edu. Ames Foundation, Harvard University.
- Scott, S. P. "The Enactments of Justinian. The Digest or Pandects". The Roman Law Library. Y. Lassard & A. Koptev.
