= Gaius (jurist) =

Roman jurist (2nd century AD)

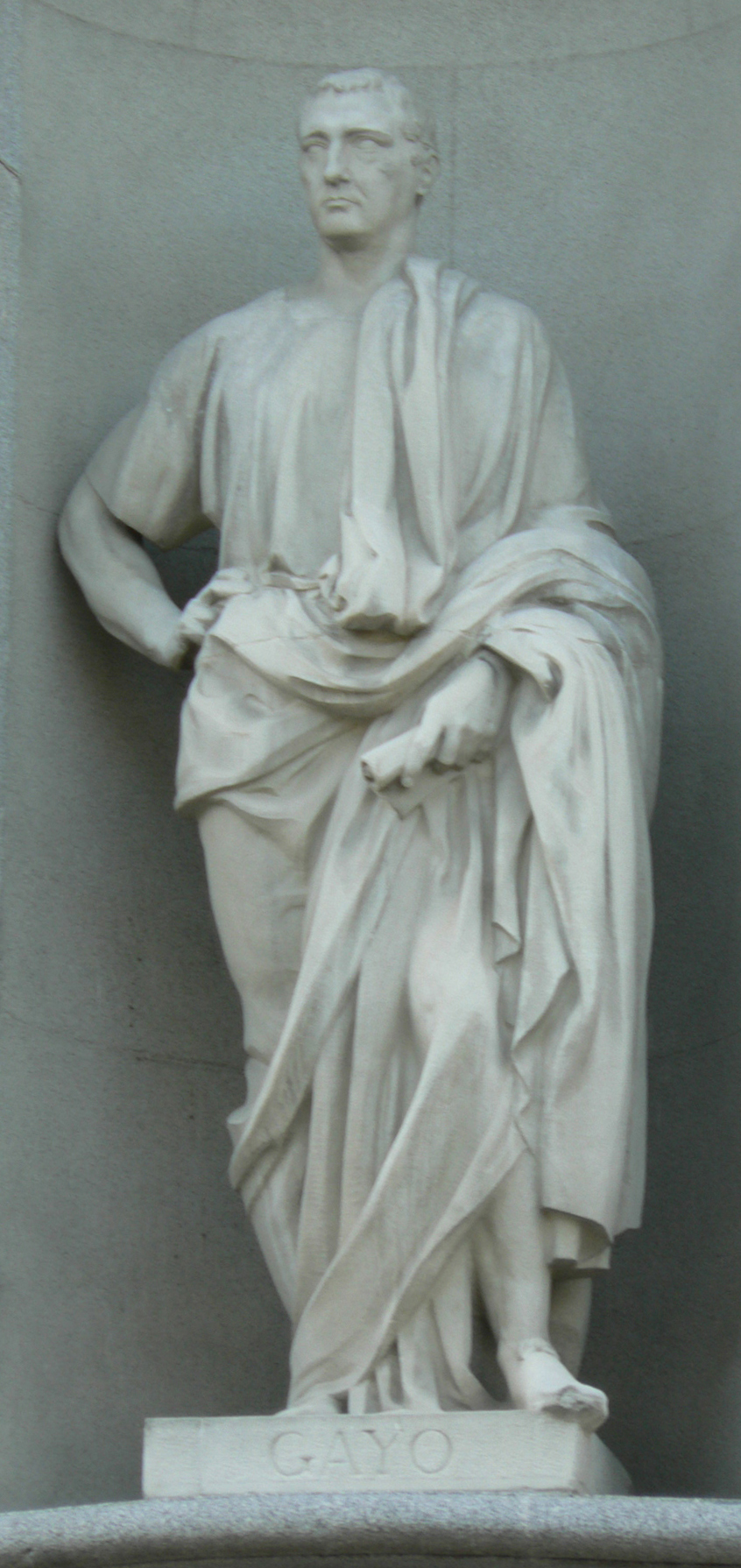
Roman jurist Gaius or Caius

Gaius (/ˈɡeɪəs/; fl. AD 130–180) was a Roman jurist. Little is known about his personal life, including his name (Gaius or Caius being merely his personal name or praenomen). It is also difficult to ascertain the span of his life, but it is assumed he lived from AD 130 to at least AD 179, as he wrote on legislation passed within that time.

From internal evidence in his works it may be gathered that he flourished in the reigns of the emperors Hadrian, Antoninus Pius, Marcus Aurelius and Commodus. His works were thus composed between the years 130 and 180. After his death, however, his writings were recognized as of great authority, and the emperor Theodosius II named him in the Law of Citations, along with Papinian, Ulpian, Modestinus and Paulus, as one of the five jurists whose opinions were to be followed by judicial officers in deciding cases. The works of these jurists accordingly became most important sources of Roman law.

Besides the Institutes, which are a complete exposition of the elements of Roman law, Gaius was the author of treatises on the Edicts of the Magistrates, on the Twelve Tables (Ad Legem XII Tabularum), on the important Lex Papia Poppaea, and on several other topics. His interest in the antiquities of Roman law is apparent, and for this reason his work is most valuable to the historian of early institutions. In the disputes between the two schools of Roman jurists he generally attached himself to that of the Sabinians, who were said to be followers of Ateius Capito, of whose life we have some account in the Annals of Tacitus, and to advocate a strict adherence as far as possible to ancient rules, and to resist innovation. Many quotations from the works of Gaius occur in the Digest, created by Tribonian at the direction of Justinian I, and so acquired a permanent place in the system of Roman law; while a comparison of the Institutes of Justinian with those of Gaius shows that the whole method and arrangement of the later work were copied from that of the earlier, and very numerous passages are word for word the same. The Digest and the Institutes of Justinian are part of the Corpus Juris Civilis. Probably, for the greater part of the period of three centuries which elapsed between Gaius and Justinian, his Institutes had been the familiar textbook for all students of Roman law.

== The Institutes ==
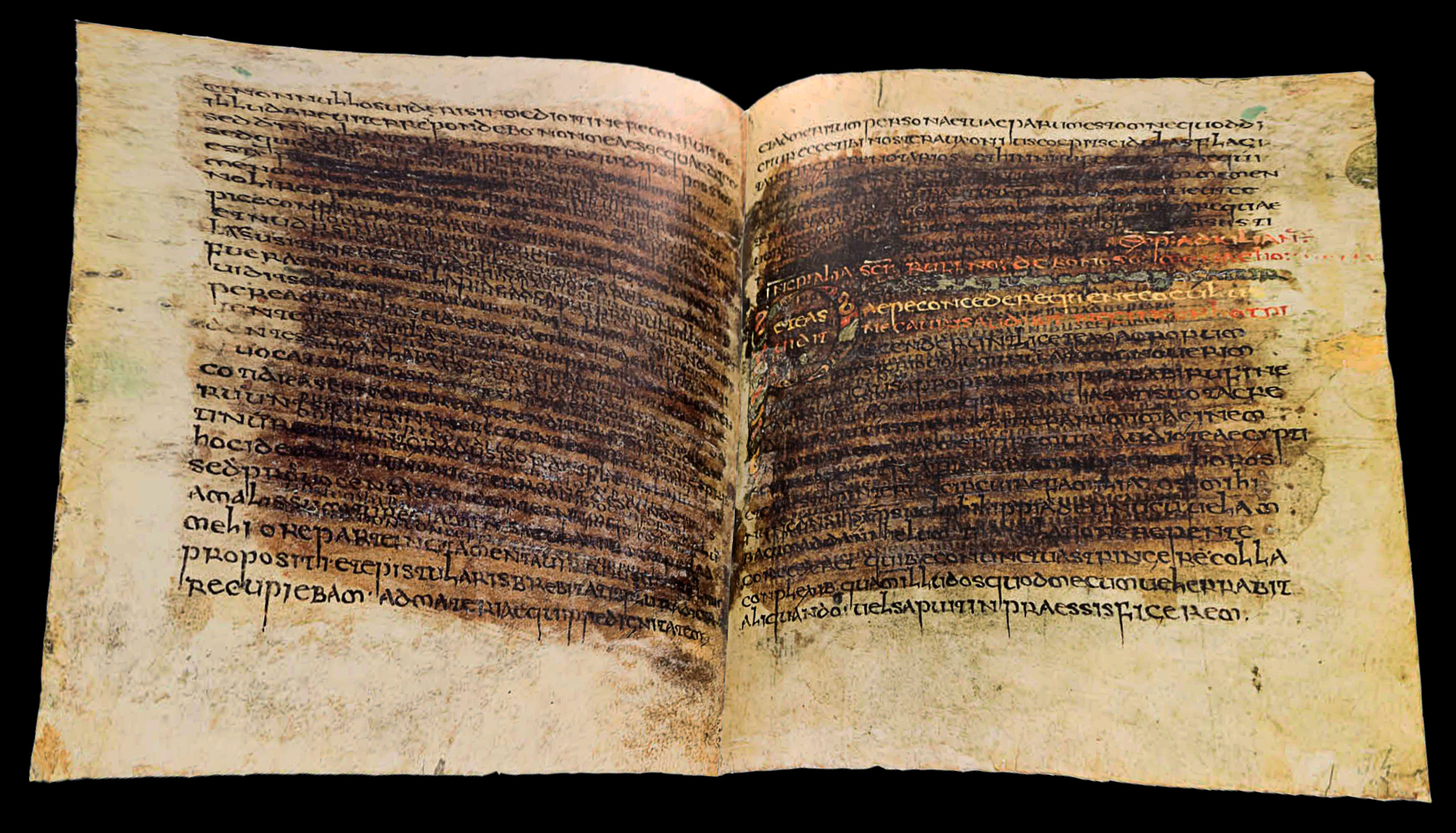
Codex Veronensis contains Gaius' Institutes and was copied around 500

The Institutes of Gaius, written about the year AD 161, was an introductory textbook of legal institutions divided into four books: the first treating of persons and the differences of the status they may occupy in the eye of the law; the second of things, and the modes in which rights over them may be acquired, including the law relating to wills; the third of intestate succession and of obligations; and the fourth of actions and their forms.

Another circumstance which renders the work of Gaius more interesting to the historical student than that of Justinian, is that Gaius lived at a time when actions were tried by the system of formulae, or formal directions given by the praetor before whom the case first came, to the judex to whom he referred it. Without a knowledge of the terms of these formulae it is impossible to solve the most interesting question in the history of Roman law, and show how the rigid rules peculiar to the ancient law of Rome were modified by what has been called the equitable jurisdiction of the praetors, and made applicable to new conditions, and brought into harmony with the notions and the needs of a more developed society. It is clear from evidence of Gaius that this result was obtained, not by an independent set of courts administering, as in England previous to the Judicature Acts, a system different from that of the ordinary courts, but by the manipulation of the formulae. In the time of Justinian the work was complete, and the formulary system had disappeared.

The work was lost to modern scholars, until, in 1816, a palimpsest was discovered by B. G. Niebuhr in the chapter library of Verona, in which some of the works of St. Jerome were written over some earlier writings, which proved to be the lost work of Gaius. The greater part of the palimpsest has, however, been deciphered with the help of August von Bethmann-Hollweg, and the text is now fairly complete. More recently, two sets of papyrus fragments have been found. The discovery of Gaius' work has thrown a flood of light on portions of the history of Roman law which had previously been most obscure. Much of the historical information given by Gaius is wanting in the compilations of Justinian, and, in particular, the account of the ancient forms of procedure in actions. In these forms can be traced "survivals" from the most primitive times, which provide the science of comparative law with valuable illustrations, which may explain the strange forms of legal procedure found in other early systems.

There are several editions of the Institutes, beginning with the editio princeps of I. F. L. Göschen (Berlin, 1820). The author of the 1911 Encyclopædia Britannica article recommends the English edition of Edward Poste published in 1885, which includes an English translation and copious commentary. More recent editions include E. Seckel and B. Kuebler (8th edition; Leipzig, 1939); Francis de Zulueta, containing his own Latin text with an English translation and commentary (1946); and W. M. Gordon and O. F. Robinson (London, 1988), with an English translation and the Latin text by Seckel and Kuebler. A comparison of the early forms of action mentioned by Gaius with those used by other primitive societies will be found in Sir Henry Maine's Early Institutions, chapter 9. For further information see M. Glasson, Étude sur Gaius et sur le jus respondendi.

== Relief ==
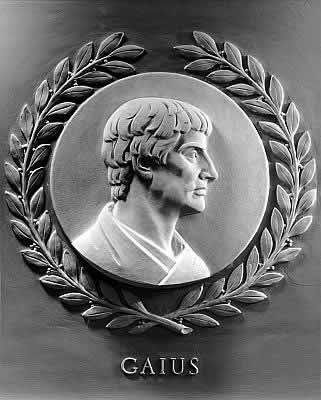
Bas-relief of Gaius from the chamber of the U.S. House of Representatives.

In the 1950s, the Polish-American sculptor Joseph Kiselewski was commissioned to create four marble reliefs located over the gallery doorway at the Chambers of the U.S. House of Representatives in Washington D.C. They are each 28" in diameter. The relief of Gaius is one of the four.

== See also ==
- Law of Citations
- Roman law
- Legal history

== Notes ==
////
