= Demography of the Roman Empire =

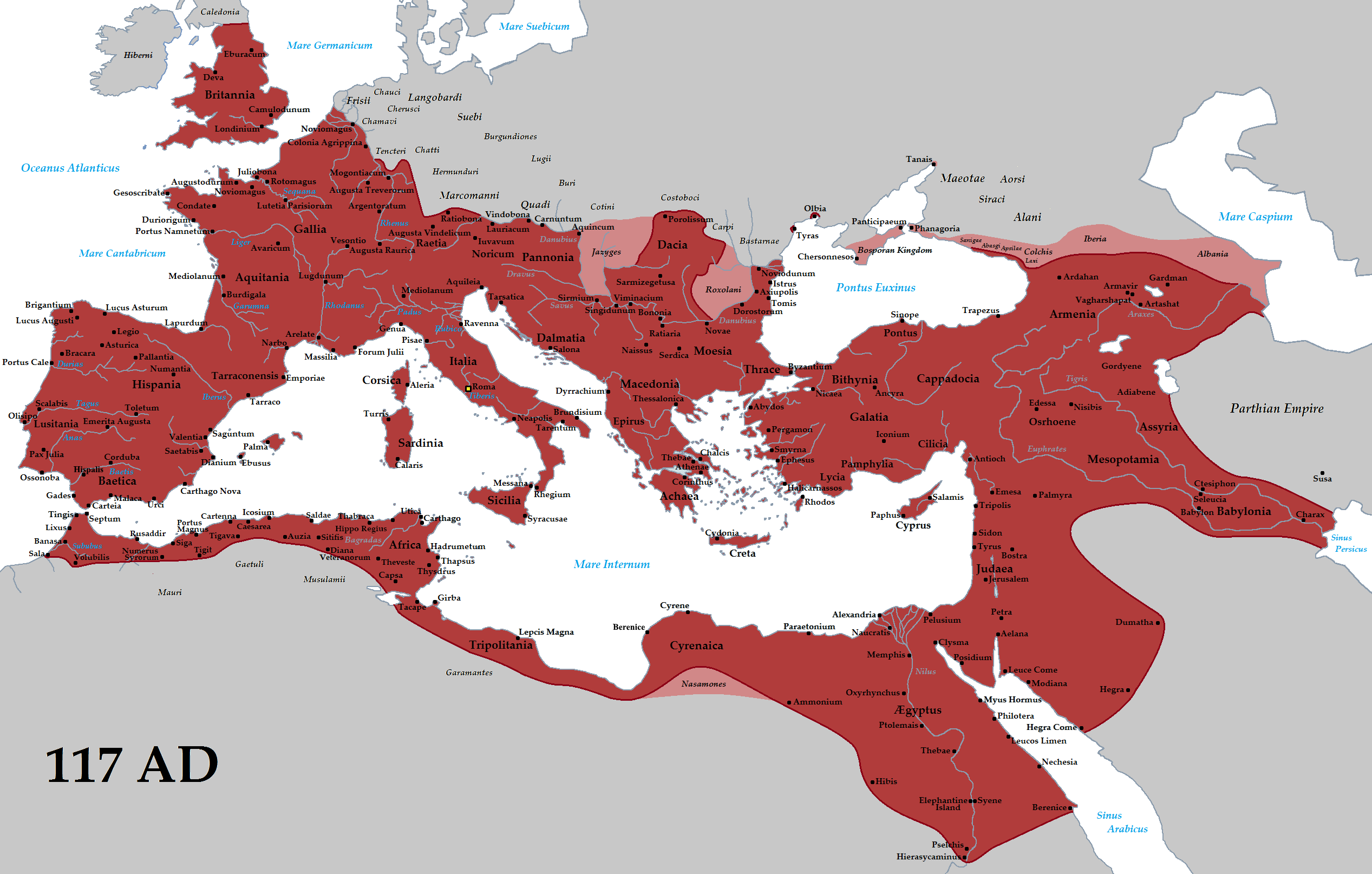
The Roman Empire was at its greatest extent during the reign of Trajan, 117 AD

The Roman Empire's population has been estimated at between 59 and 76 million in the 1st and 2nd centuries, likely peaking just before the Antonine Plague. Historian Kyle Harper provides an estimate of a population of 75 million and an average population density of about 20 people per square kilometer (km^{2}) at its peak, with unusually high urbanization. During the 1st and 2nd centuries CE, the population of the city of Rome is conventionally estimated at 1 million inhabitants. Historian Ian Morris estimates that no other city in Western Eurasia would have as many again until the 19th century.

Papyrus evidence from Roman Egypt suggests that like other, more-recent and thus better-documented pre-modern societies, the Roman Empire experienced high infant mortality, a low marriage age, and high fertility within marriage. Perhaps half of Roman subjects died by the age of 10; of those who survived to that age, half would die by 50.

Due to migration, the ethnic composition of the city of Rome, its vicinity, and Italy as a whole went through substantial changes during the early and later stages of the Empire, with the migration divisible mainly in two separate periods: first during the Principate from Eastern Mediterranean areas; and later, beginning from the Dominate by Northern and Western European peoples, continuing throughout the Middle Ages and the Early Modern period. The resultant changes are reflected in the differences between Northern and Southern Italy to this day. The genetic distance between Northern and Southern Italians, although large for a single European nationality, is similar to that between Northern and Southern Germans.

== Background ==
For the lands around the Mediterranean Sea and their hinterlands, the period from the second millennium BCE to the early first millennium CE was one of substantial population growth. What would become the territory of the Roman Empire saw an average annual population growth of about 0.1% from the 12th century BCE to the 3rd century CE, resulting in a quadrupling of the region's total population. Growth was slower around the eastern Mediterranean, which was already more developed at the beginning of the period, on the order of about 0.07% per year. This was stronger growth than that seen in the succeeding period; from about 200 CE to 1800 CE, the European half of the Empire only saw about 0.06–0.07% annual growth (Europe as a whole saw 0.1% annual growth rates), and the North African and West Asian parts of the Empire saw almost no growth at all.

By comparison, what is now the territory of China experienced 0.1% annual growth from 1 CE to 1800 CE. After a population decline following the disintegration of the western half of the Roman Empire in the 5th and 6th centuries CE, Europe probably re-attained Roman-era population totals in the 12th and 13th centuries. Following another decline associated with the Black Death, it consistently exceeded them after the mid-15th century.

There are no reliable surviving records for the general demography of the Roman Empire, nor are there any detailed local records such as those that underlie the demographic study of Early Modern Europe. Large numbers of impressionistic, moralizing, and anecdotal observations on demography survive from literary sources; they are of little use in the study of Roman demography, which tends to rely instead on conjecture and comparisons rather than records and observations.

== Mortality ==
Life expectancy at birth in the Roman Empire is estimated to have been about 22–33 years. (Note: For the literature about estimates, see Hall & Kotre (1997, pp. 47–49),Wolf (2005, p. 97), Carrieri & Serraino (2005), Hübner & Ratzan (2006, p. 2), Flower (2014, p. 105), Scheidel (2017, p. 29): "25–30", and Ryan (2021, p. 44).) For the two thirds to three quarters of the population surviving the first year of life, life expectancy at age 1 is estimated at around 34–41 remaining years (i.e., expected to live to age 35–42), while for the 55–65% surviving to age 5, life expectancy was around 40–45. The ~50% that reached age 10 could expect to reach ~45–50, and the 46–49% surviving to their mid-teens could on average expect to reach around 48–54, although many lived much longer or shorter lives for varied reasons (e.g., wars for males, childbirth for females). Even if these figures rely more on conjecture than ancient evidence, which is sparse and of dubious quality, the known socioeconomic conditions of the Roman Empire indicate life expectancy toward the usual lower bound of pre-modern populations. Roman demography bears comparison to available data for India and rural China in the early 20th century, where life expectancies at birth were also in the 20s.

About 300 census returns filed in Egypt in the first three centuries CE survive. The classical scholar R.S. Bagnall and the political scientist B.W. Frier used them to build female and male age distributions that show life expectancies at birth of 22–25 years, results broadly consistent with model life tables. Other sources used for population reconstructions include cemetery skeletons, Roman tombstones in North Africa, and an annuities table known as "Ulpian's life table." The basis and interpretation of these sources is disputed: the skeletons cannot be firmly dated, the tombstones show non-representative sample populations, and the sources of "Ulpian's life table" are unknown. Nonetheless, because they converge with low Roman-elite survival rates shown in the literary sources, and because their evidence is consistent with data from populations with comparably high mortality rates (e.g., in 18th-century France and early–20th-century China, India, and Egypt), they reinforce the basic assumption of Roman demography: that life expectancies at birth were in the low 20s.

Because no population for which accurate observations survive had such a low life expectancy, model life tables must be used to understand this population's age demography. These models, based on historical data, describe typical populations at different levels of mortality. For his demographic synopsis of the Roman Empire, Frier used the Model West framework, which he sees as "the most generalized and widely applicable." Because it is based on only one empirical input, the model life table can provide only a very approximate picture of Roman demography. On two important points, the table may seriously misrepresent the Roman situation: the structural relationship between juvenile and adult mortality, and relative mortality rates between men and women. In any case, Roman mortality should be expected to have varied greatly across time, place, and perhaps class. (Note: Frier elsewhere quotes material to the effect that cross-class variation in life expectancy in high mortality societies is small.) A variation of 10 years would not have been unusual. A life expectancy range of 20–30 years is therefore plausible, although it may have been exceeded in either direction in marginal regions (e.g. malarious urban districts on one end and high-altitude, low-density settlements on the other).

Model West, Level 3: A possible life table for the Roman Empire
	Females			Males		
Age	Mortality	Cohort	Life expectancy	Mortality	Cohort	Life expectancy
0	0.3056	100,000	25.0	0.3517	100,000	22.8
1	0.2158	69,444	34.9	0.2147	64,826	34.1
5	0.0606	54,456	40.1	0.0563	50,906	39.0
10	0.0474	51,156	37.5	0.0404	48,041	36.2
15	0.0615	48,732	34.2	0.0547	46,099	32.6
20	0.0766	45,734	31.3	0.0775	43,579	29.4
25	0.0857	42,231	28.7	0.0868	40,201	26.6
30	0.0965	38,614	26.1	0.1002	36,713	23.9
35	0.1054	34,886	23.7	0.1168	33,035	21.3
40	0.1123	31,208	21.1	0.1397	29,177	18.7
45	0.1197	27,705	18.5	0.1597	25,101	16.4
50	0.1529	24,389	15.6	0.1981	21,092	14.0
55	0.1912	20,661	13.0	0.2354	16,915	11.8
60	0.2715	16,712	10.4	0.3091	12,932	9.6
65	0.3484	12,175	8.4	0.3921	8,936	7.7
70	0.4713	7,934	6.5	0.5040	5,432	6.1
75	0.6081	4,194	4.9	0.6495	2,694	4.6
80	0.7349	1,644	3.6	0.7623	944	3.4
85	0.8650	436	2.5	0.8814	225	2.4
90	0.9513	59	1.8	0.9578	27	1.7
95	1.0000	3	1.2	1.0000	1	1.2
After Frier, "Demography", 789, table 1. (Note: Mortality is a function predicting the likelihood that a person aged exactly (x) will die before the next indicated interval; cohort lists the number of survivors to exact age (x).)

The specifics of any ancient age distribution would have seen heavy variation under local conditions. Moreover, the major cause of death in pre-modern societies was not the chronic, end-of-life conditions that characterize mortality in industrialized societies, or primary malnutrition. Instead, it was acute infectious disease, which has varied effects on age distributions in populations. For example, pulmonary tuberculosis characterized much of the Roman region in antiquity; the deaths it caused tend to be concentrated in the early 20s, where model life tables show a mortality trough. Similarly, in pre-modern societies for which evidence is available (e.g., Early Modern England, early–18th-century China), infant mortality varies independently of adult mortality to the extent that equal life expectancies at age 20 can be obtained in societies with infant mortality rates of 15–35%. Life table models, which assume that age-specific mortality ratios co-vary in uniform, predictable ratios, do not account for this fact. No ancient evidence can gauge this effect (the sources have a strong tendency to overlook infant death), and the model life tables might overstate it; comparative evidence suggests that it is very high and that mortality was strongly concentrated in the first years of life.

Mortality on this scale discourages investment in human capital, which hinders productivity growth, creates large numbers of dependent widows and orphans, and hinders long-term economic planning. With the prevalence of debilitating diseases, the number of effective working years was even worse: health-adjusted life expectancy (HALE), the number of years lived in good health, varies from life expectancy by no more than 8% in modern societies. In high-mortality societies, such as Rome, it could be as much as one sixth (17%) beneath total life expectancy. Adolescent mortality rates in Rome were two thirds higher than in early modern Britain. A HALE of less than 20 years would have left the Empire with very depressed levels of economic productivity.

== Fertility ==
To maintain replacement levels under such a mortality regime—much less to achieve sustained growth—fertility figures needed to be very high. With life expectancies of 20–30 years, women would have to give birth to between 4.5 and 6.5 children to maintain replacement levels. Given elevated levels of divorce, widowhood, and sterility, the birth rate would have needed to be higher than that baseline, at around 6–9 children per woman. Fertility could not long have either fallen below or outstripped replacement levels. A population that maintained an annual growth or decline of 0.7% would double or halve itself, respectively, every century. Such rates are feasible locally or over a short period of time, and deaths could consistently outstrip births during epidemics. In the long term, convergence to maintenance levels was the rule.

The surviving census returns from Roman Egypt show a population that had not yet undergone the fertility transition. Artificial fertility controls like contraception and abortion were not widely used to alter natural fecundity in the Roman period. Only family limitation, in which couples ceased procreating after they had attained an acceptable level of children, could have been widespread. There is no indication that even this limitation was widespread, and the recorded distribution shows no evidence of being governed by parity or maternal age.

Marital fertility in Roman Egypt (Annual births per thousand married women)
Age	Roman Egypt		Natural fertility
Age	Attested rates	Gompertz model	Natural fertility
12–14	22	23	225
15–19	232	249	420
20–24	343	333	460
25–29	367	325	431
30–34	293	299	396
35–39	218	262	321
40–44	219	166	167
45–49	134	37	24
After Frier, "Natural fertility," 325, Table 1. (Note: The Gompertz figures are obtained using linear regression on the census figures to create a relational fertility model, producing a probable schedule of true fertility rates. The model uses two values, α and β, that determine the model's relationship to a standard of early marriage and natural fertility. For this dataset, α, which indicates variation from median age of marital maternity, is −0.05, and β, which indicates the degree of fertility concentration, is 0.80. As the standard figure for β is 1.0, the dataset for Roman Egypt shows a wider spread of childbearing than is typical of the standard.)

Imperial Rome largely conforms to what is known as the Mediterranean pattern of marital fertility: men married late, and women married early. The evidence on marriage age is fairly robust for Roman elites: men in the senatorial class were expected to marry in their early 20s, while women were expected to marry in their early teens. According to the most plausible interpretation of the evidence from funerary commemoration among the lower classes, women married in their late teens or early 20s, men in their late 20s or early 30s.

The Roman pattern thus stands in contrast to the Eastern (i.e., East Asian) pattern, in which both men and women married young. China, the major example of the Eastern pattern, also had lower levels of fertility than Rome. This was apparently achieved by a combination of prolonged breastfeeding, selective female infanticide, and male celibacy, although the details are controversial. Roman families shared some features of the Eastern pattern. For example, Roman Egypt had a custom of extended breastfeeding, which may have lengthened birth spacing. Egyptian fertility levels are comparable to those recorded in the early modern Japanese village Nakahara, where about half the population practiced family limitation. On the historian Walter Scheidel's judgment, this speaks to the incidence of family limitation even in what are supposedly natural fertility regimes.

Roman and Greek literary and legal traditions frequently refer to the Eastern demographic features of infanticide and child exposure. Although the extent of these practices is unlikely to have been small, it is nonetheless impossible to quantify, and reported gender ratios do not permit judgment on the prevalence of femicide. These Eastern features did not prevail in medieval or modern Europe, where there were cultural and structural factors directly discouraging them or diminishing their effects on childhood mortality. These included among others religious doctrine, legal enforcement, institutions for foundlings, child labor, and wet-nursing. Such constraints were weak or absent in Greek and Roman society.

== Migration: Rome and Italy ==
=== Genetic studies ===
The Roman Empire under Hadrian (r. 117–138), showing the legions deployed in its senatorial provinces

Genetic studies have indicated that the Iron Age population of Latium was a mixture of the preceding Early European Farmers and Western Hunter-Gatherers, with about 30% Steppe ancestry largely coming from the Pontic–Caspian Steppe. However, two of six individuals from Latin burials from Latium vetus were found to be a mixture of local Iron Age ancestry and an ancient Near Eastern population (best approximated by Bronze Age Armenian or Iron Age Anatolian population). In addition, one of four individuals from Etruscan burials at Veii and Civitavecchia, a female, was found to have a mixture of local Iron Age and North African (best approximated by Late Neolithic Moroccan) ancestry. The Iron Age and early Republican Italic and Etruscan samples overlap with present-day Italians and other west Mediterranean populations.

The results have indicated substantial migration from the Eastern Mediterranean into the city of Rome and the surrounding areas of central Italy during the Principate. Notably, only 2 of 48 Imperial-era individuals fall into the west Mediterranean cluster, to which 8 out of 11 Iron Age individuals belong. Conversely, two thirds of Imperial individuals (31 of 48) overlap with Central and Eastern Mediterranean populations, such as those of Southern and Central Italy, Greece, Cyprus, and Malta. An additional quarter (13 of 48) of the sampled individuals from the Imperial period (27 BC–300 AD) show genetic ties to Levantine and Near Eastern populations, with some of them projecting close to four contemporaneous individuals from Lebanon. (Note: The authors caution about the exact composition of these remains, as changes in burial practices may have amplified the supposed shift in ancestry among individuals from the Imperial age: "By sharp contrast, all analyzed individuals from the Roman Imperial and Late Antique periods (1 to 500 CE) show a marked shift in ancestry toward populations of the eastern Mediterranean. While the strength of this shift might be influenced by the changing frequency of different burial practices—such as cremation and inhumation—among groups through time (43, 44), it clearly depicts the role of the Roman Empire in the large-scale displacement of people in a time of enhanced upward or downward socioeconomic and geographic mobility.") Despite their Eastern Mediterranean origins, isotopic evidence from these individuals (e.g., those buried in the Isola Sacra necropolis near Rome's port) suggests they grew up locally, indicating the successful integration of people from diverse backgrounds into Roman society. Recent ancient DNA studies reveal that this Eastern Mediterranean ancestry was already present in central Italy between the 4th and 2nd centuries BC and may have reached Rome via Southern Italy, where Punic, Phoenician, and Greek (Magna Graecia) networks had been established since the 1st millennium BC.

The results indicate that during Late Antiquity, this Eastern Mediterranean migration subsided and was replaced by the migration of northern European nations. Consequently, the ethnic composition began to take on an increasingly European character, a trend that intensified during the Migration Period and continued even long after the collapse of the Western Roman Empire as the geopolitics of Italy tied it ever more closely to its northern neighbors (e.g. via the Holy Roman Empire). These migratory waves contributed to the present-day north–south genetic gradient along the Italian Peninsula, extending from southwestern to southeastern Europe. Multiple DNA studies have confirmed that all Italians are made up of the same ancestral components, but in different proportions, related to the Mesolithic, Neolithic, Bronze and Iron Age settlements of Europe. The genetic gap between Northern and Southern Italians is filled by an intermediate Central Italian cluster, creating a continuous cline of variation down the peninsula and across the islands (with the Sardinians as outliers in Italy and Europe) that mirrors geography. Overall, the estimated Balkan and Northwestern European paternal contributions in Southern Italy and Sicily are about 63% and 26%, respectively.

=== Sepulchary inscriptions ===
In 1916, Tenney Frank published an analysis of the names in inscriptions on graves and tombs and in columbaria holding cremated remains. He reported that while foreign migration was greatest into the city of Rome itself, the native populations may have been reduced to a minority throughout all of Italy. Additionally, he suggested that this migration was primarily based on slave importation, not free immigrants, and that due to large numbers of enslaved people being freed and their fertility rates being higher than those of high–socioeconomic-class citizens, slaves and their descendants came to comprise many or most of the population. He asserted that "what lay behind and constantly reacted upon [the] causes of Rome's disintegration was, after all, to a considerable extent, the fact that the people who built Rome had given way to a different race".

=== Contemporary accounts and attitude ===
There are not many contemporary statements about migration into Italy and Rome. Of those that have survived, most are either cautiously worded or negative towards the inflow of foreigners and may indicate the wide extent to which it occurred. For example, the historian Suetonius records two notable cases in which policies had been undertaken to assuage tensions arising from the mass importation of enslaved people. In the first case, the dictator for life Julius Caesar had decreed that at least one third of the workforce employed in herding be freeborn, not enslaved, herding being one of the main labors in Italy. In the second case, the first emperor Octavian Augustus went further and sought to limit the granting of freedom and citizenship to slaves altogether. (Note: Suetonius wrote: He was chary of conferring Roman citizenship, thinking it vital to keep the race pure and untainted by foreign or slave blood, and to the latter end setting a limit to manumission. ... thereby making it difficult for slaves to win their freedom, let alone rights of citizenship, he also decreed that no slave who had ever been in irons or subject to torture could acquire citizenship, regardless of the manner of his freedom.) This tension between the native population and the inflow of foreigners over the duration of the Empire is also reflected in a private letter from Seneca the Younger to his mother. (Note: Seneca wrote: Of this crowd the greater part have no country; from their own free towns and colonies, in a word, from the whole globe, they are congregated. Some are brought by ambition, some by the call of public duty, or by reason of some mission, others by luxury which seeks a harbor rich and commodious for vices, others by the eager pursuit of liberal studies, others by shows, etc.)

In his Satires, the satirist and poet Juvenal repeatedly laments the inflow of foreign Greeks into Rome and of the encroachment of their traditions upon Roman ones. (Note: Two quotes from Satires III exemplify this. The first says:... while every land, Sicyon, and Amydos, and Alaband, Tralles, and Samos, and a thousand more, Thrive on his indolence, and daily pour Their starving myriads forth: hither they come, And batten on the genial soil of Rome. The second reads: That race most acceptable now to our wealthy Romans, That race I principally wish to flee, I'll swiftly reveal, And without embarrassment. My friends, I can't stand A Rome full of Greeks, yet few of the dregs are Greek! For the Syrian Orontes has long since polluted the Tiber, Bringing its language and customs, pipes and harp-strings, And even their native timbrels are dragged along too, And the girls forced to offer themselves in the Circus.) While the satirical character of the writing necessitates caution, the fifth line—referring to the Orontes river around Antioch in Syria—has been proposed to refer to the Hellenistic Greek origin of most imported slaves. Some contemporary statements shed light on the wide extent of foreigners in ancient Rome, especially as enslaved people. For example, the prevalence of freedmen (ex-slaves) is commented on by the historian Tacitus, who wrote: "If freedmen were to be a separate class, the paucity of the freeborn would be conspicuously apparent." In a similar vein, in a speech to voters in Rome, Scipio Aemilianus reminded them of how he had brought many of them to Rome as prisoners, indicating the extent to which one-time war captives from Africa or Spain may have comprised the commoner population at the time (right after the Third Punic War). In contrast to the above statements, a speech by the emperor Claudius, called the Lyon speech (after the location where the tablet originated), offers a more positive attitude towards provincials foreign to Italy: he successfully urges senators to accept rich Gauls from Lugdunum into the Roman Senate by praising their loyalty and devotion to Rome.

=== Italic emigration into provinces ===
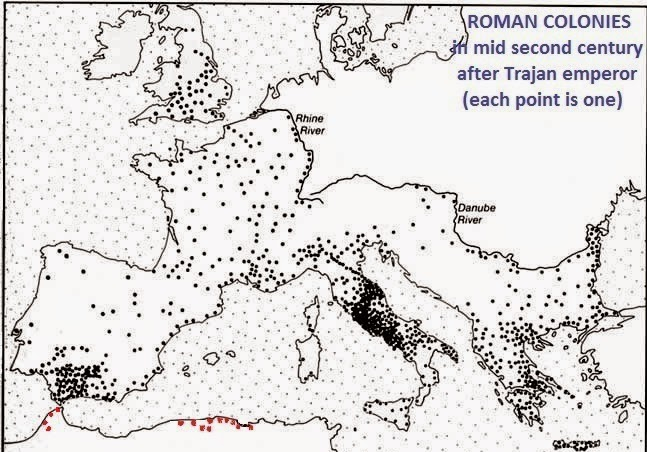
Roman colonies as of the mid-2nd century AD. Augustus' "Roman coloniae" in north Africa are depicted in red.

The successful dedication and expansion of new settlements required significant local migration from village to village, which the geography of the Mediterranean made fairly convenient. Considerable migration was also needed to establish colonies outside of Italy; at the beginning of the Empire, about 750,000 Italians lived in the provinces. Julius Caesar, Mark Antony, and Augustus settled many of their veterans in colonies and the provinces as well as within Italy. In his account of the achievements of his long reign (Res Gestae), Augustus stated that he had settled 120,000 soldiers in 20 colonies within Italy in 31 BCE, then 100,000 men in colonies in Spain and southern Gaul in 14 BCE, followed by another 96,000 in 2 BCE. Historian Brian Campbell also states that "[f]rom 49 to 32 BCE about 420,000 Italians were recruited"; these would thus be the veteran (citizen) stock that was largely sent to the provinces (colonies) during Augustus's reign. The Lex Calpurnia also allowed citizenship to be granted for distinguished bravery, such as with the 1,000 Socii from Camerinum after the Battle of Vercellae in 101 BCE (Plutarch Mar. XXXVIII) or the auxiliary (later Legio XXII Deiotariana) after the Battle of Zela. By the time of Augustus, the legions consisted mostly of ethnic Latins/Italics and Cisalpine Gauls. Historian Theodore Mommsen estimated that under Hadrian, nearly one third of the eastern Numidian (roughly modern Tunisia) population was descended from Roman veterans.

=== Other parts of the Roman Empire ===
In the view of historian Christer Bruun, forced migration via the slave trade likely represented the primary mode of migration within the Roman Empire. This phenomenon is best exemplified by the mass enslavement and displacement of Jews from Judaea following the Jewish–Roman wars (66–135 CE). Jewish historian Josephus reported that the Great Jewish Revolt (66–70 CE) alone resulted in the enslavement of 97,000 people. According to historian Seth Schwartz, this figure indicates that a significant portion of the population was either expelled from Judaea or, at the very least, displaced. What appears to have been a unique instance of oversupply in the Roman market for slaves occurred after the last major Jewish uprising, the Bar Kokhba revolt (132–136 CE), was quashed, when an estimated 100,000 additional people were enslaved.

Another phenomenon of migration in the Roman world was the settlement of military veterans; rather than returning to their lands of origin, many resettled in the vicinity of their point of service, where they established families and raised children. The Roman authorities also created veteran colonies in places such as northern Italy. Under Augustus, two such colonies were constructed in northern Italy: Augusta Praetoria and Augusta Taurinorum. This practice continued throughout the Principate. Under Claudius, veteran colonies were established in Britannia and Mauretania. Following the Great Jewish Revolt, Vespasian is known to have settled 800 veterans in Motza, near Jerusalem. The Flavians and Trajan both settled veterans along the Danube, with the latter also establishing veteran settlements in Dacia.

There is also evidence for the relocation of traders to port cities across the Mediterranean. Examples include the presence of tradesmen from Narbo, in Gaul, at various Sicilian cities; an Italian presence in the Greek island of Delos and the Numidian city of Cirta; and Tyrians who settled in Rome and Puteoli. These Tyrians maintained close relations with their home city in Phoenicia, even petitioning Tyre's council for financial support. Puteoli also hosted a Nabataean population, as indicated by the existence of a Nabataean sanctuary for Dushara, the only Nabataean temple known to exist outside of Arabia Petraea.

Religious persecution was another significant driver, as seen during the persecution of Christians and in the emigration of Jews following the Bar Kokhba revolt in Judaea. Finally, migration was undertaken by individuals in search of employment, personal change, or adventure.

== Population ==
Modern estimates of the population of the Roman Empire started with the fundamental work of 19th-century historian Karl Julius Beloch. His estimates of the areas of different regions of the Empire, based on planimetric estimates by contemporary military cartographers, have not been challenged by any more-recent analyst. By providing a check to population densities, these area figures compel a baseline level of plausibility. Beloch's 1886 estimate of the empire's population in 14 CE has withstood contemporary and 21st-century criticism and underlies modern analysis (his 1899 revision of those figures is less esteemed). Only Beloch's estimates for Anatolia and Greater Syria required extensive revision: his estimated population figure, 19 million, suggested population densities not otherwise achieved in those areas until the 20th century.

In a 2000 estimate of the population of the empire, Frier suggested a figure of 12 million as "considerably more plausible." Beloch's figures for Spain and Africa have also been revised downwards. In a 2017 publication, historian Kyle Harper suggests 75 million for the empire as a whole with 16 million for Anatolia and Greater Syria. This estimate produces a population density of about 20 inhabitants per square kilometer, which is a low figure by modern standards (for example, among countries and dependencies by population density, the United Kingdom has a density of well over 200/km^{2}). The population density in the Greek East was 24/km^{2}, denser than the Latin West at 17/km^{2}; only the Western provinces of Italy and Sicily had a density higher than the average of the East.

Estimate of the population of the Roman Empire
Region	Area (1,000 km^{2})	Mid-2nd century CE population (millions)	Mid-2nd century CE density (per km^{2})
Greek peninsula (Note: This roughly includes the southern Balkan Peninsula (Greece, Albania, North Macedonia, and Serbia), or approximately the Roman provinces of Achaea, Macedonia, and Epirus.)	160	3	19
Anatolia	670	10	15
Greater Syria (Note: It is defined to include the modern territories of Lebanon, Israel, and Palestine, as well as approximately the western half of Syria (i.e. the coastal Levant).)	140	6	43
Egypt (Note: The area figure is only the narrow strip of land along the Nile and its delta, not the vast deserts of Egypt.)	30	5	167
Greek East	1,000	24	24.0
Britain	160	2	13
Italy (w/islands)	310	14	45
North Africa	420	8	19
Iberia	590	9	15
Gaul and Germany	680	12	18
Danube Region (Note: It refers to areas generally south of the river Danube. This includes the Roman provinces of Raetia, Noricum, Pannonia Superior, Pannonia Inferior, Illyricum (or Dalmatia), and Moesia (Superior and Inferior), as well as parts of modern Switzerland, southern Germany and Austria, western Hungary, Slovenia, Croatia, Bosnia, Montenegro, central Serbia, and northern Bulgaria.)	670	6	9
Latin West	2,830	49	17.3
Roman Empire	3,830	75	19.6
"Area" includes the client kingdoms taken over soon after 14 CE. After Harper (2017), page 31, table 2.1.

Harper estimates the population at the time of Augustus at 60 million, one ninth more than Beloch's 1886 estimate, and suggests a population growth rate of 0.1% per year, reaching 75 million after nearly two centuries of growth. Early 21st-century estimates suggest that enslaved people constituted about 15% of the Empire's total population; the proportionate figure would be much higher in Italy and much lower in Africa and Egypt. Frier's estimate produces a population density of 13.6 inhabitants/km^{2}. The population density in the Greek East was 20.9/km^{2}, twice as dense as the Latin West at 10.6/km^{2}; only the Western provinces of Italy and Sicily had a density comparable to the East.

Estimate of the Roman Empire's population
Region	Area (1,000 km^{2})	14 CE population (millions)	14 CE density (per km^{2})	164 CE population (millions)	164 CE density (per km^{2})	Population increase (percent)
Greek peninsula (Note: This roughly includes the southern Balkan peninsula (Greece, Albania, North Macedonia, Serbia, about half of Bulgaria, and European Turkey), or approximately the Roman provinces of Achaea, Macedonia, Epirus, and Thracia.)	267	2.8	10.5	3.0	11.2	7.1
Anatolia	547	8.2	15.0	9.2	16.8	12.2
Greater Syria	109	4.3	39.4	4.8	44.0	11.6
Cyprus	9.5	0.2	21.2	0.2	21.1	–
Egypt (Note: The area figure is only the narrow strip of land along the Nile and its delta, not the vast deserts of Egypt.)	28	4.5	160.7	5.0	178.6	11.1
Libya (Note: It refers only to the coastal area of Cyrenaica.)	15	0.4	26.7	0.6	40.0	50.0
Greek East	975.5	20.4	20.9	22.9	23.5	12.3
Annexations				0.2		
Greek East (with annexations)				23.1		
Italy	250	7.0	28.0	7.6	30.4	8.6
Sicily	26	0.6	23.1	0.6	23.1	–
Sardinia and Corsica	33	0.5	15.2	0.5	15.2	–
Maghreb (Note: It refers to the coastal area of North Africa, i.e. Northern areas of Morocco, Algeria, Tunisia, and most of coastal Libya (except Cyrenaica).)	400	3.5	8.8	6.5	16.3	85.7
Iberia	590	5.0	8.5	7.5	12.7	50.0
Gaul and Germany	635	5.8	9.1	9.0	14.2	55.2
Danube Region	430	2.7	6.3	4.0	9.3	48.1
Latin West	2,364	25.1	10.6	35.7	15.1	42.2
Annexations				2.5		
Latin West (with annexations)				38.2		
Roman Empire	3,339.5	45.5	13.6	61.4	15.9	34.9
"Area" includes the client kingdoms taken over soon after 14 CE. After Frier, "Demography", 812, table 5, 814, table 6.

Estimated distribution of citizenship in the Roman Empire
Region	Citizens (percent)	Noncitizen residents (percent)	Slaves (percent)
Rome	55	15	30
Italy	70	5	25
Spain and Gaul	10	70	20
Other Western provinces	3	80	17
Greece and Asia Minor	3	70	27
North African provinces	2	70	28
Other Eastern provinces	1	80	19

There are few recorded population numbers for the whole of antiquity, and those that exist are often rhetorical or symbolic. Unlike modern nations, Roman citizenship was not granted automatically to inhabitants of Roman territory outside of the city of Rome and its hinterlands. By the 1st century BCE, citizenship was extended to the whole of the Italian peninsula, a region that only constituted 5% of the territory of the Roman Empire. In addition, Roman censuses only measured their adult citizen population, and it is unclear if and when women were counted as citizens as well. Most surviving Roman census return figures date from the late period of the Roman Republic and the Early Empire. Serial statistics for Roman citizen numbers, taken from census returns, survive for the early Republic through the 1st century CE. Only the figures for periods after the mid-3rd century BCE are reliable. Fourteen figures are available for the 2nd century BCE (from 258,318 to 394,736). Only four figures are available for the 1st century BCE, and exhibit a large break between 70/69 BCE (910,000) and 28 BCE (4,063,000). The interpretation of the later figures—the Augustan censuses of 28 BCE, 8 BCE, and 14 CE—is therefore controversial. Alternate interpretations of the Augustan censuses, such as those of historian Elio Lo Cascio, produce divergent population histories across the whole imperial period.

Population of Italy and the islands in 165 CE
	Population (millions)	Area (1,000 km^{2})	Density (per km^{2})
Standard interpretation of the Augustan censuses	8–9	310	26–29
Revised interpretation of the Augustan censuses	12–13	310	39–42
After Scheidel, "Demography", p. 47, n. 42, 47.

The enfranchisement of the Cisalpine provinces and the Italian Allies after the Social War would account for some of the population growth of the 1st century BCE. Alternate readings of the Augustan census both accept the basic accuracy of the figures but assume different methods on the part of the census takers. The standard interpretation assumes that the census takers included all citizens—men, women, and children—in the Augustan censuses, while the revised interpretation assumes they counted adult men only, as they had during the Republican period. While the standard interpretation is not supported by any evidence internal to the text, it reduces the implied population totals for Italy in 28 BCE from 10 million to a more plausible 4 million. The high total earns support from recorded conflict over land in the late Republic and other indications of population pressure. Nonetheless, it does not accord well with comparative evidence from other periods and other parts of the Empire.

=== Earlier estimates ===
Beloch's 1886 estimate for the population of the Empire during the reign of Augustus was as follows:

Region	Population (in millions)
Total Empire	54
European part	23
Asian part	19.5
North African part	11.5

The historian J.C. Russell's 1958 estimate for the population of the Empire in 350 CE was as follows:

Region	Population (in millions)
Total Empire	39.3
European part	18.3
Asian part	16
North African part	5

Demographic studies have argued for a population peak ranging from 70 million (comparable to the contemporaneous and similarly sized Han Empire in China), with one tenth located in Italy itself, to more than 100 million.

== Urbanization ==
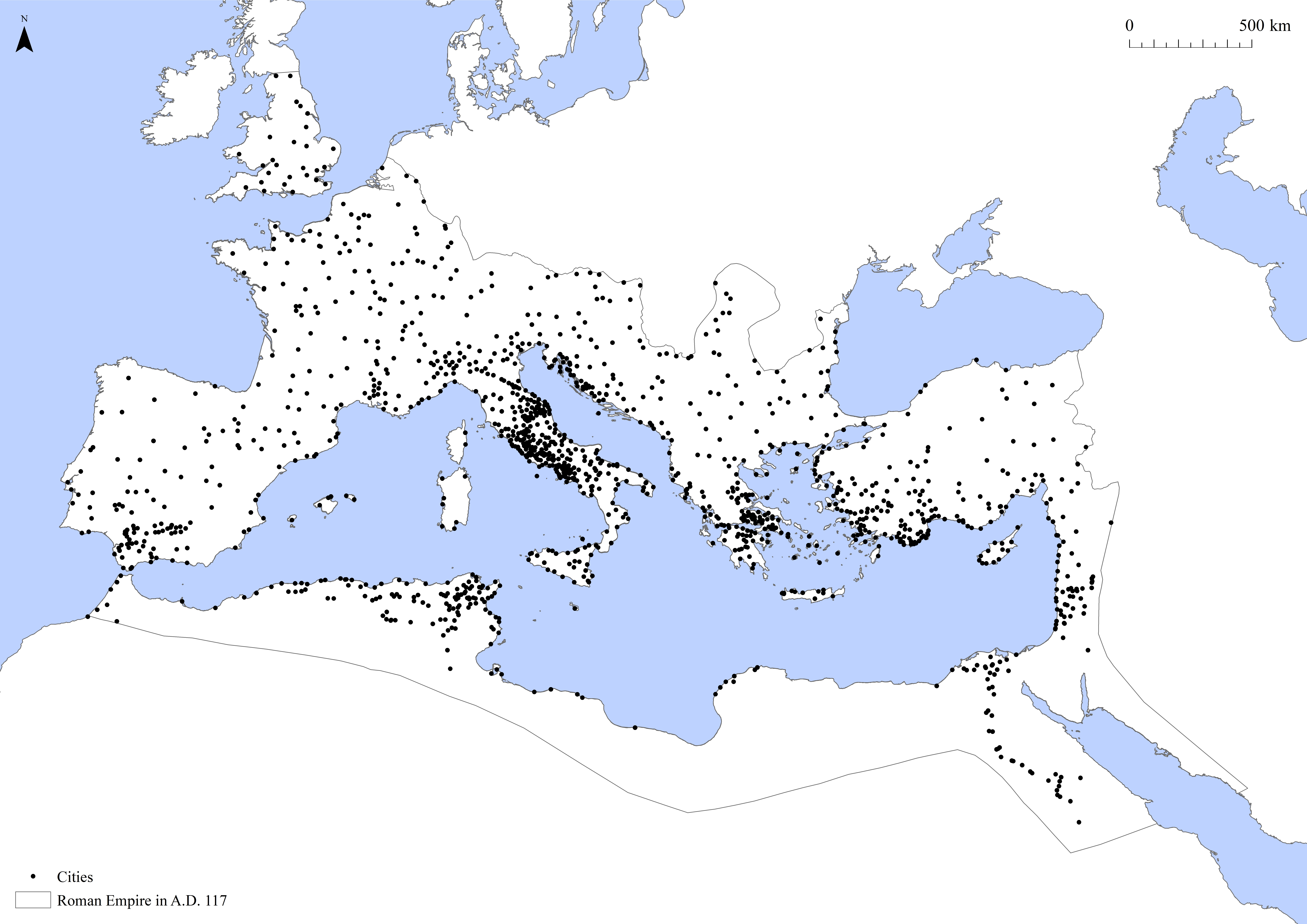
The cities of the Roman world in the Imperial period. Data source: Hanson, J. W. (2016). "Cities Database". OXREP databases. Version 1.0.

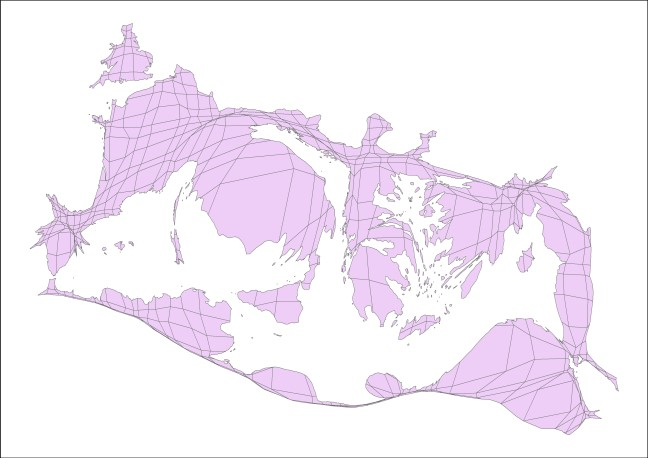
Cartogram of the estimated populations of cities in the Roman world in the Imperial period (after Hanson 2016 and Hanson and Ortman 2017).

By the standards of pre-modern economies, the Roman Empire was highly urbanized. As of 2016, 1,388 urban sites had been identified in the Roman world dating from the late Republican and early Imperial periods. At its peak, the city of Rome is widely thought to have contained at least a million inhabitants, a total not equaled again in Europe until the 19th century. As the imperial capital, Rome was sustained by transfers in kind from throughout the Empire; no other city could be sustained at this level. The other major cities in the Empire, such as Alexandria, Antioch, Carthage, Ephesus, and Salona, had populations exceeding 100,000, with Alexandria's population estimated at 500,000.

Most of these 1,388 cities were small, usually around 5,000 inhabitants. Of the 885 cities whose built-up area has been estimated, 405 (slightly less than half) have areas that suggest a population larger than 5,000, and approximately 8% (69 out of 885) of the sites have areas suggesting a population larger than 30,000. Extrapolation from a sample of 52 excavated sites suggests an imperial urban population of 14 million in around 600 cities with over 5,000 inhabitants, a quarter or a fifth of modern estimates of the Empire's total population, a higher proportion than in Europe at the turn of the 19th century.

High mortality rates and pre-modern sanitary conditions made urban regions net population sinks, with more local deaths than births. They could be sustained only by constant immigration. The large cities provided a major stimulus to demand, not only for agricultural products but for manufactured goods and luxury items as well.

=== Earlier estimates ===
In 1958, Russell produced estimates for the urban population in Late Antiquity. These estimates, which are much lower than 21st-century estimates that refer to the Early Imperial period, are as follows:

City	Population (thousands)	Region
Rome	350	Italy
Alexandria	216	Egypt
Antioch	90	Syria
Smyrna	90	Asia Minor
Gades	65	Hispania
Salona	60	Dalmatia
Ephesus	51	Asia Minor
Carthage	50	Africa
Corinth	50	Greece
Gerasa	40	Jordan
Apamea	37	Syria
Capua	36	Italy
Ancyra	34	Asia Minor
Nicomedia	34	Asia Minor
Oxyrhynchus	34	Egypt
Memphis	34	Egypt
Damascus	31	Syria
Bostra	30	Syria
Athens	28	Greece
Tarraco	27	Hispania
Cyzicus	24	Asia Minor
Hermopolis	24	Egypt
Pergamum	24	Asia Minor
Mytilene	23	Asia Minor
Arsinoe	20	Egypt
Córdoba	20	Hispania
Cirta	20	Africa
Hadrumetum	20	Africa
Pisa	20	Italy
Rusicade	20	Africa
Tyre	20	Syria
Catania	18	Italy
Nicaea	18	Asia Minor
Antioch	17	Asia Minor
Antinoe	16	Egypt
Sicca V.	16	Africa
Mérida	15	Hispania
Miletus	15	Asia Minor
Neapolis	15	Italy
Heliopolis	14	Egypt
Heliopolis in Syria	13.5	Syria
Thugga	13	Africa
Isaura	12	Asia Minor
Sidon	12	Syria
Bononia	10	Italy
Cartagena	10	Hispania
Hippo Regius	10	Africa
Jerusalem	10	Syria
Lambaesis	10	Africa
Pompaelo	10	Hispania
Thysdrus	10	Africa
Trebizond	10	Asia Minor

== See also ==
- Classical demography
- Demographic history

== Sources ==
=== Ancient sources ===
- Annales
  - The Annals. Loeb Classical Library. Vol. 1–4. Translated by Jackson, John. Cambridge: Harvard University Press. 1931–1937 – via University of Chicago's LacusCurtius. For relevant passages, see Tacitus. "Book 13, chapter 27". Annals – via Tufts University's Perseus Digital Library.
- Digest
  - The Civil Law. Vol. 1–17. Translated by Scott, Samuel Parsons Scott. Cincinnati: Central Trust Company. 1932 – via Constitution Society. See in particular the Digest (Pandects) III–L volumes.
- Lyon Tablet
  - The Tabula Lugdunensis: A Critical Edition with Translation and Commentary. Translated by Malloch, Simon. 2020. pp. 51–61. For the Lyon speech, see "Claudius: Lyon Speech" – via University of Arkansas's The Bibliotheke.
- Res Gestae Divi Augusti
  - Compendium of Roman History. Res Gestae Divi Augusti. Loeb Classical Library. Translated by Shipley, Frederick W. Cambridge: Harvard University Press. 1924 – via University of Chicago's LacusCurtius.
- Satires
  - Juvenal. "Satires III:58-125 And What About all Those Greeks?". Satires – via VRoma. Juvenal. Satire. lines 66–85 – via Poetry In Translation.
- The Twelve Caesars
  - Suetonius. The Twelve Caesars. Book I: Julius Caesar, XLII Other Reforms – via Poetry In Translation.

=== Modern sources ===
- Abun-Nasr, Jamil M. (1977). A History of the Maghrib. Cambridge: Cambridge University Press.
- Aikens, Rachael C.; Aneli, Serena; Antonio, Margaret L.; Bartoli, Fulvio; Bedini, Alessandro; Calderon, Diego; Candilio, Francesca; Cheronet, Olivia; Cotter, Daniel J.; Devitofranceschi, Katharina; Gao, Ziyue; Lucci, Michaela; Moots, Hannah M.; Oberreiter, Victoria; Sawyer, Susanna (8 November 2019). "Ancient Rome: A Genetic Crossroads of Europe and the Mediterranean". Science. 366 (6466). New York: 708–714. Bibcode:2019Sci...366..708A. doi:10.1126/science.aay6826. ISSN 0036-8075. PMC 7093155. PMID 31699931.
- Alessandri, Luca; Arienzo, Ilenia; Carrara, Nicola; D'Atanasio, Eugenia; De Angelis, Flavio; Hui, Ruoyun; Kivisild, Toomas; Larson, Greger; Lebrasseur, Ophélie; Montinaro, Francesco; Rolfo, Mario Federico; Saupe, Tina; Scaggion, Cinzia; Skeates, Robin; Solnik, Anu (June 2021). "Ancient Genomes Reveal Structural Shifts after the Arrival of Steppe-Related Ancestry in the Italian Peninsula". Current Biology. 31 (12): 2576–2591.e12. Bibcode:2021CBio...31E2576S. doi:10.1016/j.cub.2021.04.022. hdl:11585/827581. ISSN 0960-9822. PMID 33974848.
- Alù, Milena; Boattini, Alessio; Carta, Marilisa; Ciani, Graziella; Ferri, Gianmarco; Luiselli, Donata; Pettener, Davide; Sarno, Stefania; Yao, Daniele Yang (30 April 2014). "An Ancient Mediterranean Melting Pot: Investigating the Uniparental Genetic Structure and Population History of Sicily and Southern Italy". PLOS ONE. 9 (4) e96074. Bibcode:2014PLoSO...996074S. doi:10.1371/journal.pone.0096074. ISSN 1932-6203. PMC 4005757. PMID 24788788. This article contains quotations from this source, which is available under a Creative Commons Attribution 4.0 International (CC BY 4.0) license.
- Balaščák, Ivan; Esko, Tõnu; Galan, Pilar; Karachanak, Sena; Heath, Simon; Jakkula, Eveliina; Lathrop, Mark; Mägi, Reedik; Nelis, Mari; Peltonen, Leena; Piskáčková, Tereza; Rehnström, Karola; Toncheva, Draga; Zimprich, Alexander; Zimprich, Fritz (8 May 2009). "Genetic Structure of Europeans: A View from the North–East". PLOS ONE. 4 (5) e5472. Bibcode:2009PLoSO...4.5472N. doi:10.1371/journal.pone.0005472. ISSN 1932-6203. PMC 2675054. PMID 19424496.
- Bruun, Christer (2016). "Tracing Familial Mobility: Female and Child Migrants in the Roman West". Migration and Mobility in the Early Roman Empire. Studies in Global Migration History. Vol. 23. Brill. p. 186. ISBN 978-90-04-30737-7.
- Isaac, Benjamin (1990). The Limits of Empire: The Roman Army in the East. Oxford University Press. ISBN 978-0-198-14952-1.
- Noy, David (2002). Foreigners at Rome: citizens and strangers (Reprinted ed.). London: Duckworth [u.a.] ISBN 978-0-7156-2952-9.
- Allen, Robert C. (June 2009). "How Prosperous were the Romans? Evidence from Diocletian's Price Edict (AD 301)". In Bowman, Alan; Wilsonm, Andrew (eds.). Quantifying the Roman Economy. Oxford: Oxford University Press. pp. 327–345. doi:10.1093/acprof:oso/9780199562596.003.0016. ISBN 978-0-1995-6259-6. Originally a Discussion Paper Series No. 363 published in October 2007 from the University of Oxford, Department of Economics.
- Aneli, S.; Angius, A.; Athanasiadis, G.; Barlera, S.; Birolo, G.; Boncoraglio, G.; Di Blasio, A. M.; Di Gaetano, C.; Montinaro, F.; Pagani, L.; Parolo, S.; Paschou, P.; Piazza, A.; Raveane, A.; Stamatoyannopoulos, G. (September 2019). "Population Structure of Modern-Day Italians Reveals Patterns of Ancient and Archaic Ancestries in Southern Europe". Science Advances. 5 (9) eaaw3492. Bibcode:2019SciA....5.3492R. doi:10.1126/sciadv.aaw3492. ISSN 2375-2548. PMC 6726452. PMID 31517044.
- Busby, G.B.J.; Hellenthal, G.; Montinaro, F.; Tofanelli, S.; Bulayeva, K.; Rudan, I.; Zemunik, T.; Hayward, C.; Toncheva, D.; Karachanak-Yankova, S.; Nesheva, D.; Anagnostou, P.; Cali, F.; Brisighelli, F.; Romano, V.; Lefranc, G.; Buresi, C.; Ben Chibani, J.; Haj-Khelil, A.; Denden, S.; Ploski, R.; Krajewski, P.; Hervig, T.; Moen, T.; Herrera, R.J.; Wilson, J.F.; Myers, S.; Capelli, C. (2015). "The Role of Recent Admixture in Forming the Contemporary West Eurasian Genomic Landscape". Current Biology. 25 (19): 2518–2526. Bibcode:2015CBio...25.2518B. doi:10.1016/j.cub.2015.08.007. PMC 4714572. PMID 26387712.
- Raveane A, Aneli S, Montinaro F, Athanasiadis G, Barlera S, Birolo G, Boncoraglio G, Di Blasio AM, Di Gaetano C, Pagani L, Parolo S, Paschou P, Piazza A, Stamatoyannopoulos G, Angius A, Brucato N, Cucca F, Hellenthal G, Mulas A, Peyret-Guzzon M, Zoledziewska M, Baali A, Bycroft C, Cherkaoui M, Chiaroni J, Di Cristofaro J, Dina C, Dugoujon JM, Galan P, Giemza J, Kivisild T, Mazieres S, Melhaoui M, Metspalu M, Myers S, Pereira L, Ricaut FX, Brisighelli F, Cardinali T, Grugni V, Lancioni H, Pascali VL, Torroni A, Semino D, Matullo G, Achilli A, Olivieri A, Capelli C (2019). "Population Structure of Modern-Day Italians Reveals Patterns of Ancient and Archaic Ancestries in Southern Europe". Science Advances. 5 (9) eaaw3492. Bibcode:2019SciA....5.3492R. doi:10.1126/sciadv.aaw3492. ISSN 2375-2548. PMC 6726452. PMID 31517044.
- Beloch, Karl Julius (1886). Die Bevölkerung der griechisch-römischen Welt (in German). Berlin: Duncker & Humblot.
- Boatwright, Mary T. (2021). Imperial Women of Rome: Power, Gender, Context. Oxford: Oxford University Press. ISBN 978-0-1904-5589-7 – via Google Books.
- Campbell, Brian (1994). The Roman Army, 31 BC–AD 337. Oxford: Clarendon Press.
- Carrieri, Maria Patrizia; Serraino, Diego (1 December 2005). "Longevity of Popes and Artists between the 13th and the 19th Century". International Journal of Epidemiology. 34 (6): 1435–1436. doi:10.1093/ije/dyi211. PMID 16260451.
- Frank, Tenney (1916). "Race Mixture in the Roman Empire". The American Historical Review. 21 (4): 689–708. doi:10.2307/1835889. JSTOR 1835889. For relevant passages, see
- Frank, Tenney (1923). "The Causes of Rome's Decline". A History of Rome. New York: Henry Holt and Company – via University of Chicago's LacusCurtius.
- Friedman, Jonathan (1998). "Transnationalization, Socio-Political Disorder, and Ethnification as Expressions of Declining Global Hegemony". International Political Science Review. 19 (3): 233–259. doi:10.1177/019251298019003003. JSTOR 1601493. S2CID 145343003. See in particular p. 248.
- Frier, Bruce W. (1982). "Roman Life Expectancy: Ulpian's Evidence". Harvard Studies in Classical Philology. 86 (36): 213–251. doi:10.2307/311195. JSTOR 311195. PMID 16437859.
- Frier, Bruce W. (1994). "Natural Fertility and Family Limitation in Roman Marriage". Classical Philology. 89 (4): 318–333. doi:10.1086/367430. PMID 16435460. S2CID 7839595.
- Frier, Bruce W. (2000). "Demography". In Bowman, Alan K.; Garnsey, Peter; Rathbone, Dominic (eds.). The Cambridge Ancient History XI: The High Empire, A.D. 70–192. Cambridge: Cambridge University Press. pp. 827–854.
- Friesen, Steven J.; Scheidel, Walter (2009). "The Size of the Economy and the Distribution of Income in the Roman Empire". Journal of Roman Studies. 99: 61–91. doi:10.3815/007543509789745223. S2CID 202968244.
- Goldhill, Simon (2006). Being Greek Under Rome: Cultural Identity, the Second Sophistic and the Development of Empire. Cambridge: Cambridge University Press.
- Hall, Elizabeth; Kotre, John N. (1997). Seasons of Life: The Dramatic Journey from Birth to Death. Ann Arbor: University of Michigan Press. ISBN 978-0-4720-8512-5 – via Google Books.
- Hanson, J. W. (2016). An Urban Geography of the Roman World, 100 BC to AD 300. Oxford: Archaeopress. ISBN 978-1-7849-1472-1.
- Hanson, J. W.; Ortman, S. G. (2017). "A Systematic Method for Estimating the Populations of Greek and Roman Settlements". Journal of Roman Archaeology. 30: 301–324. doi:10.1017/S1047759400074134. S2CID 165770409.
- Harper, Kyle (2017). The Fate of Rome. Princeton: Princeton University Press.
- Harris, William V. (1980). "Towards a Study of the Roman Slave Trade". Memoirs of the American Academy in Rome. 36: 122. doi:10.2307/4238700. ISSN 0065-6801. JSTOR 4238700.
- Hopkins, Keith (1966). "On the Probable Age Structure of the Roman Population". Population Studies. 20 (2): 245–264. doi:10.2307/2172985. JSTOR 2172985. PMID 22084913.
- Hübner, Sabine R.; Ratzan, David M., eds. (2006). Growing Up Fatherless in Antiquity (PDF). Cambridge: Cambridge University Press. doi:10.1017/CBO9780511575594. ISBN 978-0-5214-9050-4 – via Princeton University.
- Flower, Harriet I. (2014). The Cambridge Companion to the Roman Republic. Cambridge: Cambridge University Press. ISBN 978-1-1399-9238-1 – via Google Books.
- Kehoe, Dennis P. (2007). "The Early Roman Empire: Production". In Morris, Ian; Saller, Richard P.; Scheidel, Walter (eds.). The Cambridge Economic History of the Greco-Roman World. Cambridge: Cambridge University Press. pp. 543–569.
- Lo Cascio, Elio (1994). "The Size of the Roman Population: Beloch and the Meaning of the Augustan Census Figures". Journal of Roman Studies. 84: 23–40. doi:10.2307/300868. JSTOR 300868. S2CID 161237859.
- Lo Cascio, Elio (2007). "The Early Roman Empire: The State and the Economy". In Morris, Ian; Saller, Richard P.; Scheidel, Walter (eds.). The Cambridge Economic History of the Greco-Roman World. Cambridge: Cambridge University Press. pp. 619–647.
- Maddison, Angus (2007). Contours of the World Economy, 1–2030 AD: Essays in Macro-Economic History. Oxford: Oxford University Press.
- Morris, Ian (2013). The Measure of Civilization. Princeton, New Jersey: Princeton University Press.
- Morris, Ian; Saller, Richard P.; Scheidel, Walter (2007). "Introduction". In Morris, Ian; Saller, Richard P.; Scheidel, Walter (eds.). The Cambridge Economic History of the Greco-Roman World. Cambridge: Cambridge University Press. pp. 1–12.
- Russell, J. C. (1958). "Late Ancient and Medieval Population". Transactions of the American Philosophical Society. 48 (3). Philadelphia: American Philosophical Society: 1–152. doi:10.2307/1005708. ISSN 0065-9746. JSTOR 1005708 – via Internet Archive.
- Ryan, Garrett (2021). Naked Statues, Fat Gladiators, and War Elephants: Frequently Asked Questions about the Ancient Greeks and Romans. Lanham: Rowman & Littlefield. ISBN 978-1-6338-8703-9 – via Google Books.
- Saller, Richard P. (1997). Patriarchy, Property and Death in the Roman Family. Cambridge: Cambridge University Press. ISBN 978-0-5215-9978-8 – via Google Books.
- Saller, Richard P. (2007). "Household and Gender". In Morris, Ian; Saller, Richard P.; Scheidel, Walter (eds.). The Cambridge Economic History of the Greco-Roman World. Cambridge: Cambridge University Press. pp. 87–112.
- Schwartz, Seth (2014). The Ancient Jews from Alexander to Muhammad. Cambridge University Press. ISBN 978-1-139-64947-6. Archived from the original on 13 December 2024.
- Scheidel, Walter (2001). "Roman Age Structure: Evidence and Models". Journal of Roman Studies. 91: 1–26. doi:10.1017/s0075435800015811.
- Scheidel, Waltger (April 2006). "Population and demography" (PDF). Princeton/Stanford Working Papers in Classics – via Princeton University.
- Scheidel, Walter (2007). "Demography". In Morris, Ian; Saller, Richard P.; Scheidel, Walter (eds.). The Cambridge Economic History of the Greco-Roman World. Cambridge: Cambridge University Press. pp. 38–86. doi:10.1017/CHOL9780521780537.004. ISBN 978-0-521-78053-7.
- Scheidel, Walter (2010). "Real Wages in Early Economies: Evidence for Living Standards from 1800 BCE to 1300 CE". Journal of the Economic and Social History of the Orient. 53 (3): 425–462. doi:10.1163/156852010x506038.
- Scheidel, Walter (2017). Debating Roman Demography. Leiden: Brill. ISBN 978-9-0043-5109-7 – via Google Books.
- Southern, Pat (2006). The Roman Army: A Social and Institutional History. Oxford: Oxford University Press.
- Temin, Peter (2006). "Estimating GDP in the Early Roman Empire". In Lo Cascio, Elio (ed.). Innovazione tecnica e progresso economico nel mondo romano (in Italian). Bari: Edipuglia. pp. 31–54.
- Sosin, Joshua D. (2000). "Tyrian stationarii at Puteoli". Tyche. 14 (1): 275–284. doi:10.15661/tyche.1999.014.23.
- Stefanile, Michele; Silani, Michele; Tardugno, Maria Luisa (2024). "The submerged Nabataean temple in Puteoli at Pozzuoli, Italy: first campaign of underwater research". Antiquity. 98 (400): e20. doi:10.15184/aqy.2024.107. ISSN 0003-598X.
- Wolf, Arthur P. (2005). Inbreeding, Incest, and the Incest Taboo: The State of Knowledge at the Turn of the Century. Stanford: Stanford University Press. ISBN 978-0-8047-5141-4 – via Google Books.
