= Digesta =

Digesta may refer to:

- The book Digesta seu Pandectae, also called "Pandects", see Digest (Roman law)
- Food undergoing digestion
