= Ulpian's life table =

Ulpian's life table is an ancient Roman annuities table. It is known through a passage, originating from the jurist Aemilius Macer, preserved in edited form in Justinian's Digest. The table appears to provide a rough outline of ancient Roman life expectancy. Although it is not clear what population the table refers to, or how its data was gathered, Richard Duncan-Jones has suggested that it refers to slaves and ex-slaves, who were often the object of testamentary maintenance grants.

Aemilius Macer probably lived in the 230s AD. He records the table in his systematic commentary on the lex Julia de vicesima hereditatium, an Augustan law of 6 AD that put a 5 percent tax on inheritances. Despite its many numbers, the fragment does not appear to be afflicted by any serious textual corruption.

== Table ==
Macer's text provides two figures: a forma, or schedule, presented by Ulpian (d. 223), and a customary (solitum est) schedule that antedates Ulpian's. The forma is described as a means of calculating tax for alimenta and usufructs. The age of the legatee is checked against the table; the figure recorded on the table is multiplied by annuity's annual value. Five percent of this last figure is what is owed in tax. Ulpian's life table gives figures broadly consistent with the Coale–Demeny Model West life table: female life expectancy at birth is 22.5 years, male life expectancy is 20.4. Its mortality figures are thus higher than those of most models, though the statistical flaws in the evidence itself has encouraged interpretative caution.

Although, among moderns, "life expectancy" tends to mean "the average number of years lived after age x", the table figures probably represent median life expectancy (i.e., the number of years elapsed before half the selected population is dead). After childhood, the two figures are quite close, but childhood mortality causes the figures for the first years of life to diverge. The figures given are too high to represent the predicted market value of the annuity at a conservative rate of return on capital (assuming the annual rate of 4%, the present value of an annuity for a person with a lifespan of sixty years would be approximately twenty-three times the annual value of the annuity, compared to 30 given in the table for the first group). The table therefore most likely represents the rate at which the annual tax payment on the annuity was staggered: a 5% tax was paid on each annual payment received by the legatee until the tax office had received the figure produced by the table. If the legatee died before the median age, leaving part of the tax unpaid, the tax would either be forgiven (out of sympathy for the family so bereaved) or added on to the tax fees of the legatee's heir.

Ulpian's life table and the customary life table
Annuitant's present age (x)	Corresponding figure	
Annuitant's present age (x)	Ulpian	Customary
0–19	30	30
20–24	28	30
25–29	25	30
30–34	22	(60-x)
35–39	20	(60-x)
40–49	(60-x-1)	(60-x)
50–54	9	(60-x)
55–59	7	(60-x)
60–	5	0 (?)
After Frier, "Roman life expectancy", 217, table 1.

Frier states that the table does not plausibly represent life expectancy either in early childhood, between forty and fifty, or after sixty. This may be because these ages were difficult for the creators of the table to handle, or because they may have been easily ignored; children do not often receive annuities, for example. Despite these errors, the table corresponds well to other observed populations with abnormally high mortality rates (such as postwar Mauritius), and to a priori constructions of plausible Roman age structures. The picture the table presents is appalling: a society with one of the highest mortality rates on record, with a predicted life expectancy at birth of between 19 and 23.

Keith Hopkins called the table not "demographically possible". Richard P. Saller concluded that the table "includes too many schematic and unrealistic elements" to persuade him that it was "based on good data using appropriate demographic techniques". Richard Duncan-Jones observes that the corresponding figure for Mauritius – a male life expectancy at birth of 32.25 – far exceeded the table figure of 21.11, as did all the corresponding readings from the Princeton South model life table. The implied reproduction rate under the table is accordingly very high, and perhaps higher than any rate observed in modern history.

Duncan-Jones suggests that the subjects of Ulpian's table were largely slaves or ex-slaves. Ulpian's life table was produced to assess the value of bequests of maintenance annuities in money or in kind, and specifically for maintenance grants, which ceased on the death of the recipient. The beneficiaries of life annuities were typically members of the decedent's household, which meant slaves or ex-slaves. Pliny the Younger's will, for example, supported 100 of his freedmen. If Ulpian's table is empirical, it would reflect life expectancy of this population, to which it would have been applied. As such, its figures may be relatively plausible, if very crude.

== Text and translation ==
Aemilius Macer (2 ad Leg. Vic. Hered.).

Computationi in alimentis faciendae hanc formam esse Ulpianus scribit, ut a prima aetate usque ad annum vicesimum quantitas alimentorum triginta annorum computetur eiusque quantitatis Falcidia (Macer: vicesima) praestetur, ab annis vero viginti usque ad annum vicesimum quintum annorum viginti octo, ab annis viginti quinque usque ad annos triginta annorum viginti quinque, ab annis triginta usque ad annos triginta quinque annorum viginti duo, ab annis triginta quinque usque ad annos quadraginta annorum viginti. ab annis quadraginta usque ad annos quinquaginta tot annorum computatio fit, quot aetati eius ad annum sexagesimum deerit remisso uno anno: ab anno vero quinquagesimo usque ad annum quinquagesimum quintum annorum novem, ab annis quinquaginta quinque usque ad annum sexagesimum annorum septem, ab annis sexaginta, cuiuscumque aetatis sit, annorum quinque. eoque nos iure uti Ulpianus ait et circa computationem usus fructus faciendam. solitum est tamen a prima aetate usque ad annum trigesimum computationem annorum triginta fieri, ab annis vero triginta tot annorum computationem inire, quot ad annum sexagesimum deesse videntur. numquam ergo amplius quam triginta annorum computatio initur. sic denique et si rei publicae usus fructus legetur, sive simpliciter sive ad ludos, triginta annorum computatio fit.

[Aemilius] Macer, On the Law of Five Per Cent Tax of Estates, Book II.

Ulpianus says that the following rule should be adopted in making the estimate of maintenance to be furnished. The amount bequeathed to anyone for this purpose from the first to the twentieth year is computed to have lasted for thirty years, and the Falcidian portion of that sum shall be reserved. From twenty to twenty-five years, the amount is calculated for twenty-eight years, from twenty to thirty years, the amount is calculated for twenty-five years; from thirty to thirty-five years, the amount is calculated for twenty-two years, from thirty to forty years, it is computed for twenty years; from forty to fifty years, the computation is made for as many years as the party lacks of the sixtieth year after having omitted one year; from the fiftieth to the fifty-fifth, the amount is calculated for nine years; from the fifty-fifth to the sixtieth year, it is calculated for seven years; and for any age above sixty, no matter what it may be, the computation is made for five years. Ulpianus also says that we use this same rule in making the calculation with reference to the legacy of an usufruct. Nevertheless, it is the practice for the computation to be made for thirty years from the first to the thirtieth, but after the age of thirty years it is made for as many years as the legatee lacks of being sixty; hence the computation is never made for a longer time than thirty years. Finally, in like manner, the computation is made for the period of thirty years, where the usufruct of property is bequeathed to the State, either simply, or for the purpose of celebrating games.

Digest 35.2.68, tr. S. P. Scott

== See also ==
- Life annuity
