= Ulpian =

Early 3rd century Roman jurist

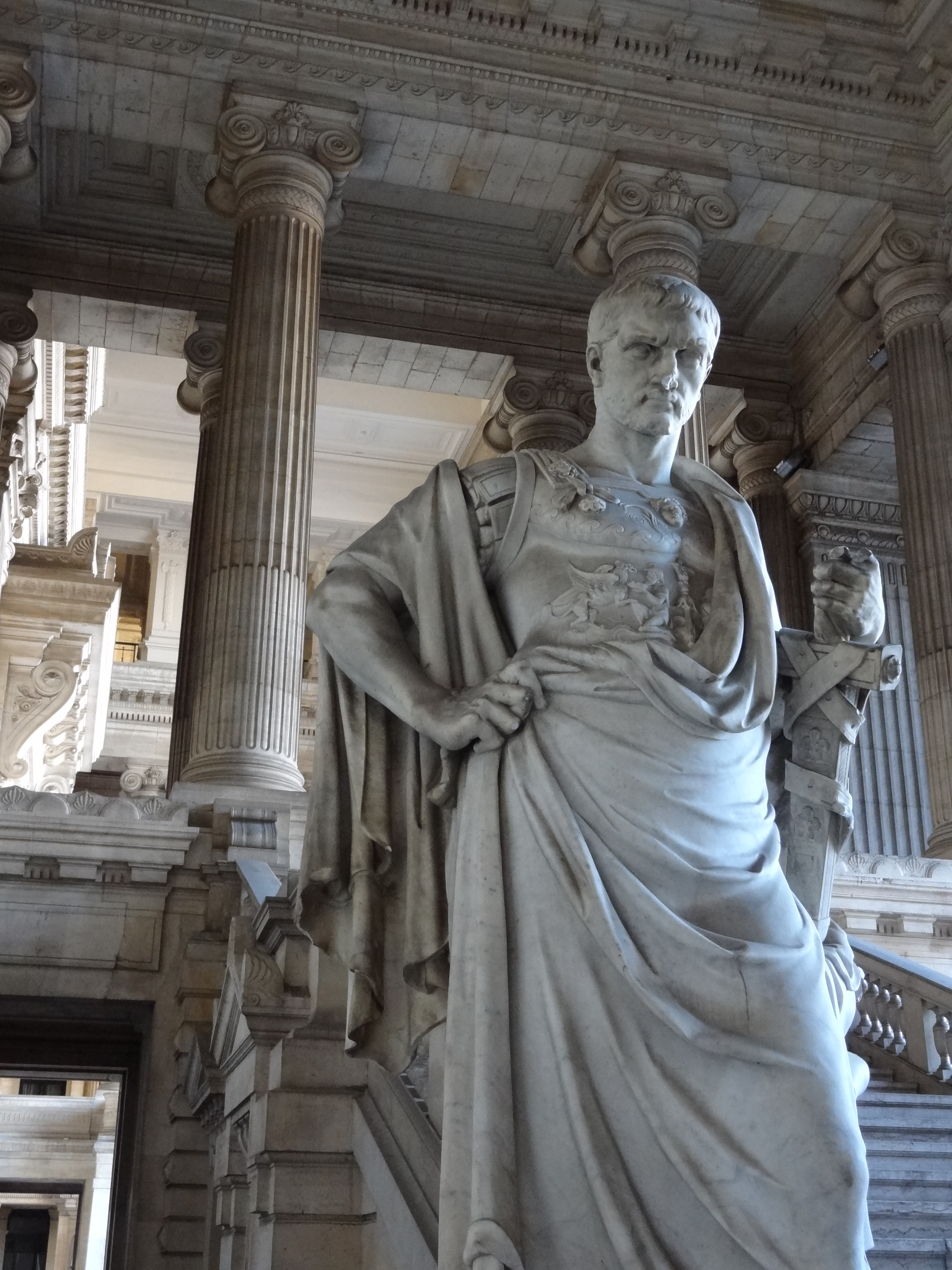
- 19th-century statue of Ulpian in the neoclassical Palais de Justice in Brussels, Belgium
- Born: 170 AD; Tyre, Roman Syria
- Died: 228 AD (aged 57–58); Rome
- Occupation: Jurist
- Known for: Digest

Ulpian (/ˈʌlpiən/; Latin: Gnaeus Domitius Annius Ulpianus; c. 170 – 223 or 228) was a Roman jurist, born in Tyre in Roman Syria (modern Lebanon). He moved to Rome and rose to become considered one of the great legal authorities of his time. He was one of the five jurists upon whom decisions were to be based according to the Law of Citations of Valentinian III, and supplied the Justinian Digest about a third of its contents.

== Biography ==
The Digest, compiled by Justinian I in 530-533 CE, in quoting Ulpian himself, informs that the jurist was born in Tyre, Roman Syria:

Ulpianus 1 de cens.

"Sciendum est esse quasdam colonias iuris italici, ut est in syria phoenice splendidissima tyriorum colonia, unde mihi origo est, nobilis regionibus, serie saeculorum antiquissima, armipotens, foederis quod cum romanis percussit tenacissima: huic enim divus severus et imperator noster ob egregiam in rem publicam imperiumque romanum insignem fidem ius italicum dedit:"

Ulpian 1 on the census.

"It is to be known that there are certain colonies of Italian law, as in Syria there is Phoenicia, a most splendid colony of the Tyrians, from which I have my origin, noble in the regions, most ancient in a series of centuries, powerful in arms, most tenacious in the treaty which he made with the Romans: for to this our divine Severus and emperor, for his excellent loyalty to the republic and the Roman empire, gave Italian law:″

He was most literarily active between CE 211 and 222. He made his first appearance in public life as assessor in the auditorium of Papinian and member of the council of Septimius Severus; under Caracalla he was master of the requests (magister libellorum). Elagabalus (also known as Heliogabalus) banished him from Rome, but on the accession of Severus Alexander (222) he was reinstated, and finally became the emperor's chief adviser and Praefectus Praetorio.

During the Severan dynasty, the position of praetorian prefect in Italy came increasingly to resemble a general administrative post, and there was a tendency to appoint jurists such as Papinian, who occupied the post from 203 until his elimination and execution at the ascent of Caracalla. Under Severus Alexander the praetorian prefecture was held by Ulpian until his assassination by the Guard in the presence of the Emperor himself.

His curtailment of the privileges granted to the Praetorian Guard by Elagabalus provoked their enmity, and he narrowly escaped their vengeance; ultimately, he was murdered in the palace by the Guard, possibly in the course of a riot between the soldiers and the mob.

He had a luxurious villa at Santa Marinella on the coast north of Rome.

== Works ==
His works include Ad Sabinum, a commentary on the ius civile, in over 50 books; Ad edictum, a commentary on the Edict, in 83 books; collections of opinions, responses and disputations; books of rules and institutions; treatises on the functions of the different magistrates — one of them, the De officio proconsulis libri x., being a comprehensive exposition of the criminal law; monographs on various statutes, on testamentary trusts, and a variety of other works. His writings altogether have supplied to Justinian's Digest about a third of its contents, and his commentary on the Edict alone about a fifth. As an author, he is characterized by doctrinal exposition of a high order, judiciousness of criticism, and lucidity of arrangement, style, and language. He is also credited with the first life table ever.

Domitii Ulpiani fragmenta, consisting of 29 titles, were first edited by Tilius (Paris, 1549). Other editions are by Hugo (Berlin, 1834), Booking (Bonn, 1836), containing fragments of the first book of the Institutiones discovered by Endlicher at Vienna in 1835, and in Girard's Textes de droit romain (Paris, 1890).

== Legacy ==
In the study of law, Ulpian may be best remembered for the phrase "Juris praecepta sunt haec: honeste vivere, alterum non laedere, suum cuique tribuere" (The basic principles of law are: to live honorably, not to harm any other person, to render each his own). The maxim "Dominus membrorum suorum nemo videtur" (No one is to be regarded as the owner of his own limbs) is also attributed to Ulpian (Edict, D9).

It had been assumed for a long time that Ulpian of Tyre was a model for Athenaeus' Ulpian in The Deipnosophists, or The Banquet of the Learned. Athenaeus makes 'Ulpian' out to be a grammarian and philologist, characterised by his customary interjections: "Where does this word occur in writing?". He is represented as a symposiarch and he occupies a couch alone; his death is passed over in silence in Book XV 686c. Scholars today agree that Athenaeus's Ulpian is not the historical Ulpian, but possibly his father.

A potential date of the real Ulpian's death, 228 AD, has been wrongly used to estimate the date of completion of The Deipnosophists. However, the year of his death cannot be determined with certainty. Robert Lee Cleve makes a compelling case that Ulpian died in 223, citing a papyrus discovered in 1966.

== Editions ==
- Angelosanto, Antonio; Marotta, Valerio; Pulitanò, Francesca; Schiavone, Aldo; Tamburi, Francesca, eds. (2023). Cnaeus Domitius Ulpianus. Ad edictum libri IV-VII. Scriptores iuris Romani, 16. Rome: L’Erma di Bretschneider. ISBN 9788891320582.

== See also ==
- Herennius Modestinus
- Julius Paulus
