= Law of Citations =

Roman legal principle (issued 426)

The Law of Citations (Lex citationum) was a Roman law issued from Ravenna in AD 426 by the emperor Valentinian III, or rather by his regent mother, Galla Placidia Augusta, to the Senate and the people of Rome, and it was included in both Theodosius II's law compilation of 438 (Codex Theodosianus 1, 4, 3) and the first edition of the Codex Justinianus.

== Aim ==
It was designed to help judges deal with vast amounts of jurist writings on a subject and thus to reach a decision. According to the legal historian Alan Watson, "This Law of Citations marks a low point of Roman jurisprudence, since [it declares] the correct opinion is to be found by counting heads, not by choosing the best solution". Nonetheless, it was "exhibiting no mean instinct of statesmanship" and may be viewed as an attempt to simplify adjudication in practice, "in opposition to the growing ignorance and ubiquitous corruption and injustice of the times".

== Content ==
Authority was given to Ulpianus, Gaius, Paulus, Papinianus and Modestinus, as they were some of the outstanding jurists of the classical period. Quotations used by the jurists were also given authority. If there was a conflict between the jurists, the majority view would prevail. In the event of an even number of views on each side, the view of Papinianus would be applied. If Papinianus expressed no opinion, the judge would then be free to use his own judgement. Lesser classical jurists could also be cited on the condition that at least two relevant manuscripts could be collated to verify their proper citation. That would have been important, especially in situations of the works of the lesser jurists being scarce and therefore suspect.
