= Julius Paulus =

Roman jurist (late 2nd/early 3rd century)

Julius Paulus (Greek: Ἰούλιος Παῦλος; fl. 2nd century and 3rd century AD), often simply referred to as Paul in English, was one of the most influential and distinguished Roman jurists. He was also a praetorian prefect under the Roman Emperor Alexander Severus.

== Life ==
Little is known of the life and family of Paulus; he was a man of Greek descent, who originated from an unknown Phoenician town in Roman Syria or from Patavium, Roman Italy (modern Padua, Italy). The possibility that Paulus could come from Patavium is based on a statue with an inscription found in Patavium dedicated to a Paulus.

During the reign of emperors Septimius Severus and Caracalla, Paulus served as a jurist. He was exiled by the emperor Elagabalus and recalled from exile by his successor, emperor Alexander Severus. Severus and his mother Julia Avita Mamaea in 222, appointed him among the emperor's chief advisers and between 228 and 235, he was the Praetorian prefect of the Praetorian Guard. Paulus was a contemporary of the jurist Ulpian. He partly followed the career path of former Praetorian prefect Aemilius Papinianus. In a constitution of the emperor Gordian III dating from 239 and referring to the marriage, where is cited a response of Paul, he is called vir prudentissimus Paulus (C.J. 5.4.6).

== Paulus's legal works ==
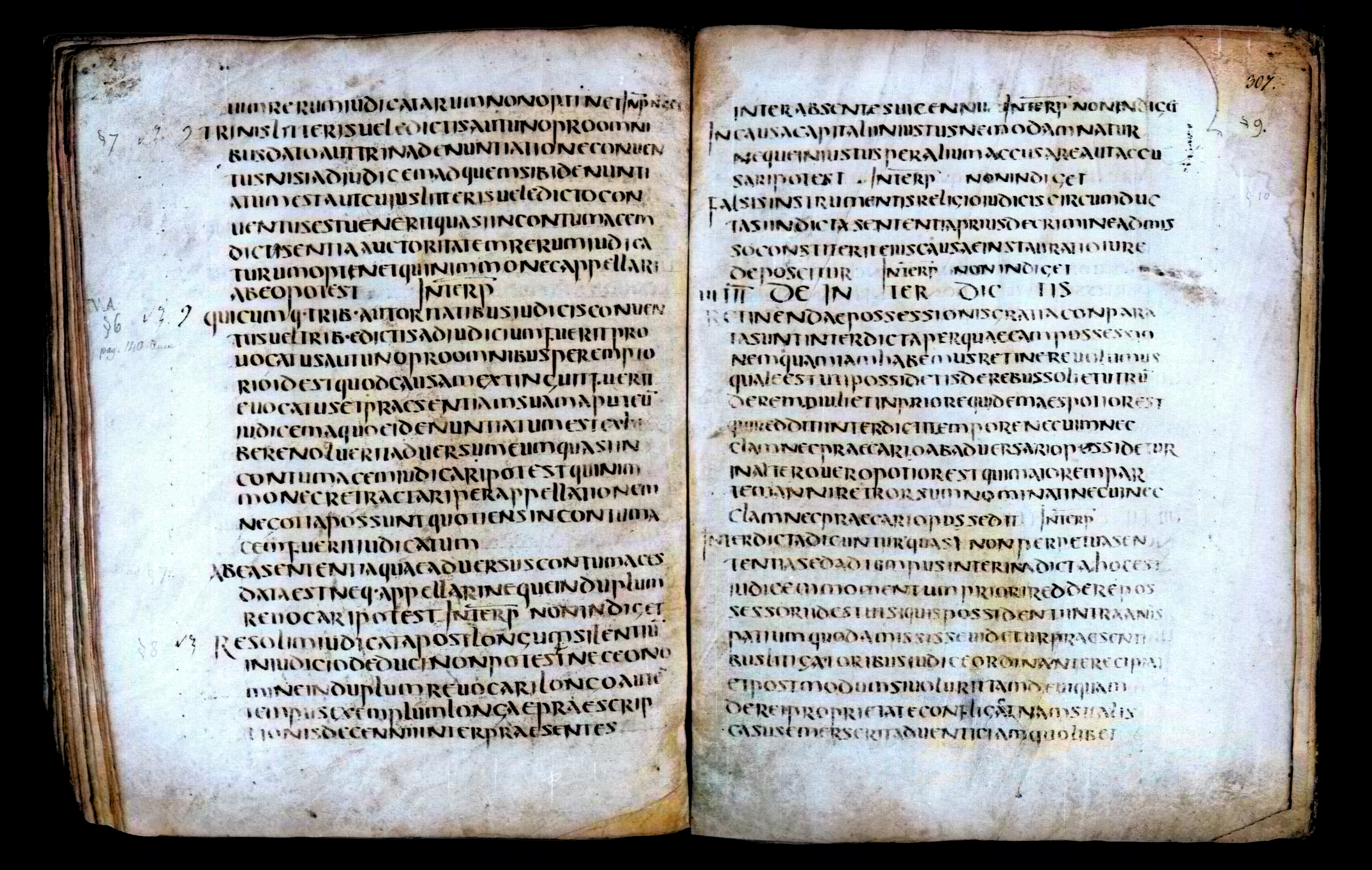
Excerpt from Sententiae Receptae (5.5–5.6) by Julius Paulus in the Breviary of Alaric from a 6th century manuscript

The Roman jurist Herennius Modestinus describes Paulus, along with Ulpian and Quintus Cervidius Scaevola, as among "the last of the great jurists". Paulus's work was held in high respect.

He had written 319 various legal publications. His surviving works are extremely prolific, displaying a keen analysis of other opinions of jurists and Paulus expressed his legal views. He appears to have written on a great variety on legal subjects and had a thorough knowledge of legal subjects and law.

Paulus comments on the jurists Javolenus Priscus, Quintus Cervidius Scaevola, Marcus Antistius Labeo, Salvius Julianus and Aemilius Papinianus. He is cited by the jurists Macer and Herennius Modestinus. His writing style is condensed and sometimes obscure; however, his work is just as good as the other Roman jurists'. Paulus's work has survived from excerpts, although his work needs to be carefully read to be understood.

Paulus was one of the five jurists whose opinions were made constitutionally authoritative in 426 by Roman Emperors Theodosius II and Valentinian III. Another legacy from Paulus is the inclusion of his writings in the Digest which was written and put together by Byzantine Emperor Justinian I.

One sixth of the Corpus Juris Civilis in the Digest consists of Paulus's work. He is the most excerpted Roman jurist in the Digest, ahead of Ulpian. The Digest attributes to Paulus the first articulation of the presumption of innocence in Roman law: Ei incumbit probatio qui dicit, non qui negat—"Proof lies on him who asserts, not on him who denies". Paulus in the Digest is also referred in two passages, which he gave a contrary opinion to Alexander Severus, but Severus chose Papinianus's opinion.

== Pseudo-Pauline works ==
Due to his fame, several other works have been attributed to him, in particular the 3rd century compilation Pauli sententiae ("Paul's Views" or "Sentences"). From Paulus's surviving works and works attributed to him, the Sententiae ad Filium have the longest fragments.

== Economics ==
In the Digest, Paulus wrote a passage on money. Paulus presented a theory of money, similar to Aristotle, similar to the still sometimes abiding theory that it had arisen from the inconvenience of barter (i.e. with a presumption of an initial in-kind or "barter" exchange economy preceding money) due to the "lack of coincidence of wants" in neoclassical terminology.

== Editions ==
- Ruggiero, Iolanda, ed. (2023). Iulius Paulus, Ad legem iuliam et papiam libri X. Roma Bristol: L'Erma di Bretschneider. ISBN 9788891319968.

== See also ==
- Law of Citations
