= Digest (Roman law) =

Roman law digest

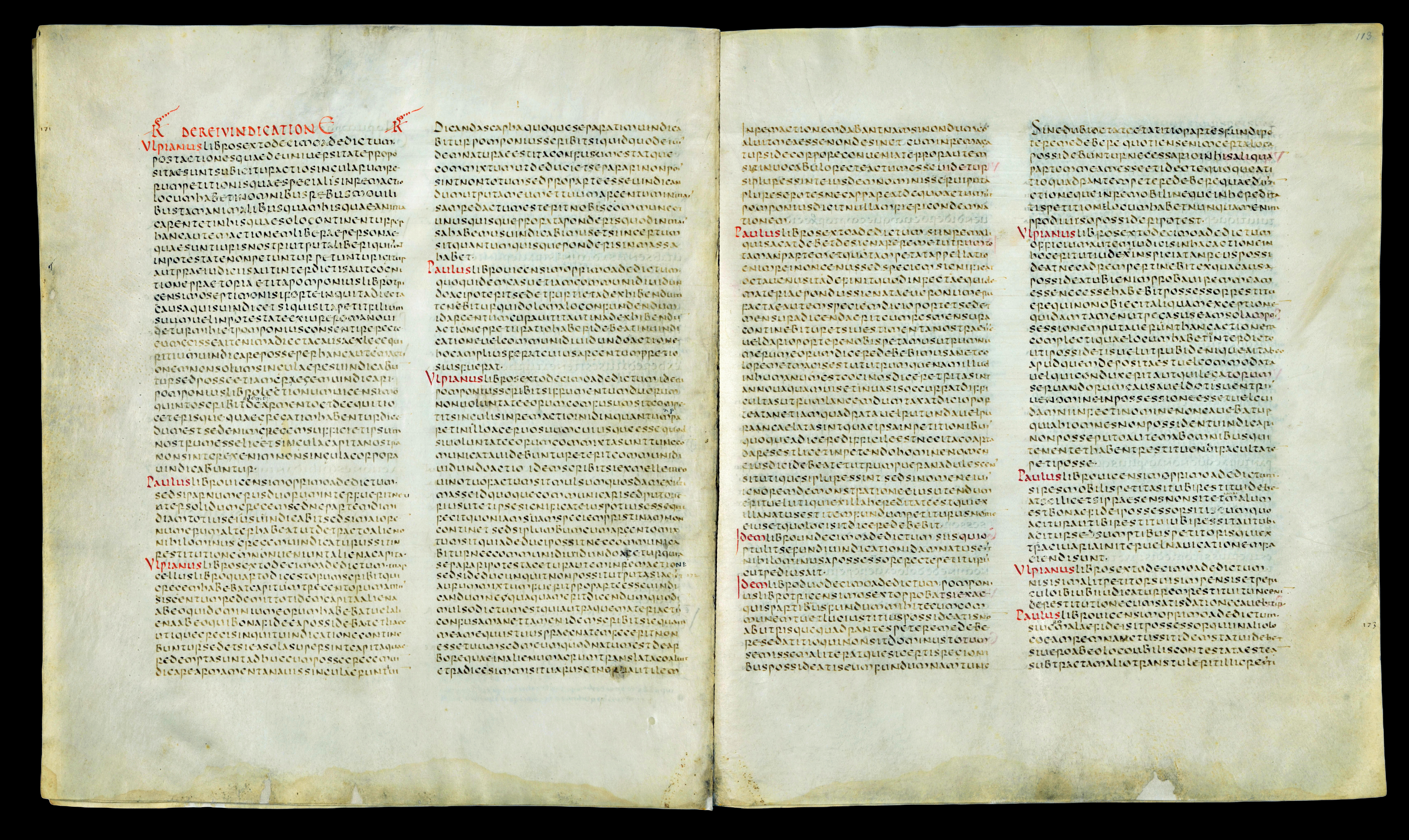
Digest excerpt (D. 6.1) about the rei vindicatio compiling the opinions of the Ulpian and Paulus – text from the 6th-century Littera Florentina

The Digest (Latin: Digesta), also known as the Pandects (Pandectae; Ancient Greek: Πανδέκται, Pandéktai, "All-Containing"), was a compendium or digest of juristic writings on Roman law compiled by order of the Byzantine emperor Justinian I (r. 527–565) in 530–533 AD. It comprises 50 books.

The Digest formed one part of Justinian's reduction and codification of all Roman laws up to his time. The other two parts were a collection of statutes, the Codex (Code), which survives in a second edition of 534; and an introductory textbook, the Institutes – Justinian gave all three parts the force of law; in the 16th century the whole work came to be known as the Corpus Juris Civilis (lit. 'Body of Civil Law'. (Note: To distinguish it from the Corpus Juris Canonici – the "Body of Canon Law".) The set was intended to be complete, but Justinian passed further legislation, later collected separately as the Novellae Constitutiones (New Laws or, conventionally, the Novels).

== History ==
The original Codex Justinianus was promulgated in April of 529 by the C. "Summa". This made it the only source of imperial law, and repealed all earlier codifications. However, it permitted reference to ancient jurists whose writings had been regarded as authoritative. Under Theodosus II's Law of Citations, the writings of Papinian, Paulus, Ulpian, Modestinus, and Gaius were made the primary juristic authorities who could be cited in court. Others cited by them also could be referred to, but their views had to be "informed by a comparison of manuscripts".

The principal surviving manuscript is the Littera Florentina of the late sixth or early seventh century. In the Middle Ages, the Digest was divided into three parts, and most of the manuscripts contain only one of these parts. The entire Digest was first translated into English in 1985 by the Scottish legal scholar Alan Watson.

The Digest was discovered in Amalfi in 1135, prompting a revival of learning of Roman law throughout Europe. Other sources claim it was discovered in 1070 and formed a major impetus for the founding of the first university in Europe, the University of Bologna (1088).

== Conflicts of law ==
The codified authorities often conflicted. Therefore, Justinian ordered these conflicts to be settled and fifty of these were published as the "quinquaginta decisiones" (fifty decisions). Soon after, he further decreed that the works of these ancient writers, which totalled over 1,500 books, be condensed into fifty books. These were to be entitled Digesta in Latin and Pandectae or Pandéktai (Πανδέκται) in Greek. In response to this order of December 15, 530 ("Deo auctore"), Tribonian created a commission of sixteen members to do the work—one government official, four professors, and eleven advocates.

The commission was given the power to condense and alter the texts in order to simplify, clarify, and eliminate conflicts among them. The Digest's organization is complex: each of the fifty books is divided into several titles, each containing several extracts, and many of the extracts have several parts or paragraphs. Research in the modern era has created a highly probable picture of how the commission carried out its task.

== Contents ==
Approximately two-fifths of the Digest consists of the writings of Ulpian, while some one-sixth belongs to Paulus. The work was declared to be the sole source of non-statute law: commentaries on the compilation were forbidden, or even the citing of the original works of the jurists for the explaining of ambiguities in the text. One opinion written by Paulus at the beginning of the Crisis of the Third Century in 235 AD about the Lex Rhodia ("Rhodian law") articulates the general average principle of marine insurance established on the island of Rhodes in approximately 1000 to 800 BC as a member of the Doric Hexapolis, plausibly by the Phoenicians during the proposed Dorian invasion and emergence of the purported Sea Peoples during the Greek Dark Ages (c. 1100–750 BC) that led to the proliferation of the Doric Greek dialect. The law of general average constitutes the fundamental principle that underlies all insurance. Also, in an opinion dated to approximately 220 AD during the reign of Elagabalus (218–222) of the Severan dynasty, Ulpian compiled a life table that would later be submitted in an article to the Journal of the Institute of Actuaries in 1851 by future U.S. Supreme Court Associate Justice Joseph P. Bradley (1870–1892), a former actuary for the Mutual Benefit Life Insurance Company.

== Editions ==
English translations have been published by Samuel Parsons Scott (1932) and Alan Watson (1985), the latter based on the Latin text published by Theodor Mommsen in 1878.

== See also ==
- Byzantine law
- Civil code
- Corpus Juris Canonici
- Corpus Juris Civilis
- International Roman Law Moot Court
- Law of Citations
- List of Roman laws
