= Herennius Modestinus =

3rd century Roman jurist

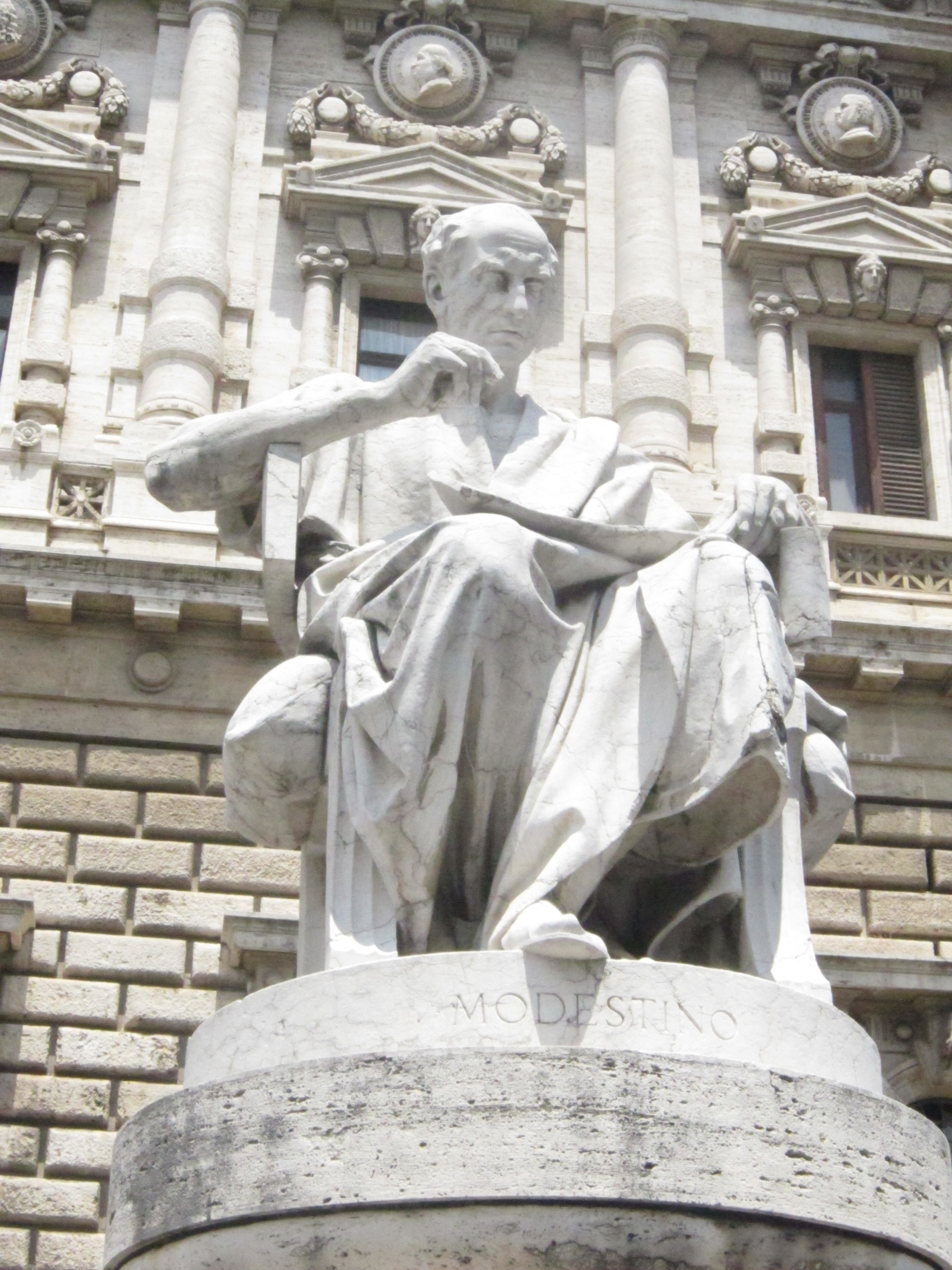

Herennius Modestinus, or simply Modestinus, was a civil servant and a celebrated Roman jurist, a student of Ulpian who flourished about 250 AD.

He appears to have been a native of one of the Greek-speaking provinces, or probably Dalmatia. Possibly from 223 to 225 AD he was secretary a libellis under Emperor Alexander Severus, and about 228 he was praefectus vigilum. In Valentinian's Law of Citations he is classed with Papinian, Paulus, Gaius and Ulpian, as one of the five jurists whose recorded views were considered decisive. He is considered to be the last great jurist of the classic age of Roman law.

He is mentioned in a rescript of Gordian III in the year 240 in connection with a responsum which he gave to the party to whom the rescript was addressed. No fewer than 345 passages in the Digest of the Corpus Juris Civilis are taken from his writings. He is the author of a collection of Responsa and Digesta written in 12 books.
