= Olivia F. Robinson =

Olivia Fiona Robinson, FRSE, FRHistS (née O'Brien; born November 1938) is an Irish-British legal scholar and legal historian, specialising in Roman law. She joined the Department of Civil Law in the University of Glasgow in 1966, and rose to serve as Douglas Professor of Roman Law from 2001 to 2006.

== Biography ==
Olivia Fiona O'Brien was born in November 1938 in Dublin, Ireland. She studied modern history (i.e. post-ancient history) at the University of Oxford, graduating with a Bachelor of Arts (BA) degree in 1960. She specialised in the Later Roman Empire and chose St Augustine as her special subject. She married Sebastian Robinson in 1960 and they had one child together in each of the next two years. She then returned to her studies and undertook a Doctor of Philosophy (PhD) degree at the University of London, which she completed in 1965.

In 2006, she was elected Fellow of the Royal Society of Edinburgh (FRSE). She is also a Fellow of the Royal Historical Society (FRHistS), and had been elected a corresponding member of the Austrian Academy of Sciences in 1993.

== Selected works ==
- Robinson, O. F.; Fergus, T. D.; Gordon, William M. (1985). An introduction to European legal history. Abingdon, Oxon: Professional Books. ISBN 9780862051075.
- Robinson, O. F. (1995). The register of Walter Bronescombe: Bishop of Exeter, 1258–1280. Vol. I. Woodbridge: Canterbury and York Society; Boydell. ISBN 978-0907239512.
- Robinson, O. F. (1995). The criminal law of ancient Rome. London: Duckworth. ISBN 9780715626634.
- Robinson, O. F. (1999). The register of Walter Bronescombe, Bishop of Exeter, 1258–1280. Vol. II. Woodbridge: Canterbury and York Society; Boydell. ISBN 978-0907239574.
- Robinson, O. F. (2003). Ancient Rome: City Planning and Administration. Routledge. ISBN 978-1-134-84494-4.
- Robinson, O. F. (2003). The register of Walter Bronescombe, Bishop of Exeter, 1258–1280. Vol. III. Woodbridge: Canterbury and York Society; Boydell. ISBN 978-0907239642.
- Robinson, O. F. (2006). The Sources of Roman Law: Problems and Methods for Ancient Historians. Routledge. ISBN 978-1-134-87777-5.
- Robinson, O. F. (2007). Penal practice and penal policy in ancient Rome. London: Routledge. ISBN 9780203965542.
