= Legacy of Cato the Younger =

Impact of Roman politician and Stoic

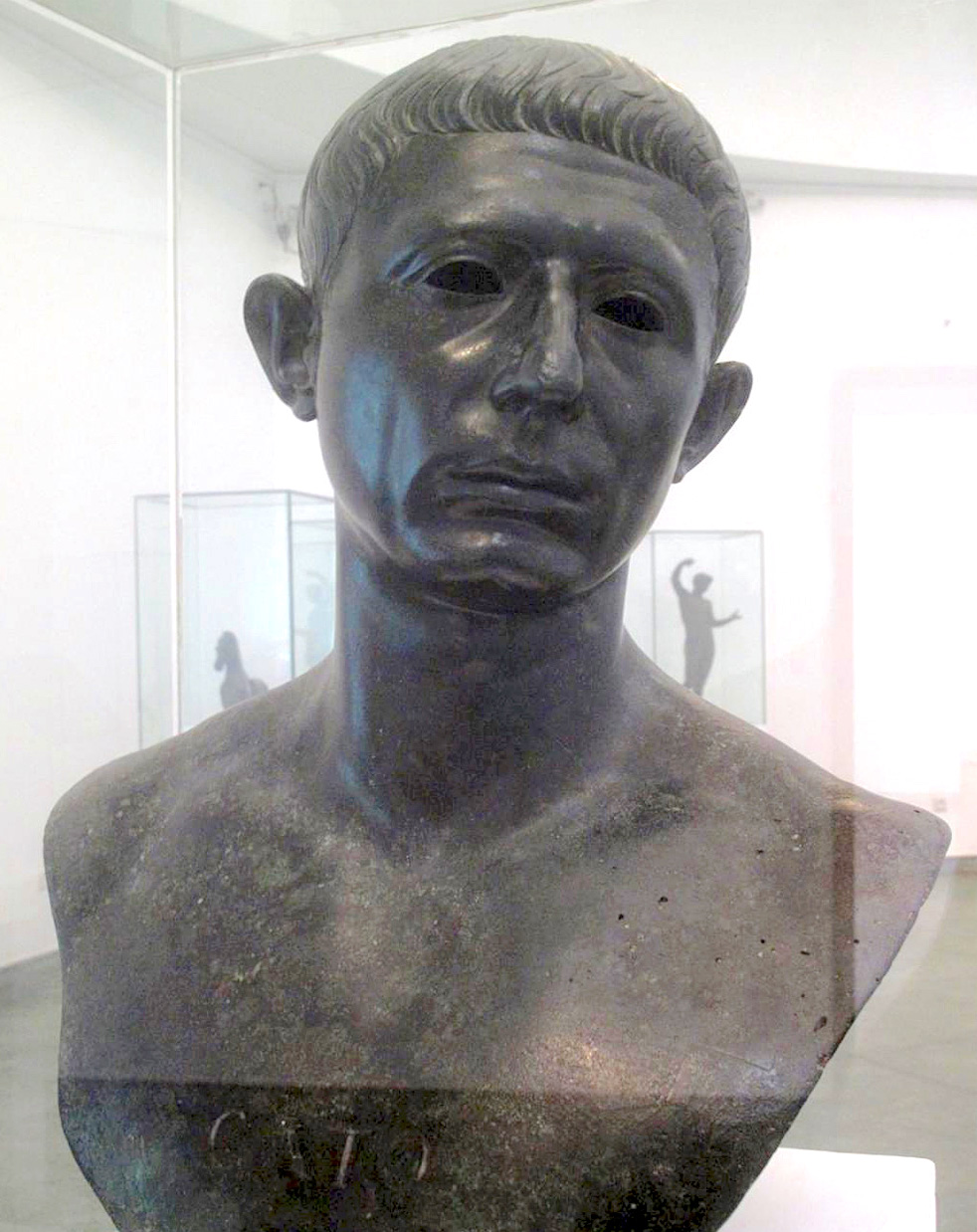
An inscribed bronze bust of Cato the Younger.

Cato the Younger (95 BC – 46 BC) was an Ancient Roman politician during the late republic. He was famous in ancient times and through to the modern era as an exemplar of moral virtue and as a martyr for the Roman republic.

== Antiquity ==
Cato, who upheld the strong traditional Roman principles, was remembered particularly well. His suicide was seen as a symbol for those who followed the conservative, Optimate principles of the traditional Roman. Cato was a follower of Stoicism and was one of the most active defenders of the Republic. The Stoics, from at least the time of Chrysippus onward, taught that the wise man should engage in politics if nothing prevents him. Cato's high moral standards and incorruptible virtue gained him several followers—of whom Marcus Favonius was the most well known—as well as praise even from his political enemies, such as Sallust—one of the sources for the anecdote about Caesar and Cato's sister. Sallust also wrote a comparison between Cato and Caesar. Caesar, Cato's long-time rival, was praised for his mercy, compassion, and generosity, and Cato, for his discipline, rigidity, and moral integrity. One should, however, consider which of these men Sallust found the more appealing. After Cato's death, both pro- and anti-Cato treatises appeared; among them Cicero wrote a panegyric, entitled Cato, to which Caesar, who never forgave him for all the obstructions, answered with his Anti-Cato. Caesar's pamphlet has not survived, but some of its contents may be inferred from Plutarch's Life of Cato, which repeats many of the stories that Caesar put forward in his Anti-Cato. Plutarch specifically mentions the accounts of Cato's close friend Munatius Rufus and the later Neronian senator Thrasea Paetus as references used for parts of his biography of Cato. While Caesar proclaimed clemency towards all, he never forgave Cato. This stance was something that others in the anti-Caesarian camp would remember, including Cato's nephew and posthumous son-in-law Brutus.

Republicans under the Empire remembered him fondly, and the poet Virgil, writing under Augustus, made Cato a hero in his Aeneid. Whilst it was not particularly safe to praise Cato, Augustus did tolerate and appreciate Cato. Whilst one might argue that heaping posthumous praise on Cato highlights one's opposition to the new shape of Rome without directly challenging Augustus, it was actually later generations who were more able to embrace the role model of Cato without the fear of prosecution. Certainly under Nero, the resurgence of republican ambitions, with Cato as their ideal, ended in death for such figures as Seneca and Lucan, but Cato continued nevertheless as a righteous ideal for generations to come.

Lucan, writing under Nero, also made Cato the hero of the later books of his epic Pharsalia. From the latter work originates the epigram Victrix causa deis placuit sed victa Catoni ("The conquering cause pleased the gods, but the conquered cause pleased Cato", Lucan 1.128). Other Imperial authors, such as Horace, the Tiberian authors Velleius Paterculus and Valerius Maximus along with Lucan and Seneca in the 1st century AD, and later authors, such as Appian and Dio, celebrated the historical importance of Cato the Younger in their own writings.

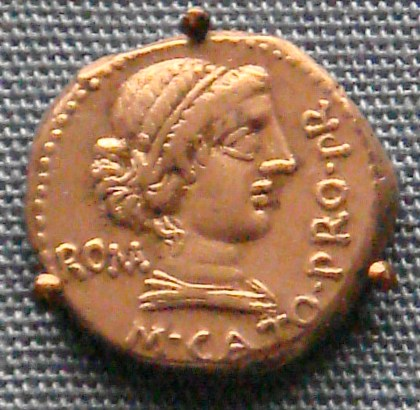
Silver denarius of Cato (47–46 BC)

== Middle Ages ==
In Dante Alighieri's Divine Comedy, Cato is portrayed as the guardian of the mountain of Purgatory (Cantos I–II). Cato is one of the two pagans presented by Dante in Purgatorio, the other being Statius. Whilst Cato's suicide warranted a placement of his soul in the seventh circle of Hell, Dante bases his decision to place Cato in Purgatory on Roman ethics instead of Christian ethics. Since Cato was a follower of Stoicism, he represents leading a virtuous life free from sin. Hence, Cato embodies the cardinal virtues and is referred to as an analogue of God by Dante. To Dante, Cato's suicide was a sacrifice for a just cause because he sought to preserve the freedom of the Roman Republic. Given his imperfect actions, Cato is not allowed into Purgatory proper; he instead exists on the shores of the "High Mount" in part of ante-purgatory.

Cato appears in Purgatorio not as a soul who is purifying himself of their sins but holds a more administrative role in the realm. Here, Cato welcomes the new souls who arrive on the shores of Purgatory in an angel-led ship. Cato is depicted as a solitary old man and a figure of reverence. Contrary to his unkempt depiction in Lucan's Pharsalia, Cato's appearance in Divine Comedy is carefully designed to be enclosed in light. References to the four holy stars on Cato's beard strengthen his association with the cardinal virtues. At the shores of Mount Purgatory, Cato sternly questions the pilgrim's and Virgil's intentions as they are breaking the rules of the world by being here. After Virgil convinces Cato of their journey, Cato imparts geographical information on Mount Purgatory to the pilgrim and Virgil before promptly disappearing, preparing Dante the pilgrim for the climb of Mount Purgatory. In Canto II, Cato urges Virgil and the pilgrim to make haste and ascend to Mount Purgatory.

== Early Modernity (1500–1800) ==
The 16th-century French writer and philosopher Michel de Montaigne was fascinated by the example of Cato, the incident being mentioned in multiple of his Essais, above all in Du Jeune Caton in Book I. Whether the example of Cato was a potential ethical model or a simply unattainable standard troubled him in particular, Cato proving to be Montaigne's favoured role-model in the earlier Essais before he later chose to follow the example of Socrates instead.

Cato was lionized during the republican revolutions of the Enlightenment. Joseph Addison's famous play Cato, a Tragedy, first staged on April 14, 1713, celebrated Cato as a martyr to the republican cause. Based on the last days of Cato the Younger, it deals with such themes as individual liberty vs. government tyranny, republicanism vs. monarchism, logic vs. emotion and Cato's personal struggle to cleave to his beliefs in the face of death. The play was a popular and critical success: it was staged more than 20 times in London alone, and it was published across 26 editions before the end of the century. This play had a great influence on George Washington, who often quoted it and arranged to have it performed at Valley Forge in the winter of 1777–1778 in spite of a Congressional ban on such performances. Portuguese Romantic poet Almeida Garrett also wrote a tragedy titled Catão (Cato), featuring the last days of Cato's life and his struggle against Julius Caesar, a fight between virtue (Cato) and vice (Caesar), democracy (Cato) and tyranny (Caesar). In the 18th century, several distinguished composers set to music the Metastasio libretto, Catone in Utica, among them, Leonardo Leo, Leonardo Vinci, J. C. Bach, Antonio Vivaldi, Handel, Paisiello, Jommelli, Johann Adolf Hasse and Piccinni, in two versions.

A collection of letters on the topic of republicanism were published in the early 18th century under the title Cato's Letters, using Cato as a pseudonym. The libertarian Cato Institute think tank was later named after this work.

The death of Cato (La mort de Caton d'Utique) was a popular theme in revolutionary France, being sculpted by Philippe-Laurent Roland (1782) and painted by Bouchet Louis André Gabriel, Bouillon Pierre, and Guérin Pierre Narcisse in 1797. The title-page of the third book ("Of Morals") of David Hume's A Treatise of Human Nature features an epigraph from Lucan's Pharsalia (Book IX) which serves as the prelude to Cato's celebrated speech at the oracle of Jupiter Ammon – a speech that was taken by Hume and other thinkers of the Enlightenment to be an exemplar of freethinking. The sculpture of Cato by Jean-Baptiste Roman and François Rude from 1832 stands in the Musée du Louvre.

== Late Modernity (1800–1900) ==
In Mary Shelley's Frankenstein, Clerval, in an attempt to comfort his friend dismayed over the recent news of his young brother William's murder, remarks to Frankenstein that "even Cato wept over the dead body of his brother". Herman Melville's novel Moby-Dick refers to Cato in the first paragraph: "With a philosophical flourish Cato throws himself upon his sword; I quietly take to the ship".

== Contemporary media ==
Cato is a major character in several novels of Colleen McCullough's Masters of Rome series. He is portrayed as a stubborn alcoholic with strong moral values, though he is prepared to transgress these beliefs if it means the destruction of his mortal enemy, Caesar. Cato also appears in Thornton Wilder's highly fictionalized Ides of March, where Cato is described by Caesar as one of "four men whom I most respect in Rome" but who "regard me with mortal enmity". Cato also appears as a major character in Robert Harris' Imperium and Lustrum novels, appearing as a heroic guardian of republican virtues, foreseeing Caesar's aggregation of power as perilous for the long-term stability of Rome. Cato is a major and continuing character in the SPQR historical mystery novels by John Maddox Roberts, where he is portrayed as an impressive but rather tedious figure.

In the television series Rome, Cato, played by actor Karl Johnson, is a significant character, although he is shown as somewhat older than his actual age (mid-40s) at the time. In the 2002 miniseries Julius Caesar, Cato as played by Christopher Walken is depicted as much older than he was, seen as a major figure in the senate when Caesar is just a young man, although Caesar was five years older than Cato. Cato was featured in the BBC docudrama Ancient Rome: The Rise and Fall of an Empire.
