= Lex Julia de repetundis =

Law against extortion brought by Julius Caesar in 59 BC

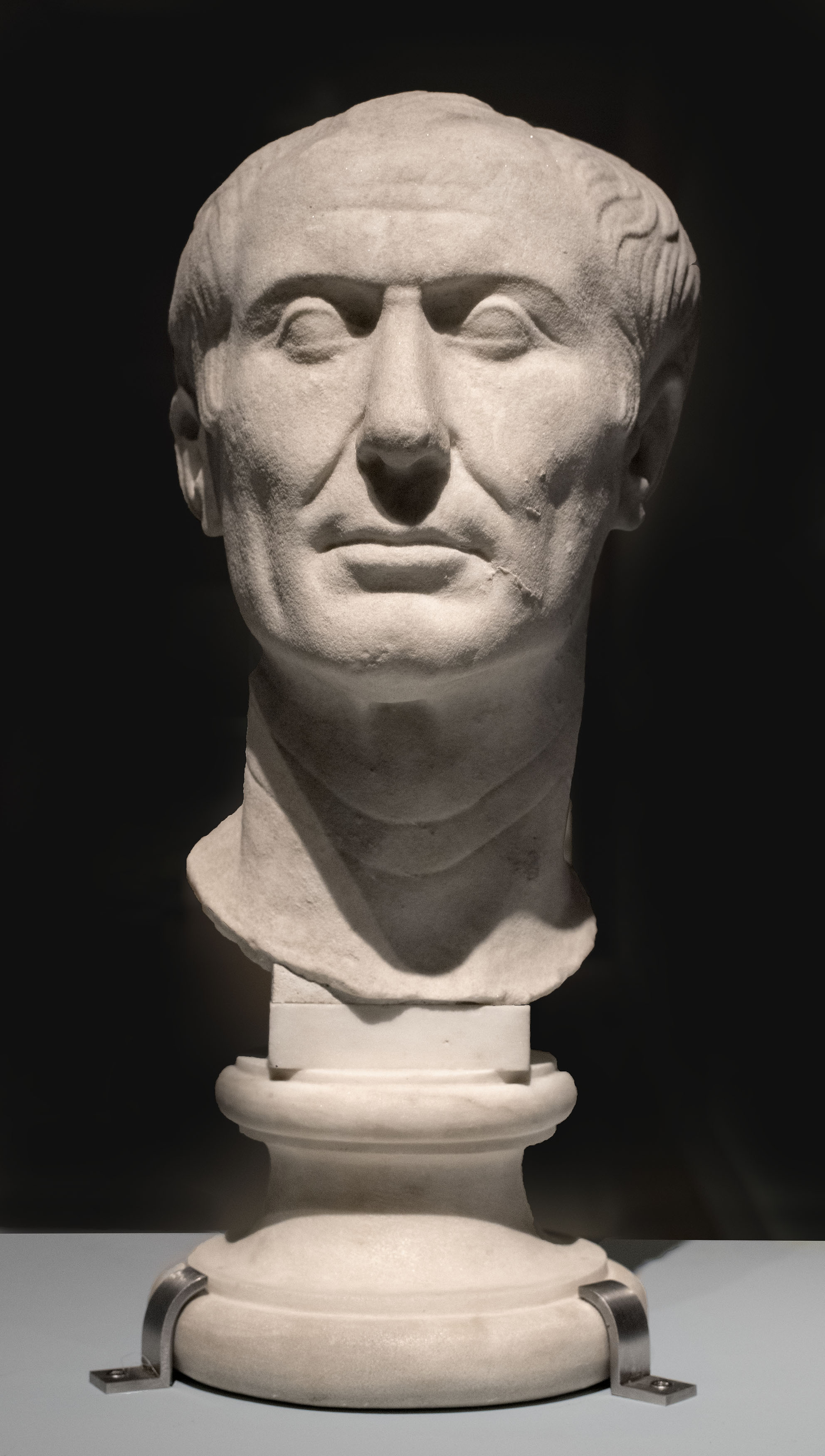
The law was passed by and named for Julius Caesar. This is the Tusculum portrait, the only known depiction of Caesar produced during his lifetime.

The lex Julia de repetundis ("Julian law on corruption") was a foundational corruption law of the late Roman Republic and the Roman Empire. Its provisions covered all magistrates, governors, and the family and employees thereof. Covered persons were prohibited of taking money to make, not make, or influence any official action.

It was passed by Gaius Julius Caesar during his first consulship in 59 BC with the support of the Senate. It continued in force as amended through into the Justinianic era, with fragments and commentaries codified into the Corpus Juris Civilis.

== History ==
The Roman Republic had, since it acquired an empire, struggled with the problem of provincial governors extorting their provincial subjects. By 171 BC provincials could bring complaints against governors to Rome. The first permanent court (Latin: quaestio perpetua) in Rome was established by the lex Calpurnia in 149 specifically to try extortion cases. Available remedies were expanded by Gaius Gracchus' lex Sempronia in 123 BC and later during Sulla's rule.

Gaius Julius Caesar was consul in 59 BC. During that year he had, with the support of his allies in what is misleadingly termed in modern times the First Triumvirate, pursued an aggressive and controversial reform programme. Brought late in his consular year, the lex Julia was one of his least controversial bills. It is sometimes suggested that Caesar, whose reputation for avarice is well known from his pillaging of Spain during his post-praetorian governorship there, brought the bill in Pompey's name. It contained some 200 clauses covering all manner of hitherto semi-illegal practices that republican governors had used to line their own pockets.

Caesar, who had come to political blows repeatedly with Marcus Porcius Cato and allies thereof during his consular year, found their support for the anti-extortion bill. Cato likely saw the bill as a positive for the state and, importantly, legislation brought in good faith for the state rather than for Caesar's own political advancement. Modern scholars have suggested that some of the provisions in the lex Julia were in fact added on Cato's initiative: the clauses protecting the rights of free communities had been an objective of Cato's the previous year.

== Provisions ==
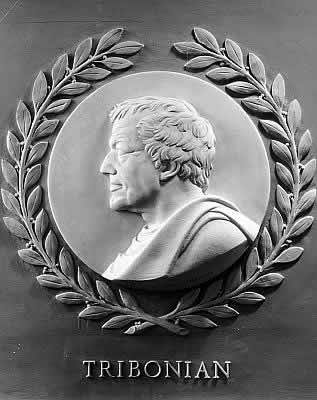
Tribonian was a Byzantine jurist, depicted here in a modern bas relief located in the United States Capitol. He supervised the collation and editing of the Justinianic Corpus Juris Civilis which saw the preservation of fragments of the lex Julia.

Most of the evidence of the lex Julia is preserved by commentaries of Roman jurists; its provisions were still in force as late as the Justinianic Digest. The third century AD jurist Aemilius Macer held that the lex Julia created a general prohibition against taking any object of value to make or not make any official act. Such acts included civil judgements, imprisonments, criminal judgements, sentencing decisions, and decisions on status.

During the republican period, claims repetundae (extortion) were brought before a quaestio perpetua, one of the permanent jury courts in Rome, by private prosecution. One notable and "awkward" exception from the ostensibly comprehensive anti-bribery law were penalties for equestrian jurors taking bribes in Rome: such jurors were legally immune and regularly bribed with enormous sums by defendants. By the imperial period, process under the lex Julia was largely by cognitio extra ordinem with sentences imposed starting at exile. Sentencing enhancements were applied if the illegal action caused someone to die or otherwise be punished.

It applied to all magistrates, persons with official power or administrative duties, legates, and employees thereof. Family members of covered persons also were covered if they engaged in corrupt activities to influence that covered person. People who took a share in bribe proceeds were also liable. Money damages were set for bribery cases in the lex Acilia (123 BC) at double of the bribes paid.

Governors were also prohibited from forcing provincial communities to defer the cost of maintaining Roman troops within their communities. Senators also were prohibited from voting themselves onto putative embassies to the provinces for the actual purpose of conducting private business. The law also prohibited governors from demanding supposedly voluntary gifts from their provincial subjects. The ability for governors to misappropriate plunder won in battle and force repayment of debts by force from "free cities" also was curtailed. The account books of provincial governors also had to be deposited on the close of a governor's term both at Rome and at two cities within the province.

== See also ==
- List of Roman laws

== Bibliography ==
- Drogula, Fred K (2019). Cato the Younger: life and death at the end of the Roman republic. New York: Oxford University Press. ISBN 978-0-19-086902-1. OCLC 1090168108.
- Morstein-Marx, Robert (2021). Julius Caesar and the Roman People. Cambridge University Press. doi:10.1017/9781108943260. ISBN 978-1-108-83784-2. LCCN 2021024626. S2CID 242729962.
- Plescia, Joseph (2001). "Judicial accountability and immunity in Roman law". The American Journal of Legal History. 45 (1): 51–70. doi:10.2307/3185349. ISSN 0002-9319. JSTOR 3185349.
- Richardson, John (1994). "Administration of the empire". In Crook, John; et al. (eds.). The last age of the Roman Republic, 146–43 BC. Cambridge Ancient History. Vol. 9 (2nd ed.). Cambridge University Press. pp. 564–98. ISBN 0-521-85073-8. OCLC 121060.
