= Quintus Minucius Thermus =

Quintus Minucius Thermus may refer to:

- Quintus Minucius Thermus (consul 193 BC)
- Quintus Minucius Thermus (governor of Asia)
