= Antipater of Tyre =

Ancient Greek philosopher

Antipater of Tyre (Ancient Greek: Ἀντίπατρος ὁ Τύριος; fl. 1st century BC) was a Greek Stoic philosopher and a friend of Cato the Younger and Cicero.

== Life ==
Antipater lived after, or was at least younger than, Panaetius. Cicero, in speaking of him, says, that he died "recently at Athens", which must mean shortly before 45 BC. He is mentioned by Strabo as a "famous philosopher" from Tyre. Antipater is said to have befriended Cato when Cato was a young man, and introduced him to Stoic philosophy:

Having gained the intimate acquaintance of Antipater the Tyrian, the Stoic philosopher, he [Cato] devoted himself to the study, above everything, of moral and political doctrine.

== Works ==
Little is known about his writings. From Cicero we can perhaps infer that Antipater, like Panaetius, wrote a work On Duties (Latin: de Officiis):

Antipater of Tyre, a Stoic philosopher who recently died at Athens, claims that two points were overlooked by Panaetius—the care of health and of property.

— Cicero, de Officiis, ii. 86

Diogenes Laërtius refers to another work by him called On the Cosmos (Greek: περὶ κόσμου):

The whole world is a living being, endowed with soul and reason, and having aether for its ruling principle: so says Antipater of Tyre in the eighth book of his treatise On the Cosmos.

— Diogenes Laërtius, vii. 139
