= Athenodoros Cordylion =

Stoic philosopher

Athenodoros Cordylion (or Athenodorus, Ancient Greek: Αθηνόδωρος Κορδυλίων; fl. early-mid 1st century BC) was a Stoic philosopher, born in Tarsus. He was the keeper of the library at Pergamon, where he was known to cut out passages from books on Stoic philosophy if he disagreed with them:

The passages disapproved by the school were expunged from his [Zeno's] works by Athenodorus the Stoic, who was in charge of the Pergamene library; and that afterwards, when Athenodorus was detected and compromised, they were replaced.

— Diogenes Laërtius, vii. 34

In his old age, Athenodorus relocated to Rome, where he lived with Cato the Younger until his death.
