= Silvio Sbricoli =

Italian sculptor (1864–1911)

Silvio Sbricoli (1864–1911) was an Italian sculptor and painter.

He was born in Rome. As a young man he worked for many years in the studio of the French sculptor Prosper d'Épinay. He was active inside and near Rome, producing numerous statues, monuments, and portraits in a Realist style. He completed the monument to Giuseppe Verdi (circa 1904) in Viterbo. He also completed the statue of Papinian (1899) for the Palace of Justice, Rome. At the 1884 Exposition of Fine Arts in Turin, he exhibited two portrait busts in bronze stucco; and at the National Artistic Exposition in Venice of 1887, he sent Un bricconcello. The next year at the Exposition of Bologna, he exhibited a painting titled: Dichi a' mme!
