= Papinian =

Roman jurist (142–212 CE)

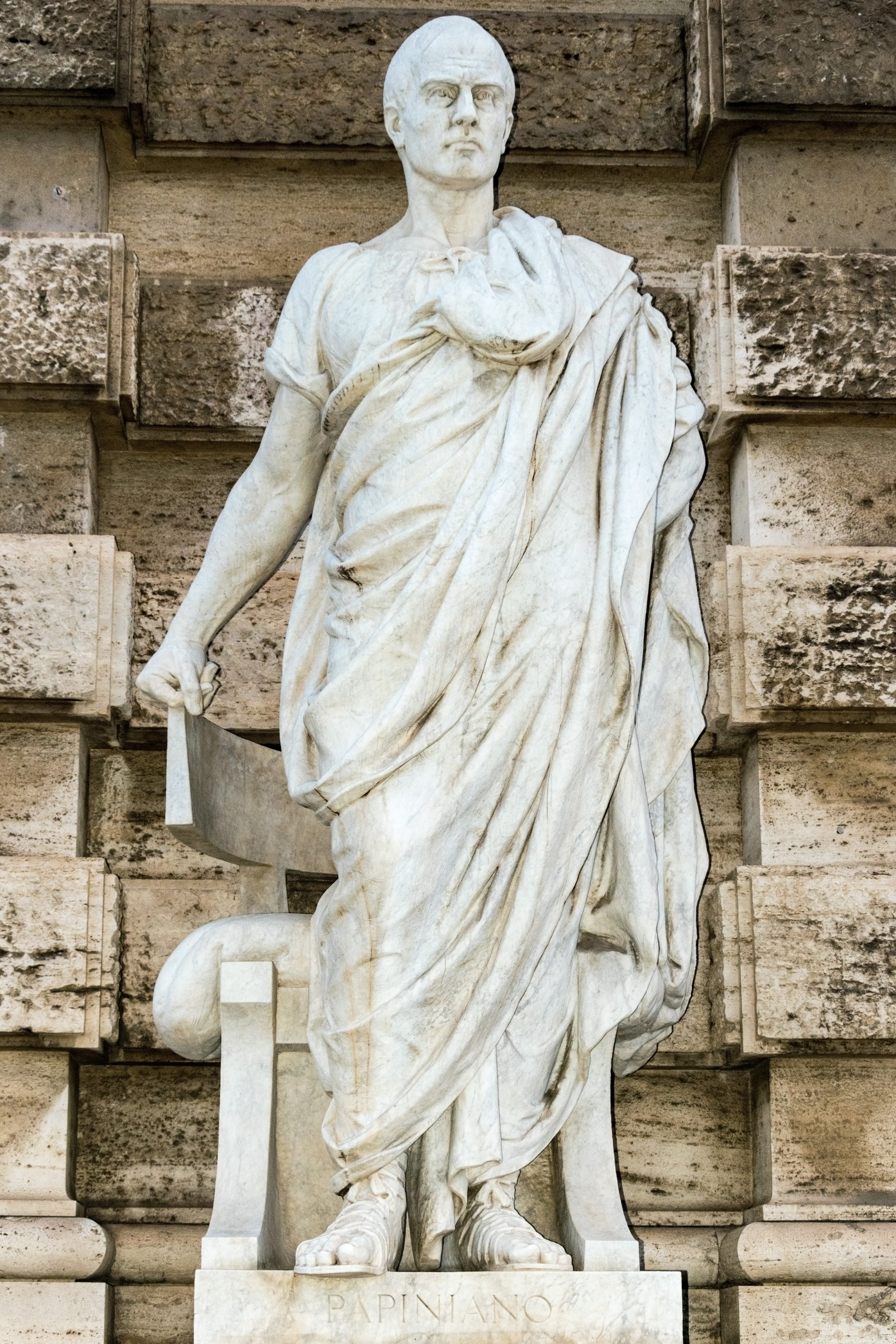
- Statue by Silvio Sbricoli, Palace of Justice of Rome
- Born: Aemilius Paulus Papinianus; 142 CE; Emesa, Roman Syria
- Died: 212 CE (aged 69–70); Rome
- Military career
- Allegiance: Roman Empire
- Service years: 205 CE–212 CE
- Rank: Praetorian prefect
- Unit: Praetorian Guard

Aemilius Papinianus (Latin pronunciation: [ae̯ˈmɪliʊs paːpɪniˈaːnʊs]; Ancient Greek: Αἰμίλιος Παπινιανός; 142 CE–212 CE), simply rendered as Papinian (/pəˈpɪniən/) in English, was a celebrated Roman jurist, magister libellorum, attorney general (advocatus fisci) and, after the death of Gaius Fulvius Plautianus in 205 CE, praetorian prefect.

Papinian was one of the most revered jurists in ancient Rome, as third year law students were given the title "Papinianistae" (meaning "they that are worthy to study Papinian"). In his time, he had been called "the Asylum of Right and Treasurer of the Laws". Along with Gaius, Paulus, Modestinus and Ulpian, he was made one of the five jurists whose recorded views were considered decisive by the Law of Citations of 426 CE; their views would later be considered the only suitable ones to be cited as primary sources for the Codex Theodosianus and the Corpus Juris Civilis, provided that Papinian's views prevailed whenever those of the four other jurists were not congruent. The 16th century French jurist Jacques Cujas wrote that "there was never such a great lawyer before, nor ever will be after him".

== Life ==
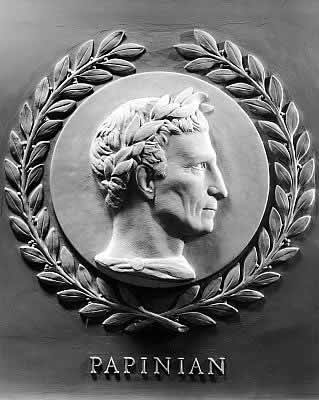
Relief by Laura Gardin Fraser, US House of Representatives chamber

Little is known about Papinian. He was of Syrian origin and birth and a native of Emesa, for he is said to have been a kinsman of Septimius Severus's second wife, Julia Domna, who was a member of the Emesene dynasty.

One source shows him as a follower of the casuistry of Quintus Cervidius Scaevola, another shows him to have been his pupil. A concurring (but dubious) passage in the Augustan History claims that he studied law with Severus under Scaevola.

Papinian was an intimate friend of Emperor Severus and accompanied him to Britain during 207 CE, where he served in "the forum of York" in response to an uprising by Scottish Highlanders. He was at some time made an attorney general (advocatus fisci), master of petitions (requests), magister libellorum, by Severus. He also served as Treasurer and Captain of the Guard for the Emperor. Before the emperor's death, he commended his two sons Caracalla and Geta into the lawyer's charge.

== Death ==
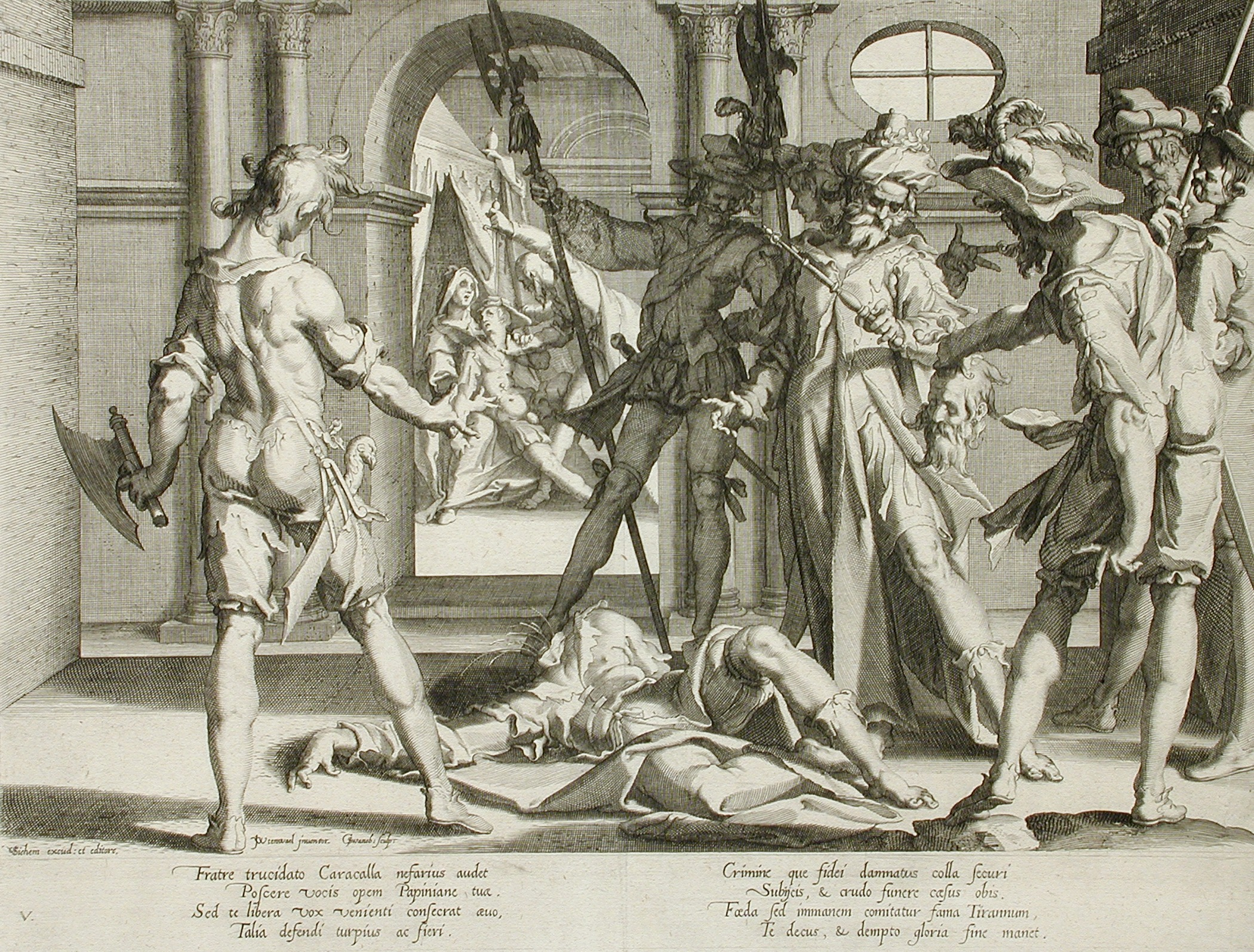
Willem Swanenburgh, after Joachim Anthonisz Wtewael, Beheading of the Roman Judge Papinian, 1606

Sharing in the governorship of the Roman Empire with Geta proved unsatisfactory for Caracalla, who decided at some time to usurp his brother. Papinian, trying to keep peace between the brothers, only proved to encourage the hatred of Caracalla, who ordered Papinian to be beheaded (Spartianus, Caracalla), and his body dragged through the streets of Rome. His death followed the 212 CE fratricide of Geta, amongst the general slaughter of his friends and those perceived associated with him, according to one source estimated as 20,000 persons.

The author of the 1911 Encyclopædia Britannica article states that the details of Papinian's death "are variously related, and have undergone legendary embellishment." Papinian's death was the subject of a play by Andreas Gryphius (1659).

== Works ==
Much of his output has been lost, as what we have is small compared to other jurists such as Ulpian or Paul. The principal works of Papinian include: Quaestiones in 37 books (written before 198 CE); nineteen books of Responsa (written sometime between 204 CE and his death); two books, the Definitiones and De adulteriis, and other works, the shortest of these being Αστυνόμικος (City-Administration) which was a manual on the duties for commissioners of streets and bridges.
