= Quintus Cervidius Scaevola =

2nd century Roman jurist

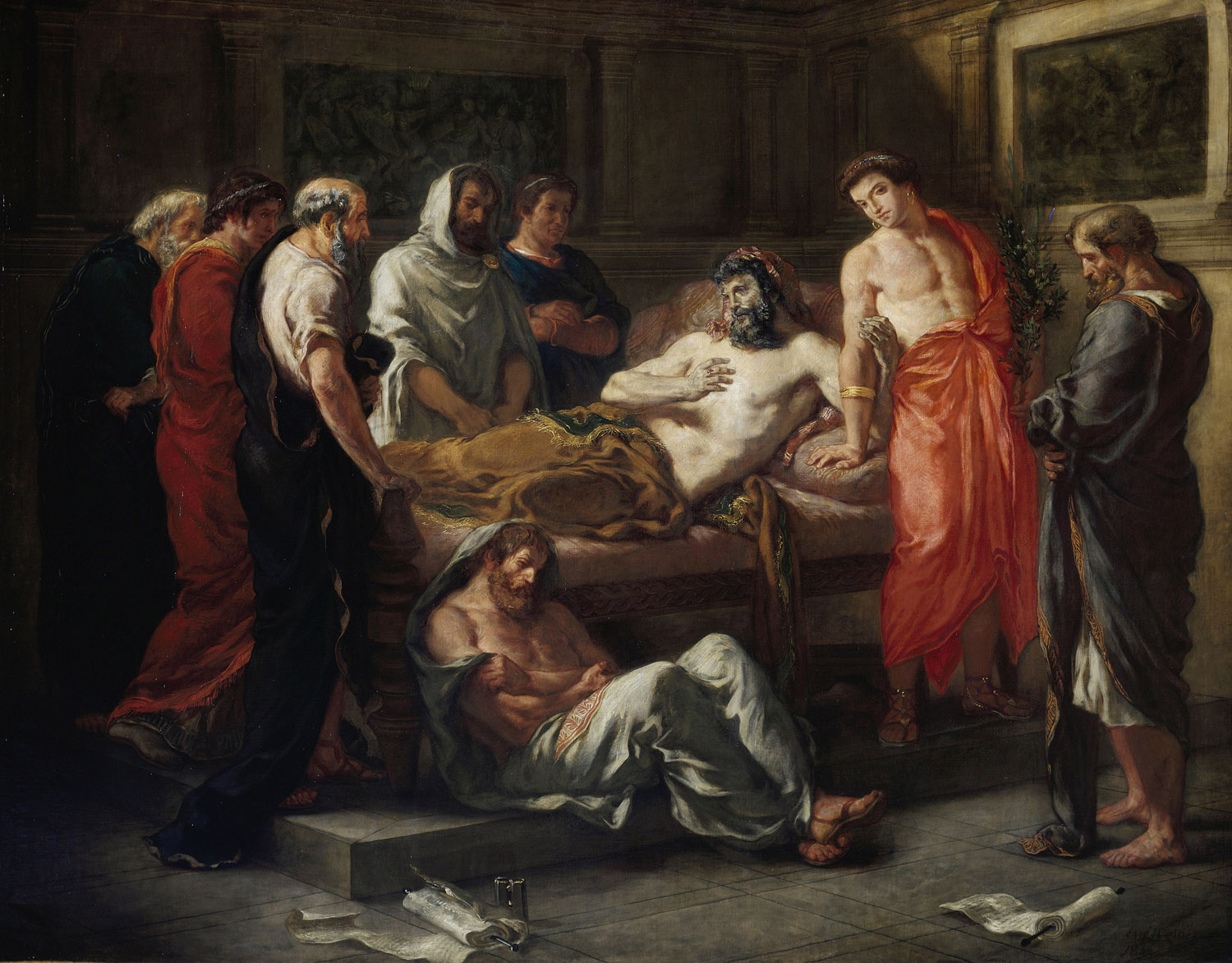
Last Words of the Emperor Marcus Aurelius (Eugène Delacroix); the emperor is depicted surrounded by his advisors

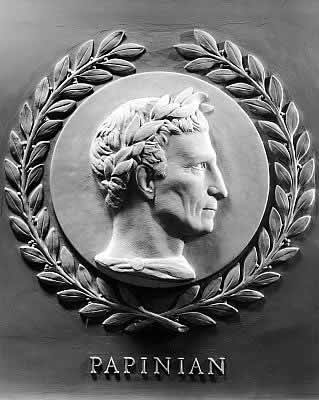
Bas-relief of Papinian (AD 142–212), one of Scaevola's students

Quintus Cervidius Scaevola (fl. c. AD 160–180) was a Roman jurist of the equestrian order. Both the Historia Augusta and the Tabula Banasitana attest that Scaevola was a member of Marcus Aurelius's (r. AD 161–180) consilium or inner circle of advisors. Except that Papinian was his student, little more is known of Scaevola's life.

== Books ==
Scaevola is credited with writing several works, from which excerpts have been preserved in Justinian's Digest:

- Digesta in 40 books; while books 1–29 have ample extracts, there are few from the last 10, which led Paul Jörs to suspect that part of Scaevola's Digesta had been lost by the sixth century.
- Quaestiones in 6 books.
- Responsa in 20 books.
- Quaestiones publice tractatae
- Regulae in 4 books
