= Jean-Baptiste Roman =

French sculptor

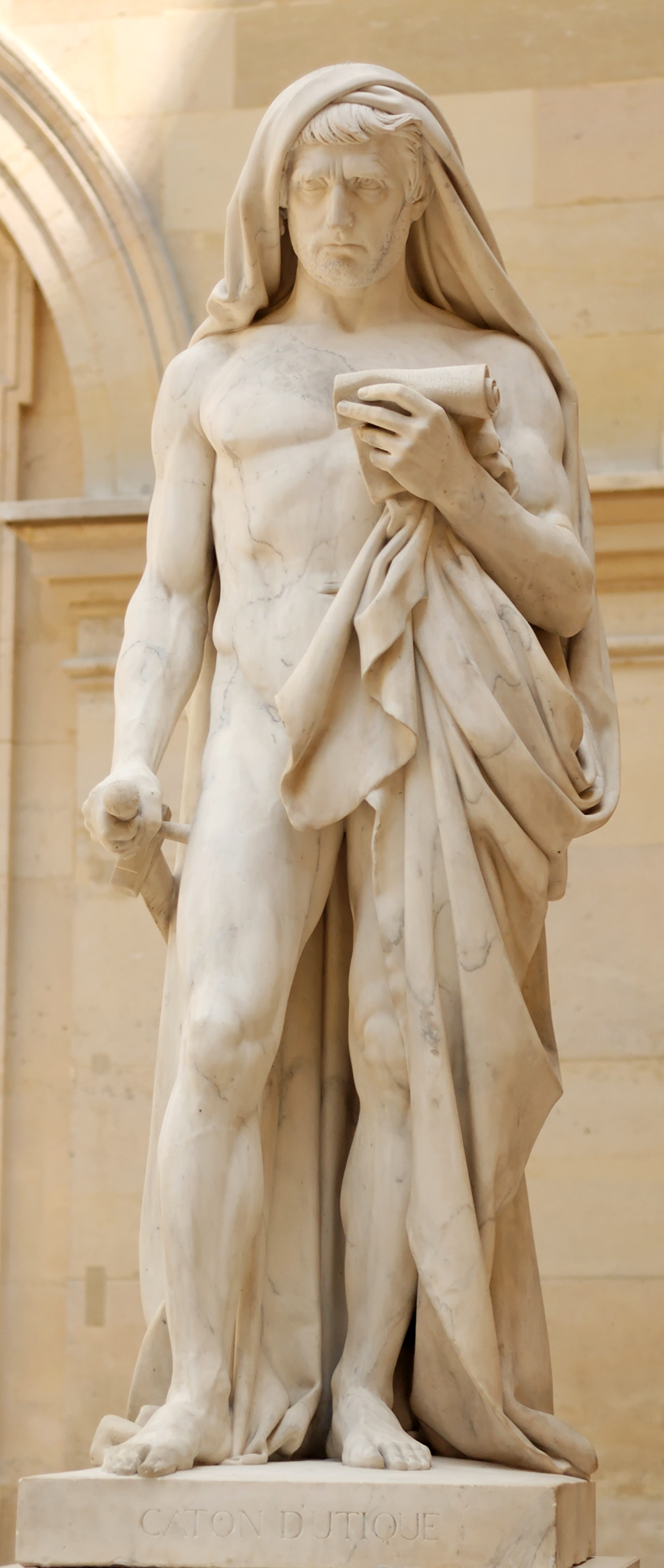
Jean-Baptiste Roman's Cato of Utica Reading the Phaedo before Committing Himself to Death (1832)

Jean-Baptiste Roman (31 October 1792 – 13 February 1835) was a French sculptor. He was born and died in Paris. Among his works is a sculpture on the death of Cato the Younger, a theme that became popular along with revolutionary sentiment. It depicts Cato reading the Phaedo of Plato, on the death of Socrates, heroically nude as he contemplates his own death. The piece was commissioned in 1832 for the Louvre, but was finished by François Rude after his friend's death.

Roman was an instructor in sculpture at the École des beaux-arts; his vacant place was filled in 1835, by Louis-Messidor Lebon Petitot, full professeur from 1845 to 1862.

== List of works ==
- L'Innocence (1822), a nude girl holding a lizard, an emblem of innocence.
- Le peintre Girodet (1827), a portrait bust of Anne-Louis Girodet de Roussy-Trioson (1767–1824)
- Nisus et Euryale (1827)
- Caton d'Utique lisant le Phédon avant de se donner la mort (1832) with François Rude
