= Cato the Younger =

Roman politician and Stoic (95–46 BC)

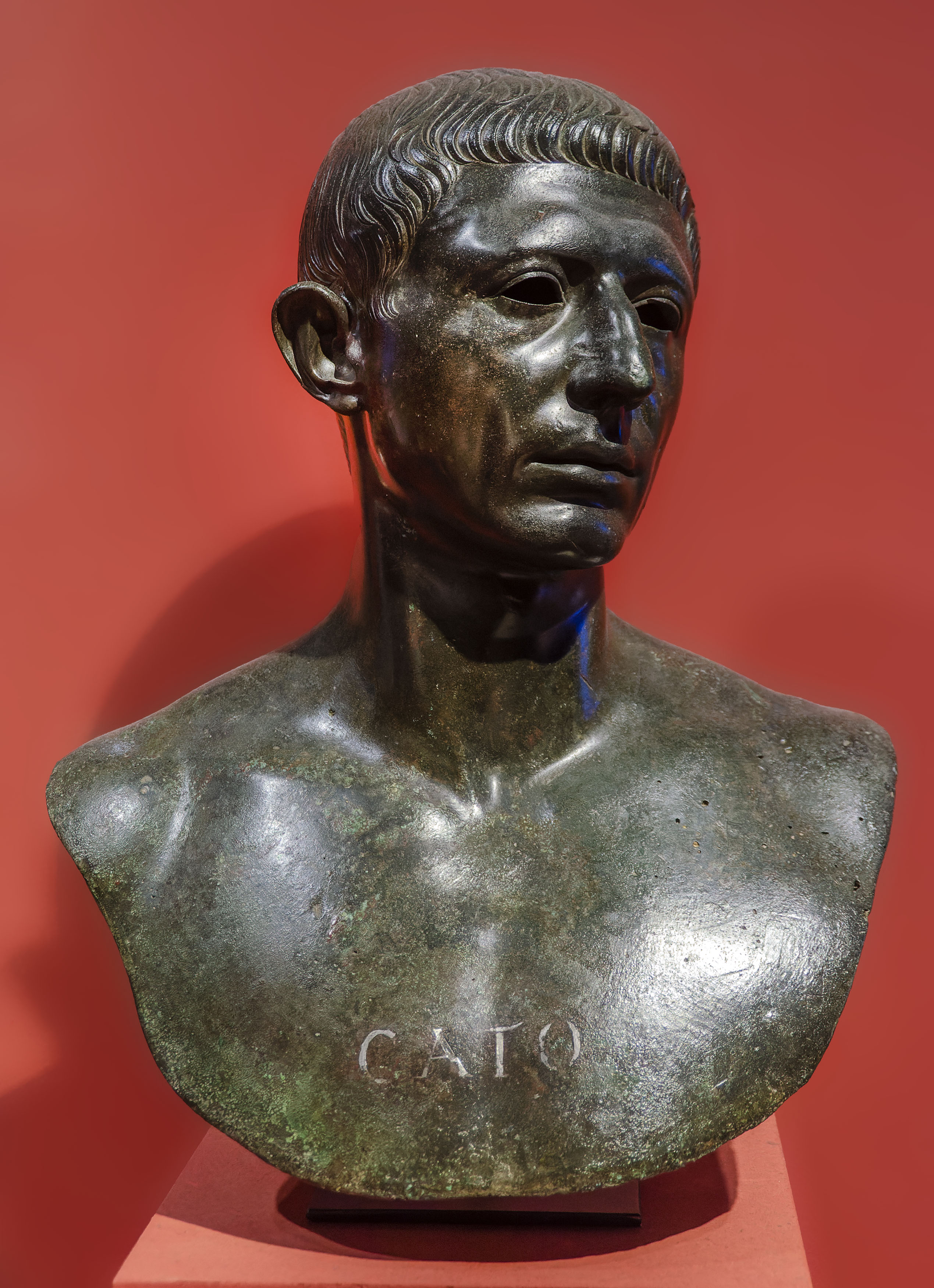
- Inscribed bronze bust from Volubilis, Morocco
- Born: 95 BC; Roman Republic
- Died: April 46 BC (aged 49); Utica, Africa, Roman Republic
- Cause of death: Suicide
- Occupation: Politician
- Years active: 67–46 BC
- Known for: Opposition to Julius Caesar
- Office: Military tribune (67 BC); Quaestor (64 BC); Plebeian tribune (62 BC); Praetor (54 BC)
- Spouses: Atilia; Marcia; prohibition jurors
- Children: Marcus Porcius Cato; Porcia
- Parents: Marcus Porcius Cato (father); Livia (mother)
- Relatives: Brutus (nephew); Servilia (half-sister)
- Family: gens Porcia
- Military career
- Allegiance: Roman Republic (72–49 BC); Pompey (49–46 BC)
- Rank: Praetor
- Wars: Third Servile War; Second Catilinarian Conspiracy; Caesar's Civil War †

Marcus Porcius Cato Uticensis ("of Utica"; /ˈkeɪtoʊ/ KAY-toe; 95 BC – April 46 BC), also known as Cato the Younger (Latin: Cato Minor), was an influential conservative Roman senator during the late Republic. A staunch advocate for liberty and the preservation of the Republic's principles, he dedicated himself to protecting the traditional Roman values he believed were in decline. A noted orator and a follower of Stoicism, his scrupulous honesty and professed respect for tradition gave him a political following which he mobilised against powerful generals of his day, including Julius Caesar and Pompey.

Before Caesar's civil war, Cato served in a number of political offices. During his urban quaestorship in 63 BC, he was praised for his honesty and incorruptibility in running Rome's finances. He passed laws during his plebeian tribunate in 62 BC to expand the grain dole and force generals to give up their armies and commands before standing in elections. He also frustrated Pompey's ambitions by opposing a bill brought by Pompey's allies to transfer the military command to Pompey against the Catilinarian conspirators. He opposed, with varying success, Caesar's legislative programme during Caesar's first consulship in 59 BC. Leaving for Cyprus the next year, he was praised for his honest administration and after his return was elected as praetor for 54 BC.

He supported Pompey's sole consulship in 52 BC as a practical matter and to draw Pompey from his alliance with Caesar. In this, he was successful. He and his political allies advocated a policy of confrontation and brinkmanship with Caesar; though it seemed that Cato never advocated for actual civil war, this policy greatly contributed to the start of civil war in January 49 BC. During the civil war, he joined Pompey and tried to minimise the deaths of his fellow citizens. But after Pompey's defeat and his own cause's defeat by Caesar in Africa, he chose to take his own life rather than accept what he saw as Caesar's tyrannical pardon, turning himself into a martyr for and a symbol of the Republic.

His political influence was rooted in his moralist principles and his embodiment of Roman traditions that appealed to both senators and the innately conservative Roman voter. He was criticised by contemporaries and by modern historians for being too uncompromising in obstructing Caesar and other powerful generals. Those tactics and their success led to the creation of the First Triumvirate and the outbreak of civil war. The epithet "the Younger" distinguishes him from his great-grandfather, Cato the Elder, who was viewed by ancient Romans in similar terms as embodying tradition and propriety.

== Biography ==
=== Early life ===
Cato was born in 95 BC, the son of his homonymous father and Livia. He was descended from Cato the Elder – this Cato's great-grandfather – who was a novus homo ("new man"), that is, the first of the family to be elected to the consulship. The elder Cato was famed for his austerity and traditional Roman values, which was affected for political reasons and meant to embellish his reputation as "the foremost representative of the mos maiorum".

He and his sister Porcia were orphaned, probably before Cato was four years old, and the children were taken in by their maternal uncle, Marcus Livius Drusus. After Drusus' death and the resulting start of the Social War in 91 BC, Cato and his sister probably came into the household of his mother's older brother, Mamercus Aemilius Lepidus Livianus. Moving in with Cato and his sister were a half-brother and two half-sisters from his mother Livia's first marriage to Quintus Servilius Caepio. Cato was especially close to his half-brother, Gnaeus Servilius Caepio, and his elder half-sister, Servilia, who would later marry Marcus Junius Brutus (the father of the tyrannicide) and become the mistress of Julius Caesar.

Stories of Cato's early childhood are broadly unreliable and told mainly to suggest that Cato's character as an adult had been established in childhood. They include claims that Cato was a poor student, a dubious tale that Quintus Poppaedius Silo – one of the Italian leaders during the Social War – once threatened to hang Cato out of a window unless he voiced support for Italian citizenship (Cato supposedly remained silent), and a claim that Cato asked his tutor for a sword with which to assassinate Sulla during the proscriptions.

Around the age of 16, Cato was inducted into the quindecimviri sacris faciundis, the board of priests in charge of consulting and interpreting the Sibylline Oracles. This was a prestigious honour, for which he was likely selected on the initiative of his uncle Mamercus Lepidus, and it put Cato into the centre of the senatorial elite.

=== Political development ===
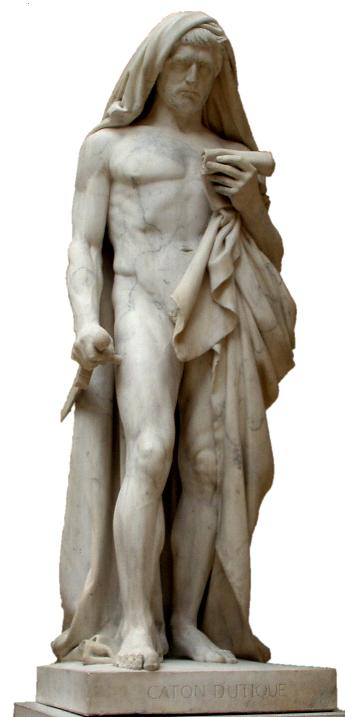
Statue of Cato the Younger in the Louvre Museum. He is about to kill himself while reading the Phaedo, a dialogue of Plato which describes the death of Socrates. The statue was begun by Jean-Baptiste Roman (Paris, 1792–1835) using white Carrara marble. It was finished by François Rude (Dijon, 1784 – Paris, 1855).

Shortly after his induction into the quindecimviri, he received his inheritance, which immediately made him a wealthy citizen (though modest among the elite). Plutarch reports around this time, he also began to study Stoicism under the philosopher Antipater of Tyre, Epicureanism under a Philostratus, and Peripatetism under a certain Demetrius.

==== Embodying the mos maiorum ====
He also started to adopt a pattern of ostentatious public antiquarianism. To that end, he adopted an austere lifestyle where he refused to travel long distances on horseback (preferring to walk), travelled the city barefoot, and wore only a toga without a tunic. His sartorial choices were modelled on statues of Rome's legendary founders and heroes, who were depicted wearing togas alone, rather than any philosophical inclinations. These choices were deliberate and political:

He was raised in a wealthy aristocratic house that is not known to have departed from mainstream contemporary culture... He made a deliberate decision to break with the norms of his peers... faced [with] daunting challenges in his intended political career[,] he leveraged his strongest asset – his great-grandfather's reputation as a champion of tradition – to enhance his own status.

By adopting the archaic style of dress found on statues of Rome's ancient heroes, he sought to present himself as the ideal of Roman virtue. This presentation of tradition was sure to appeal to the conservative senators... but there was also a strong popular appeal in Cato's unique behaviour.

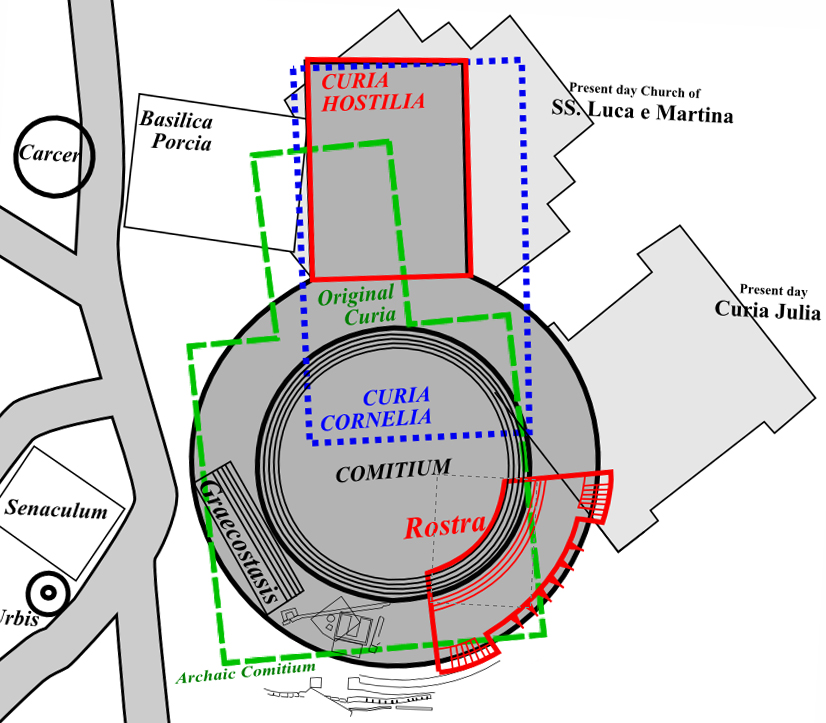
The basilica Porcia was a small building to the left of the curia Hostilia (in red) in the Roman Forum raised by Cato's great-grandfather. It was Rome's first basilica; it burnt down in 52 BC.

His first appearance on the public stage was to oppose changes to the Basilica Porcia, a public building commissioned by his great-grandfather Cato the Elder during his term as censor in 184 BC. The plebeian tribunes proposed moving a column that impeded their view of the Forum. Cato may have been expected to defend the monument – such monuments extolled the families of those who built them – but the column may not have actually been part of the Basilica. Regardless, Cato used the opportunity to enter public life with an appearance defending his family's honour and reputation, showing his pietas, and connecting himself to his famous ancestor.

==== Marriages and alliances ====
Cato's first marriage was early in his twenties. He was first betrothed to his cousin Aemilia Lepida (a daughter of Mamercus Lepidus). The reasons were unclear: because of his close relations to Mamercus Lepidus, the match would not have been very useful politically in building new alliances; he may have been motivated by love or by the large size of the dowry. Aemilia Lepida had previously been betrothed to Quintus Caecilius Metellus Pius Scipio Nasica, but Scipio broke off the match, after which Cato was betrothed. However, some time later, Scipio changed his mind and Lepidus evidently decided that a match with Scipio was more desirable. The two were married shortly after. Cato was angry and threatened a lawsuit against his uncle to enforce the engagement, but was dissuaded by his friends.

He instead married Atilia, the daughter of an Atilius Serranus (the specific identity is unknown). While the gens Atilia had consular ancestors, it had not been successful in reaching the consulship after the end of the second century BC. By her, he later had a son, Marcus Porcius Cato, and a daughter, Porcia. Around this time he also secured an excellent marriage for his sister in Lucius Domitius Ahenobarbus. His half-sisters' very favourable matches helped develop a strong network of political allies.

==== Military service ====
In 72 BC, Cato volunteered to fight in the war against Spartacus, presumably to support his half-brother Caepio, who was serving as a military tribune in the consular army of Lucius Gellius. Although the army was defeated twice in battle, Cato's valour was recognised. Although Gellius recommended Cato for awards, he publicly declined them and indicated that he thought Gellius' standards for military achievement too low; news of this implicit rebuke made its way back to Rome and buttressed Cato's reputation.

A few years later, in 67 BC, he stood for the military tribunate. After winning election, he was dispatched to Macedonia under propraetor Marcus Rubrius, where he earned the respect of the soldiers by sharing their burdens and treating them justly. He insisted on walking, refusing to ride a horse. Over a winter, he travelled to Pergamum and became the patron of a Greek Stoic philosopher named Athenodorus who, contradicting Cato the Elder's disdain for Greek philosophers, accompanied Cato back to Rome.

During his service in Macedonia, he received the news that his beloved half-brother Caepio was ill and dying in Thrace. He immediately went to see him but was unable to arrive before his brother's death. Cato was overwhelmed by grief and, ignoring Stoic principles of apatheia (living without passions), he spared no expense to organise lavish funeral ceremonies. After the end of his military commission, he travelled through Asia Minor and through Galatia. Before returning to Rome, he also visited Pompey the Great, who was then supervising the final stages of the Third Mithridatic War. Cato, according to Plutarch, received an exaggerated and deferential welcome from the proconsul, which some scholars doubt actually occurred.

=== Entry to politics ===
Cato returned to Rome in early 65 BC and intended to stand for the quaestorship later that year. He spent substantial time familiarising himself with the laws related to the office – largely on administration of state finances both in Rome and in the provinces – and may have been angling to engage in reforms of state treasury operations. He was easily elected and took office on 5 December 65 BC.

Around this time, Lucullus – one of the wealthiest men in Rome and long-time commander of troops against Mithridates VI Eupator in the Third Mithridatic War – approached him about marrying Cato's younger half-sister Servilia. This was likely part of Lucullus' attempt to build alliances to support his bid for a triumph against Mithridates, which had been stymied by Pompey's supporters, who wanted to permit Pompey (then in Asia) to return and take all the credit. Cato agreed and after the marriage, during his quaestorship, he helped Lucullus (by this point in the second or third year of campaigning for a triumph) in browbeating his opponents into eventually granting a triumph in 63 BC.

==== Quaestorship (64 BC) ====
Cato was assigned to the state treasury (the aerarium, literally 'place for bronze') in Rome as one of the urban quaestors. The complexity of Roman financial law and the treasury's record-keeping had caused the relatively junior Roman aristocrats to delegate much of the work to the treasury staff, resulting in widespread corruption. Cato started his term by prosecuting and sacking a number of the clerks; even after one clerk was acquitted after intervention from one of the censors, Cato refused to rehire him.

He also started the process of collecting on long-standing state debts and made prompt payments to state creditors. In doing so, he cooperated with Julius Caesar, who had then just completed a term as curule aedile and was acting as a prosecutor in court, in challenging the legal immunity and payments given to men who had received bounties for killings during the Sullan proscriptions. He also changed procedures to ensure that the treasury archives rejected fraudulent documents.

On his last day in the aerarium, Plutarch reports that he discovered that his old friend and colleague in the urban quaestorship, Marcus Claudius Marcellus, was entering fraudulent records; Cato apparently stormed back to erase them before the end of his term. He also spent an enormous amount of money – some five talents, about four per cent of his inheritance – to make copies of all the treasury archives from Sulla to his own day so that he could keep them on hand.

Cato gained an exemplary reputation for honesty in administering the aerarium. According to Plutarch's biography, he "taught men that a city can be rich without treating its citizens unjustly" and "brought the quaestorship into greater esteem than the senate, so that everybody thought and said that Cato had given the quaestorship the dignity of the consulship".

==== Tribunate (62 BC) ====
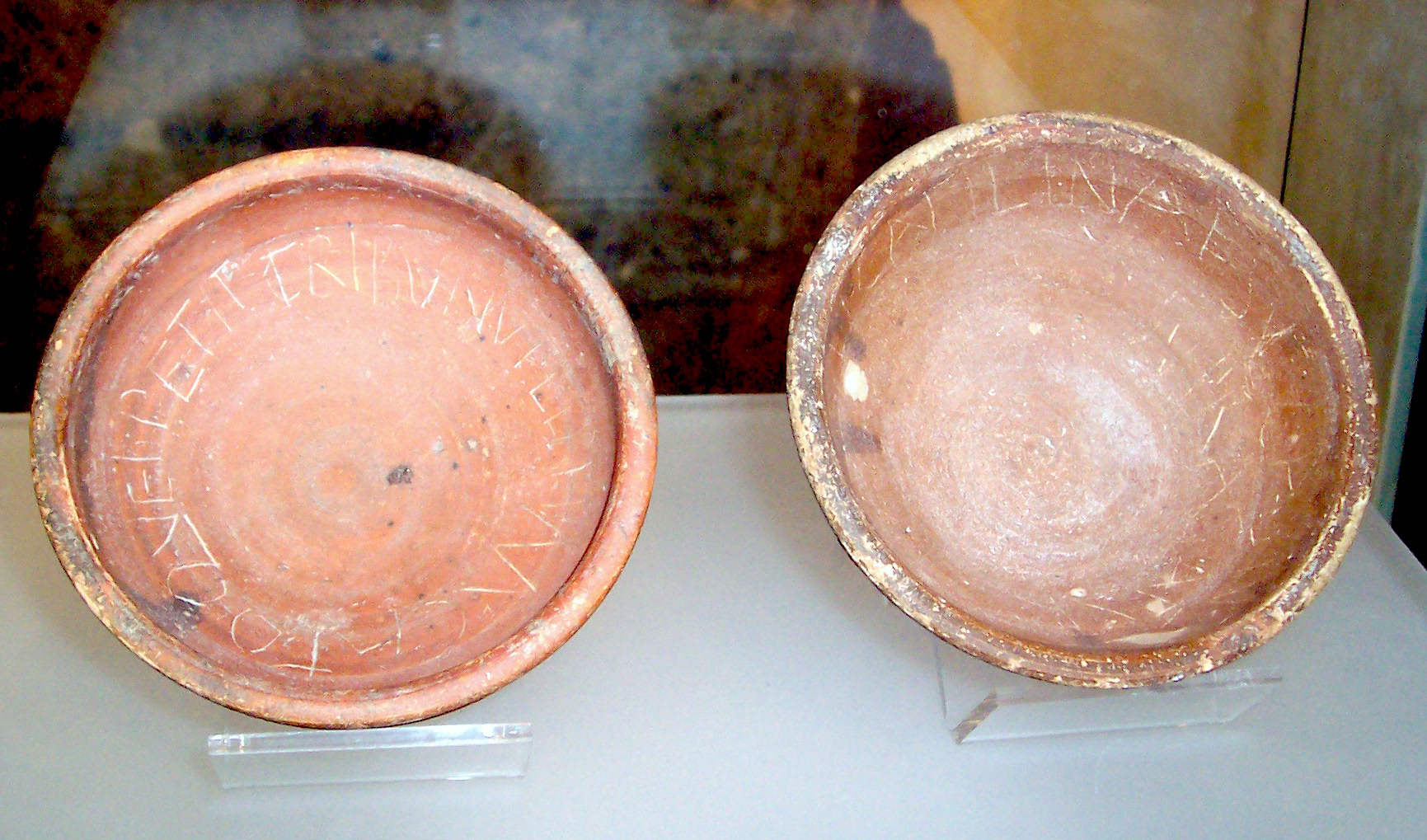
Propaganda cup of Cato (the cup to the left, the one to the right being dedicated to Catiline), for his canvass for the plebeian tribunate of 62 BC. These cups, filled with food or drinks, were distributed in the streets to the people, and bore an inscription supporting the candidate to the election.

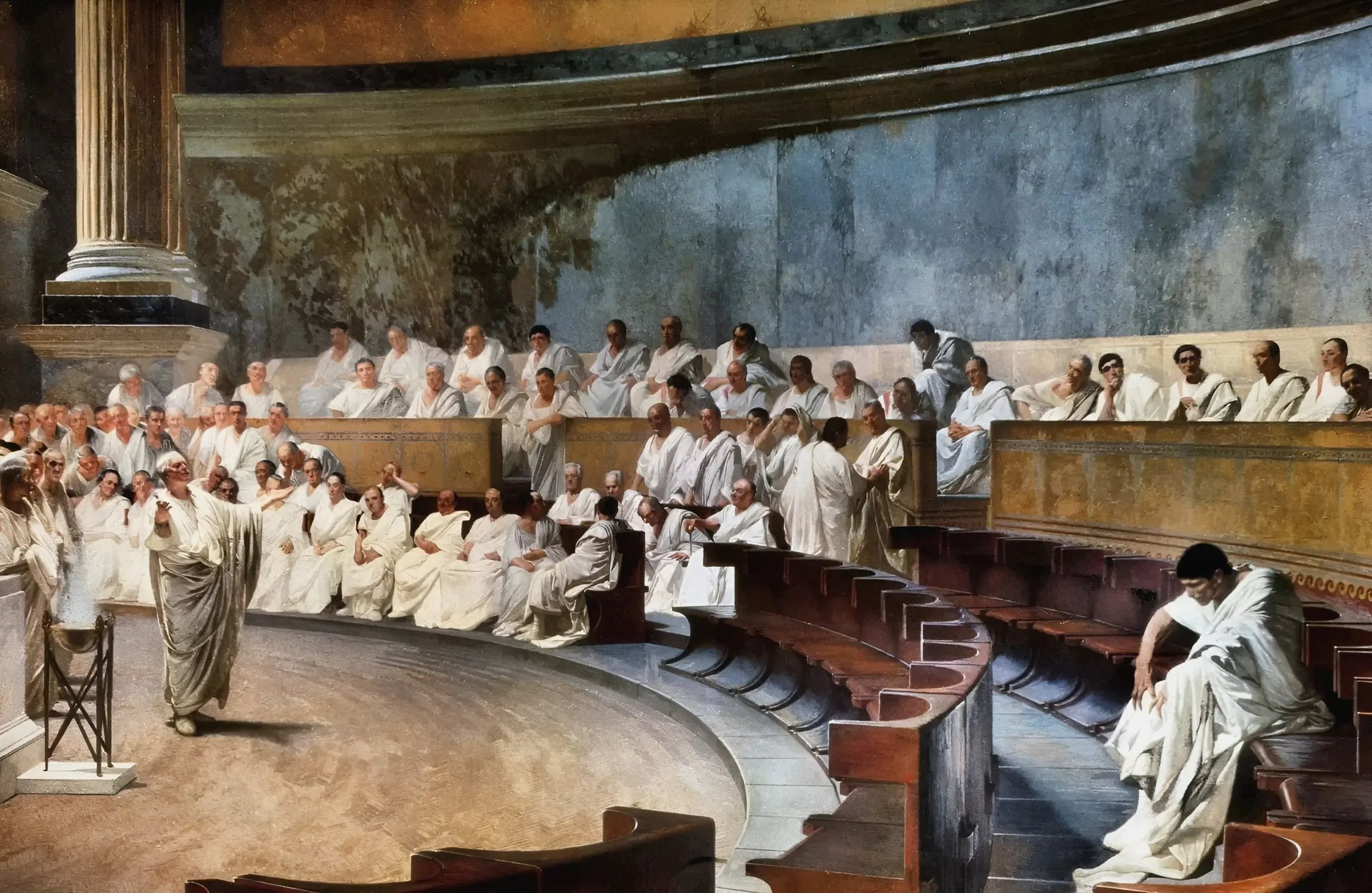
An 1889 depiction by Cesare Maccari of Cicero, then consul, speaking against Catiline, at right.

In 63 BC, Cato stood for the plebeian tribunate of 62 BC. After his election but before his term started in December, he opposed granting additional honours to Pompey, engaged in an unsuccessful prosecution of Lucius Licinius Murena, and took part in a famous debate on the Catilinarian conspiracy.

===== Catilinarian conspiracy =====
Lucius Sergius Catilina, a noble patrician, led a rebellion against the state, raising an army in Etruria. Upon discovery of an associated plot against the lives of the consuls and other magistrates in Rome, Cicero arrested the conspirators within the city and proposed executing them without trial, a violation of citizen rights to appeal. While Cicero could have done this on his own authority (augmented by a senatus consultum ultimum), he convened the senate and put the matter before it, almost certainly to diffuse responsibility. The matter of killing the conspirators was a novel one: while the use of deadly force against citizens under arms was generally accepted, summarily executing prisoners was not.

Cato's brother-in-law, Decimus Junius Silanus, who was one of the consuls-elect, spoke first in favour of death, as did the rest of the former consuls. But Julius Caesar, then praetor-elect, countered with a proposal to imprison the conspirators, which started to gain the support of the house. Cato spoke two or three speeches after Caesar as tribune-elect. According to Sallust, among other things he argued that the senate was being too soft against enemies of the state, that it was folly to await the ultimate test of the conspirators' guilt – the overthrow of the state – because the very proof of their guilt would make it impossible to enforce the laws, and that precedent and religious scruples demanded severe action. In Sallust's depiction, both Cato and Caesar make appeals to precedent and mos maiorum: Caesar calls executing the subdued conspirators "a new type of punishment" and attempted to draw Cato into contradicting his great-grandfather's lenient stance on the Rhodians after the Third Macedonian War; Cato viewed executing traitors as consistent with ancient Roman tradition. While Caesar's speech – due to the fact he was praetor-elect and would soon assume a presidency of one of the permanent courts – seemed to imply he would as a judge support a prosecution for murder, Cato's counter-arguments convinced the senators to act decisively.

Cato and his political allies also saw in the Catilinarian crisis an opportunity to ruin Caesar's career, if not have him killed, by falsely incriminating him in it. The famous story of Cato's misinterpreting a love letter from Servilia (Cato's half-sister and wife of consul-elect Silanus) to Caesar as incriminating evidence comes from this episode; it may, if historical, show how suspicious Cato was of Caesar's motives. The source of the enmity was both political and personal: historians speculate various reasons, from political opposition to envy of Caesar's social and political success (by this time he had already been elected pontifex maximus, beating out a family ally) to retaliation for malicious rumours of Caesar's having been Cato's nephew's father or that Caesar was purchasing sexual favours from Servilia's daughter. At the same time, it is easy to see contemporary parallels between Caesar and Catiline: Caesar had likely supported Catiline's bids for the consulship; Caesar, like Catiline, was buried under massive debts; Caesar too hailed from an ancient patrician clan that had fallen on hard times; and Caesar too would have been forced into exile or bankrupt obscurity if he were to fail in his political career.

===== As tribune =====
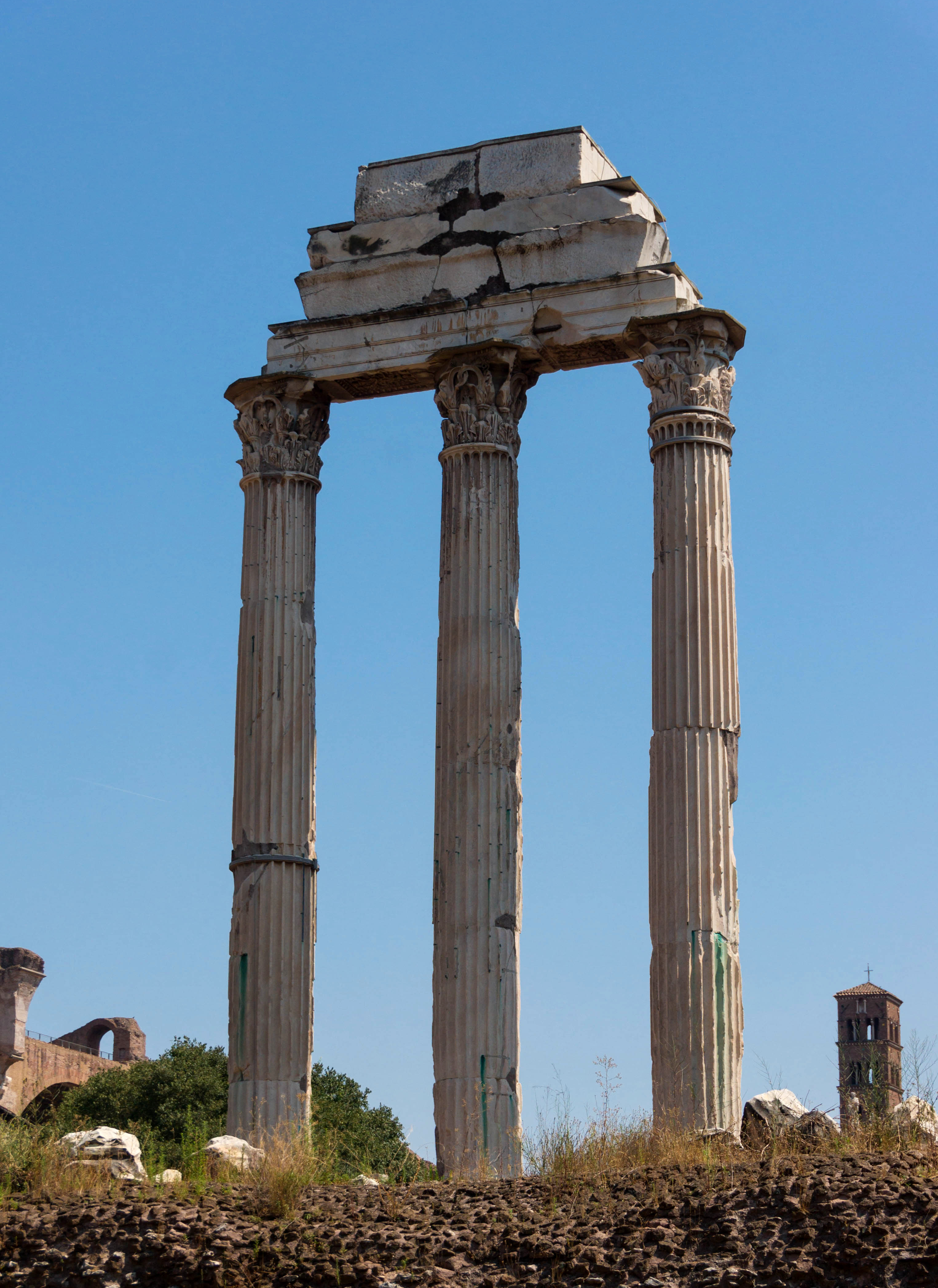
Ruins of the Temple of Castor and Pollux in the Roman Forum. The ruins visible today date to the time of Tiberius.

Cato's first action on entering his tribunate in December 63 BC was to propose a law expanding the grain dole. He brought the bill with the support of the senate late in the year, according to Plutarch, to calm discontent in the city and strengthen the senate's political position. The law more than doubled the number of people receiving subsidised grain, placed a considerable burden on the republic's finances, and possibly made Cato one of the most generous politicians in the history of the grain dole. His grain bill also showed that the lex frumentaria was not a policy advocated only by the so-called "populares", but rather, a goal of multiple political groupings or factions.

One of the other tribunes of the plebs, Metellus Nepos, proposed two bills to grant Pompey additional honours. The first would transfer command of the (nearly completed) campaign against Catiline in northern Italy to Pompey. The second would have allowed Pompey to stand in absentia for the consulship of 61 BC and to lead troops into the pomerium (the sacred boundary of the city). Cato strongly opposed both. When Nepos initially presented the bill, Cato tried to talk him down as a friend but was unsuccessful, returning to invective after Nepos refused. The senate, at Cato's urging, voted down the bills; Nepos moved to bring them before the popular assemblies regardless.

Nepos, along with his ally Caesar, convened the assembly at the Forum before the Temple of Castor and Pollux. Cato and one of his allies, another tribune named Quintus Minucius Thermus, forced their way to the front and Cato then sat between Nepos and Caesar. When Nepos directed the bill to be read, he vetoed it; when Nepos started to read it himself, Cato snatched the draft from his hands; when Nepos started to recite it from memory, Thermus put his hand over Nepos' mouth to stop him from speaking. A fight accordingly broke out in the Forum. In response to the violence, the senate passed a senatus consultum ultimum; Nepos fled Rome to Pompey in the east and Caesar backed down. Suetonius and Plutarch then assert that Nepos, Caesar, or both were removed from their offices; modern scholars do not believe these assertions, as the senate during the republic had no such powers. More contemporaneous sources imply that the senate may have moved to ratify Nepos' departure from the city (tribunes were legally forbidden from leaving the city), although Cato likely objected to this.

Later, Cato, with another fellow tribune named Lucius Marius, passed a law establishing penalties for military commanders who misrepresented the number of enemies or Roman soldiers killed in battles and required commanders to swear as to the accuracy of reported numbers when returning from campaign. The law may have been aimed at Caesar, who would take up in the following year a governorship in Spain, where he would have opportunities to campaign against the Spanish tribes. Cato may also have been involved in the passage of a law requiring candidates at elections to make their official declarations of candidacy in person before an official within the city; such a law precluded a general from holding a military command and standing for office, as entering the pomerium vitiated promagisterial imperium (military command authority). This law may have been aimed at Pompey, who was thought to desire another consulship on his return, or Caesar, to force him to choose between the consulship and military glory.

Near the end of 62 BC, a scandal occurred involving Publius Clodius Pulcher's sacrilegious intrusion into secret rites to Bona Dea. When Clodius was acquitted on charges of sacrilege, apparently due to jury tampering via bribery, Cato moved to correct a loophole in the law. While the lex Aurelia in 70 BC had distributed the jury pool between senators, equestrians, and the tribuni aerarii, the provisions of then-existing laws prohibiting jurors from taking bribes applied only to senators, meaning that bribing the non-senatorial jurors was legal. Cato's push against bribery was opposed by some of his normal allies, such as Cicero, who believed that it undermined senatorial government in alienating the equestrians, and after opposition was eventually dropped.

==== Senatorial leadership ====
Cato was fortunate to emerge into politics when much of the senate was devoid of senior consular leadership. The previous Social War, followed by Sulla's civil war and then the proscriptions, had destroyed a great number of senatorial families. Because of the great bloodletting of previous decades and a growing trend toward semi-retirement rather than active political life after leaving office, by 65 BC, the number of active senior leaders – consulares, that is, former consuls – in the senate had fallen to just nine. Cato's pro-senatorial beliefs and oratorical skills positioned him in taking an active role in leading more conservative senators:

Since the optimates were not a political party, Cato was not joining a specific group of senators linked by a particular social or political outlook, but was claiming a prominent place among those who championed the traditional conduct of politics and the senate's claim to lead the state.

Moreover, his archaic mannerisms also helped him gain influence among the senators and the people. According to Fred Drogula, a classicist, by making "himself into a living example of the old-fashioned Roman... [he] tapped into the deep vein of patriotism and conservatism that ran through the blood of every Roman citizen... disagreeing with [Cato] seemed to be a rejection of Roman tradition and therefore of Rome itself". His antiquarianism and birth to a family that had produced consuls more than a century into the past also helped win prestige among the senatorial elite.

For Fred Drogula, Cato's posturing as "the voice of the ancestors enabled him to push or shame others into agreeing with his opinions", which also helped to make up for his meagre financial resources in an expensive political environment where large bribes paid to voters was a normal part of campaigning. His principled stands also found themselves well taken in a senate which sought to portray itself as morally upright. It, however, made him a difficult ally or potential ally: he would accept few deviations from what he saw as traditional Roman principles.

By the end of his tribunate, he was remarkably popular among the nobility, especially for such a junior senator with no claims to military victory. He also was instrumental in uniting the senate, even at this earlier stage in his career, against Caesar; his success in his anti-Caesarian politics, however, forced Caesar to adopt more aggressive popularis tactics and eventually form his alliance with Pompey and Crassus. In the years after his tribunate, many of the other leading conservative senators died or retired. Cato then assumed a loose leadership of the more conservative wing of senators, further bolstering his influence.

=== Before the civil war ===
After his tribunate, Caesar left for Spain and Pompey returned to Rome in February 61 BC. Pompey divorced his wife, Mucia, the half-sister of Metellus Nepos, partly due to her adultery and partly to distance himself from the riots for which Metellus Nepos was blamed, and asked to marry one of Cato's nieces. The alliance proposal reflected Cato's recognition as a major political player; Cato rejected the offer, indicating that he likely had already made up his mind to oppose Pompey's eastern settlements and proposals.

In doing so, he drew a wedge between Pompey and the senate. His anti-Pompeian policy was likely a political error: Pompey was then seeking to reconcile with the senate; Cato's refusal forced Pompey to look for alternative allies to provide promised retirement lands to his veterans and secure ratification of his eastern settlements. He first sought to have one of his legates elected as consul for 60 BC: to do this, he distributed enormous bribes among the voters. In response, Cato again championed legislation banning bribery (proposed by a tribune named Marcus Aufidius Lurco), which was defeated, in part because the voters liked receiving payments for their votes. At the elections, Pompey's legate was successful, as well as Quintus Caecilius Metellus Celer, who had become one of Pompey's enemies after Pompey's divorce of Celer's half-sister, Mucia. Celer, along with Cato and Lucullus, then proceeded successfully to obstruct Pompey's agenda through the year. In this year, he also opposed a plan to renegotiate publicani tax collection contracts in Asia brought by Marcus Licinius Crassus with filibuster tactics, unheedful of alienating the wealthy publicani. Cato's success in opposing Pompey and Crassus' agendas forced them to recalculate; for both men, these were vital promises they had made to key supporters.

The return of Caesar from Spain in June of 60 BC forced Caesar too to choose: he either could enter the city and give up his command to stand for the consulship or he would retain the command in hopes for a triumph, per the law passed during Cato's tribunate. Caesar requested dispensation from the law from the senate – such dispensations were normal – but Cato proceeded to filibuster the request. In response, Caesar surprisingly gave up his triumph to stand for the consulship. Cato and his allies had tried to disincentivise Caesar's campaign by assigning the next year's consuls to an unimportant job in Italy. They also sought to get an opponent – Cato's son-in-law Marcus Calpurnius Bibulus – elected as Caesar's consular colleague, including by ignoring their own anti-bribery positions when matching the enormous bribes paid out by Caesar and his allies. In the end, both Caesar and Bibulus were elected as consuls for 59 BC.

Cato's successful opposition to Pompey and Crassus seemed to forebode poorly for Caesar's chance on his entrance to the consulship. Faced with this obstructionism and his need to make a success of his consulship, Caesar responded by forming an alliance with Pompey and Crassus, today known as the First Triumvirate. (Note: Use of the term "First Triumvirate" rejected by some modern scholars, who view it as a modern anachronism which "is misleading in equating the position of the 50s with the official triumvirate of Antony, Lepidus, and Octavian". Similarly, "it is almost impossible to use the phrase 'First Triumvirate' without adopting some version of the view that it was a kind of conspiracy against the republic... Nomenclature matters... I eschew the traditional 'First Triumvirate' altogether". See also Beard, Mary (2015). SPQR: a history of ancient Rome. W.W. Norton. p. 278. "Gang of Three".) Caesar would play the junior partner and, as a middleman, ensure that Pompey and Crassus (who were themselves rivals) could cooperate.

==== Caesar's consulship (59 BC) ====
Caesar's consular year started with his bringing a bill before the senate to distribute public lands to poor citizens and Pompey's veterans. Well written, brought in the traditional manner, and deferential to the senate's prerogatives, Cato lacked any real justification to oppose it; he settled instead for filibustering. For the whole of January, he prevented the senate from acting on the bill and was dragged to prison at Caesar's orders before being released. Caesar moved instead to bring the matter before the people.

Bibulus, called to a public debate on the bill, offered no substantive reasons for opposition before exclaiming, in frustration, "You will not have this law this year, not even should you all want it!" Thereafter, Cato and Bibulus entered the forum every morning to declare unfavourable religious omens and preclude a vote, until one morning they were assaulted in the street and driven off, pelted with manure. The bill then passed. Added to Caesar's bill was the requirement that senators swear to uphold the law or face punishment; Cato and an ally refused, until Cicero gave a face-saving argument that Cato's presence at Rome would serve the republic far more than his exile, leading them to take the oath on the last day before the deadline.

With a sufficient portion of the public on Caesar's side after Bibulus' embarrassing display of obstinate obstructionism and Bibulus' self-confinement to his home, Caesar moved rapidly to pass further legislation. Over the first half of the year, he passed laws:

- recognising Ptolemy XII Auletes as Egyptian king,
- ratifying Pompey's eastern settlements,
- bailing out the publicani tax farmers for Crassus, and
- adding Campania to his lex agraria.

Cato and his allies continued to resist these bills, but were unsuccessful. Plutarch reports Cato was again dragged to prison for his opposition, but this may be apocryphal. He also opposed the lex Vatinia which assigned to Caesar the provinces of Cisalpine Gaul and Illyricum for five years. Alone, he also opposed Caesar's assignment to Transalpine Gaul as well. Cato and his allies may also have engaged in a boycott of public business to cast doubt on the legitimacy of Caesar's acts.

Cato, however, supported one bill Caesar brought forth, the lex Iulia de repetundis, which detailed specific financial and administrative duties for governors to prevent extortion and embezzlement by provincial governors. His opposition to Caesar's legislative programme was likely focused only on those bills which would benefit Caesar personally, which – unlike passing land reform laws – suppressing corruption would not do.

Throughout the consulship, Cato and his allies also produced a substantive amount of propaganda meant to discredit Caesar and his triumviral allies by branding them tyrants, a message reinforced by the violence visited upon Bibulus to secure passage of the agrarian law; the campaign was successful in making it difficult for the three allies to use mob tactics out of fear that they might validate the opposition's rumours. The senators cowed into assent to Caesar's policies started to filter out of Caesar's camp – though this did not mean they became Catonians – leading to another reshuffling of alliances.

==== Cyprus (58 BC) ====
Following Caesar's consulship and departure to Gaul, opponents of Caesar started to move to question the legal validity of his legislative actions. They also brought Publius Vatinius, the tribune who had passed the lex Vatinia assigning the provinces to Caesar, to stand charges, but the court proceedings were disrupted by a mob led by Publius Clodius Pulcher.

Pulcher had been elected during Caesar's consulship as one of the plebeian tribunes of 58 BC. Also in office were a number of triumvirate-friendly magistrates, including both consuls. In March of that year, Clodius promulgated a bill annexing the island of Cyprus. The assignment of governor was initially slated for one of the consuls – Aulus Gabinius, a friend of Pompey, – but after he was unable to take the post, Clodius promulgated a bill to appoint Cato instead as pro quaestore pro praetore. Reasons for the appointment are divided: the traditional view is that Clodius wanted Cato away on business; other historians have suggested that doing so was instead an attempt to forge a political alliance or that Cato allowed Clodius to send Cicero into exile for the appointment. Accounts of public reactions to the appointment also were divided: Cicero, for example, praised Cato for accepting it, as, even though Cicero rejected the annexation, he believed Cato to be the right person for the job; on the other hand, Plutarch reports that Cato was forced by law to go. Modern historians also see another reason: there was little productive to do in Rome when triumviral allies controlled all the major magistracies; leaving for Cyprus would allow Cato to buttress his reputation as an honest governor while waiting for the political winds to shift.

After arriving in Cyprus and announcing annexation, the local king – a Roman ally – there killed himself rather than suffer the indignity of deposition. Cato then personally catalogued and solicited bids on all the royal possessions. In doing so, he demonstrated great diligence, but alienated some of his friends in the meantime, receiving them poorly and treating them with suspicion. Cato's loss of his account books, low amount recovered from Cyprus, and over-preparation on his return to Rome could indicate that he engaged in some modest embezzlements or allowed his nephew, Marcus Junius Brutus, to engage in usurious moneylending or embezzlement on his behalf. His administration of Cyprus, was, however, well regarded on his reputation for honesty alone. Upon his return, he held a de facto glittering naval parade up the Tiber before starting a procession conveying the treasures to the treasury.

==== Return from Cyprus ====
By the time Cato returned from Cyprus, Clodius and Pompey had turned on each other and Cicero had been recalled from exile with Pompey's support. Cicero's gratitude and debt to Pompey had him support Pompey's ambitions: shortly after his return, Cicero proposed a prestigious and wide-ranging grain commission and proposed extraordinarily long supplicationes for Caesar's Gallic victories. Cato also divorced his loving wife Marcia so he could – with her father's consent – marry her to his friend, Quintus Hortensius, in part to cement an alliance.

By 56 BC, the triumviral coalition was faring poorly. With Pompey attacked both by the conservative Cato-aligned senators and by Clodius – who was himself an independent operator – Pompey was forced to double down in his alliance with the other triumvirs. Added was the threat of Caesar's replacement in Gaul, setting up the renewal of the triumviral coalition at the Luca Conference: Caesar would, for Pompey, bring Clodius to heel; both Pompey and Crassus would receive prestigious military commands following a dual consulship; and Caesar would be renewed in Gaul. Without the ability to win elections outright, the three allies decided to postpone the elections into the new year, force the election of an interrex, and hopefully in the chaos secure consulships for Pompey and Crassus.

The consuls of 56 BC resigned without replacement at the close of their terms; the republic started 55 BC without magistrates. At untimely elections in late January marred by mob violence, Cato supported Lucius Domitius Ahenobarbus, his brother-in-law. After the triumvirs distributed bribes and used violence to force the other candidates from the elections, Pompey and Crassus were elected consuls for 55 BC and took office immediately. At those elections, Cato stood for the praetorship against Publius Vatinius; he secured support among the initial voters, so Pompey interrupted the elections to give more bribes and remove known Catonian voters. Vatinius was then elected.

At the debate that year about the lex Trebonia to grant Crassus the province of Syria so he could fight a war of choice against the Parthian Empire, Cato again repeated his tactic of filibustering until his opponents had him arrested so he could claim to be poorly treated. To avoid a repeat of this embarrassment, at later debates, his attendance was barred by armed mobs. He tried similar obstructive tactics against the lex Licinia Pompeia to extend Caesar's command, but again failed. At this time, Plutarch reports – if not an injection of imaginative foreshadowing – that Cato moved to split Pompey from Caesar rather than opposing the united triumvirate. At the end of the year, Pompey was to assume his command in Spain but decided against tradition to stay near Rome and govern entirely through his legates.

==== Praetorship (54 BC) ====
Pompey and Crassus' consulship, while a short-term success, was unsuccessful in the long-run. The elections for the magistrates for 54 BC were a victory for Cato and his allies. Without violence to force a decision in their favour, the electorate reacted coldly to the triumvirs' favoured candidates. Lucius Domitius Ahenobarbus – who had stood the previous year – and Appius Claudius Pulcher were elected. Cato was returned for a praetorship and allotted the presidency of the extortion court. Opponents of the triumvirs immediately brought a number of prosecutions against the triumvirs' allies; almost all, however, ended up being acquitted. Defendants, drawing on support from people in various pro- and anti-triumviral factions, remained able to use personal connections over factional allegiances.

One case was that against Aulus Gabinius, who was convicted for receiving a ten thousand talent bribe from Ptolemy XII Auletes to invade Egypt and place him back on the throne. Gabinius was forced into exile. Of the many prosecutions brought against triumviral supporters, Gabinius' was the only one successful. Cato may also have tendentiously interpreted the jurisdiction of his corruption court so he could push through prosecutions he had yet been unable to do via normal legislation.

Cato also brought legislation to clamp down on electoral bribery by requiring that all candidates submit detailed financial records. But the bill, although passed by the senate, was unpopular among the people and defeated. Bribes for votes were a regular stream of income for many people; shutting down corruption would have been a self-inflicted financial wound. Similarly unpopular was Cato's reaction to Caesar's victories over the Gauls and Germans. On receipt of reports that Caesar had attacked during a truce but won a victory in which he killed some 430,000 Germans, Cato objected to it as a sacrilege against the gods and demanded Caesar's surrender to the Germans. None joined him.

That year also proved that Cato's push for stronger anti-bribery legislation had both been a failure and was deeply needed. As interest rates in the city doubled as candidates borrowed to finance bribes, a deal was struck between the two conservative sitting consuls, a triumviral supporter, and a triumviral opponent to pool resources to bribe voters and support the sitting consuls' assignment to desirable provinces. When one of the participants disclosed the plot to the senate, all were charged with electoral corruption, with the largest loss falling on the consul Domitius (Cato's brother-in-law). In response to the scandal, the senate delayed elections for an inquiry, but tribunes began to obstruct the elections by repeatedly declaring bad omens.

==== Chaos ====
Repeated tribunician vetoes prevented elections to be held in 54 for the magistrates for 53 BC. The ancient sources believe that the delays were artificially created to justify the creation of Pompey as dictator, calls which Cato and senators such as Marcus Junius Brutus, strongly opposed. After Cato praised Pompey on his civic-mindedness in publicly refusing a possible dictatorship, the political situation stabilised and two conservative consuls, Gnaeus Domitius Calvinus and Marcus Valerius Messalla Rufus, were elected in July 53 BC. During their truncated terms, they seem only to have tried to pass one bill, to introduce a delay between magistracy and governorship of five years: doing so reduced the ability for consuls to select their own provinces and made it more difficult to borrow money, to be repaid from provincial earnings, by delaying those provincial earnings. Cato was probably one of the co-authors and major supporters of the proposal; it was, however, defeated before the people and panned by younger senators.

While Caesar's daughter, Julia, had died the previous year, Pompey's support of Caesar continued: he lent a legion from Spain to Gaul at Caesar's request (a deal Cato condemned for bypassing the senate and treating public legions as personal property). Also in 53, news arrived of Crassus' defeat and death at the hands of the Parthians in Syria. While Plutarch reports this made a confrontation between Caesar and Pompey inevitable, their alliance did not immediately break down, even after Pompey's marriage to Cornelia Metella.

The year also was rocked with political violence between the duelling mobs led by Clodius and Titus Annius Milo, who also was standing for the consulship. Their months-long clashes, along with tribunician obstruction against the holding of elections, led again to calls for Pompey as dictator. After the year 52 started with no magistrates and Clodius was murdered by Milo after a chance encounter outside of Rome, the level of violence increased; among other things, the senate house and the Basilica Porcia in the Forum was destroyed by fire in Clodius' makeshift funeral pyre.

==== Pompey's sole consulship (52 BC) ====
With a political impasse and anarchy in the streets, Cato and Bibulus proposed making Pompey sole consul (i.e. consul without a colleague). Plutarch and others report that this was to deny Pompey a dictatorship while also establishing a functioning government. Some modern historians, such as John Ramsey, however, conceive of the choice in political terms: the obstructive tribunes wanted to prosecute Milo for Clodius' murder, which could not happen if he were elected to the consulship and gained legal immunity. Electing Pompey alone would stabilise the city and, by precluding Milo's election, ensure Milo could be brought to trial. While a clear departure from tradition, it allowed Pompey to be brought on side while also restoring order to the city without handing Pompey unlimited power.

Pompey's sole consulship was a turning point in the republic. He convened a trial, with the jury intimidated by his soldiers, in which Milo was charged with public disorder. Cato was one of the jurors and two of his allies helped conduct the trial, which may indicate a compromise to bring Milo to trial; Cato made clear his vote for acquittal, but – even with Cicero defending – Milo was condemned regardless. However, Cato had not succeeded in bringing Pompey fully into the senatorial fold: Pompey during his consulship supported the so-called "law of the ten tribunes" which granted Caesar the right to stand for the consulship in absentia.

With starting success in forcing a break between Pompey and Caesar, Cato stood for the consulship of 51 BC. He reportedly did so out of a claim of public duty, in the vein of Lucius Quinctius Cincinnatus being summoned by the people, to defend the republic from Caesar and Pompey. He was defeated after running an austere campaign. Erich Gruen summarises: he "distribute[d] no cash and promise[d] no favours; the campaign seem[ed] to have been designed to win admiration rather than votes". Cicero complained that while the state needed him, Cato was unwilling or unable to set aside his scruples so to actually win a consular election; after his defeat, Cato did not stand for the consulship again.

=== Caesar's civil war ===
Cato's movements during the civil war. In , movements from Rome to the Battle of Pharsalus. In , movements after that battle to Utica. Movement from Cyrene to Africa is striped. Cato may have travelled by land (per Plutarch) or by sea (per Dio).

The First Triumvirate had been formed to get around Cato's obstructionism. From around 52 BC onwards, Cato tried to separate Pompey from Caesar. For some time, Pompey tried to keep his options open, but was eventually won over that his pre-eminence was incompatible with Caesar's rising influence and popularity. Cato continued to arrange opposition to Caesar and continued to spread the view that Caesar was a tyrant-in-making, which by 51 BC became a common view among the senatorial elite. However, by this point, events began to spiral out of Cato's control, as the initiative moved towards Cato's allies who, unlike Cato, were willing to go to any length to destroy Caesar.

Attempts to recall Caesar from Gaul started in earnest in 51 BC under consul Marcus Claudius Marcellus (Cato's former quaestorian colleague). After Caesar's victory at the Battle of Alesia, Marcellus argued the rationale for Caesar's standing for the consulship in absentia was gone and that Caesar's provincia (here meaning "task") was complete and, therefore, he and his army should return home. Such attempts were vetoed by Caesar's allies in the tribunate and also opposed by Pompey. The next year, 50 BC, the senate was starting to move in earnest to discuss termination of Caesar's command; in response, Caesar tried to secure new allies with bribes, including one of the consuls elected for the year, Lucius Aemilius Paullus.

Among Caesar's allies was Gaius Scribonius Curio, who cleverly proposed that both Caesar and Pompey should disarm by giving up their commands concurrently; Cato, in a possibly apocryphal outburst related by Plutarch, exclaimed that the proposal was a Caesarian plot to take over the government. Such strong opposition would have been inconsistent with Cato's general policy of acting against concentrated power and would in addition have been premature. Regardless, the majority of senators viewed the proposal favourably, as mutual disarmament would bring down tensions and avert a possible civil war. Opposition to Curio's proposal highlighted that Pompey's term in Spain was still relatively recent, having been granted in 52 BC, making it unjustifiable to strip Pompey of his command so soon. However, the vast majority of the senate (370 to 22) accepted Curio's compromise. Cato's vote on this important matter is unrecorded, though most historians believe Cato voted against it, probably to pressure Caesar to fold. Some historians, however, such as Helga Botermann, believe that letters from Seneca may suggest that Cato voted in favour.

Cato's years of advocacy against Caesar had inculcated a confrontational anti-Caesarian policy among younger senators, hoping that a united senatorial front would force Caesar to fold. The success of his strategy of branding Caesar a tyrant convinced many senators to choose war over negotiations. By the weeks before the start of the war in early January 49 BC, Cato, Pompey, and their allies had hardened their political position to the point where they were unwilling to offer any concessions at all. Cato continued to push Pompey and others to maintain a hard line, rejecting all proposed compromises, in the hope that Caesar would back down. On the 7th of January 49 BC the senate was sufficiently frightened and browbeaten to pass a senatus consultum ultimum against Caesar, likely under the false pretences that Caesar was already invading.

==== Flight from Italy ====
Caesar did not back down and instead crossed the Rubicon. Cato's political strategy had pushed Caesar into a position where the only way out of political extinction would be civil war. When Caesar chose civil war, Cato's demeanour shifted and he quickly started to push for a negotiated settlement. When news of Caesar's rapid advance south reached Rome, Pompey made the decision to flee Italy for the eastern provinces and to use the fleet to contain Caesar to Italy before retaking the peninsula.

When Caesar offered peace terms on 23 January that he would be willing to lay down his command and stand for a consulship in person in return for amnesty and Pompey's departure to Spain, Cicero relates that Cato strongly supported the plan and forced himself into the war council at which the proposal was discussed. That the peace offers were decisively rejected by the hard-liners who wanted to defeat Caesar militarily indicates that Cato by this point had lost control of his coalition. He attempted to have the senate give Pompey overall command, but the senate chose to divide command among various generals, whom Caesar then defeated in detail.

Pompey assigned Cato to Sicily to raise men and supplies. Pompey may have wanted to keep Cato and his gloomy attitude on the civil war away from the actual fighting. Another reconstruction, however, places Cato at the centre of an abortive strategy to blockade Italy and starve Caesar out by stripping Italy of Sicilian grain supplies. But on 23 April, after being faced with a landing by Gaius Asinius Pollio, he abandoned the island – apparently, according to Cicero, without giving battle even though his forces were sufficient to resist. Whatever the immediate situation, after further Caesarian landings under Curio, Cato would regardless have been forced to retreat.

==== Greece and Africa ====
After retreating, Cato joined Pompey at Dyrrhachium. Upon his arrival there, Plutarch relates that Cato admitted that Cicero's more moderate policy, advocating compromise with Caesar, had been correct: "[Cato's] distress at the consequences of his own hard-line policies... may have been weigh heavily on him". He was then sent to Asia Minor to organise transport ships; but finding no need for himself, he induced Rhodes to take Pompey's side and left his family there before returning to Pompey in Greece, where he declined command of naval forces, citing Bibulus' senior consular status. After the indecisive Pompeian victory at the Battle of Dyrrhachium, Cato is said to have been greatly affected by the sight of the casualties.

Cato was not present at the Battle of Pharsalus. He had opposed the proposals that Pompey should chase Caesar down after his withdrawal from Dyrrhachium. Left behind in command at Dyrrhachium, also possibly for political reasons to remove critics (including Cicero) from decision-making following a prospective Pompeian victory, Cato received news of the defeat from Titus Labienus. In the aftermath of the defeat, he decamped to Corcyra and asked Cicero to take command because he still held imperium from his promagistracy and was the senior consular present; Cicero declined, preferring instead to return home and seek Caesar's pardon. Allowing defectors to leave peacefully, Cato loaded his men and set sail for Egypt via Cyrene. But learning of Pompey's death at the hands of the Ptolemies and that Quintus Caecilius Metellus Pius Scipio was still in command in Africa, he moved to join them. Discovering a fractured situation, he reconciled Metellus Scipio with Publius Attius Varus and had Metellus Scipio put in command. While the recorded reasons were that Cato believed that Metellus Scipio had both consular dignity and a name that would inspire the soldiers, as the inheritor of the Cornelii Scipiones that had defeated Hannibal, it is possible that Cato was simply unwilling to lead a fight against fellow citizens.

=== Final campaign and death ===
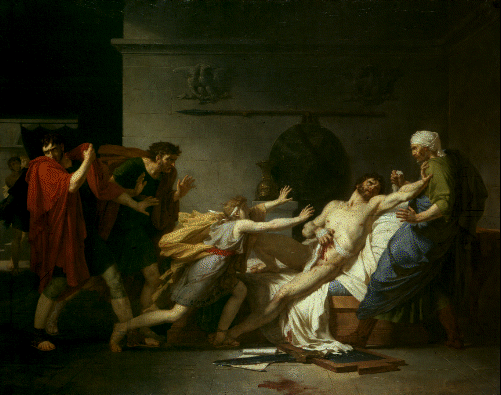
A 1797 depiction of Cato's death by Pierre Narcisse Guérin.

Cato was given command of the city of Utica after convincing Metellus Scipio to spare the town's inhabitants when they attempted to defect to Caesar. He successfully expanded the city's defences, raised troops, and stockpiled supplies while waiting for Caesar's eventual arrival. During his time in Africa, however, Cato became convinced that victory for his own cause under Metellus Scipio would be accompanied by appalling reprisals.

When Cato pushed for a strategy of attrition against Caesar, Metellus Scipio accused Cato of cowardice for being unwilling to risk battle. Around this time, Cato privately confided that the war was hopeless and that he would abandon Rome regardless of the victor. Metellus Scipio ignored Cato's relatively pacific advice and engaged in a decisive battle at Thapsus, where his forces were annihilated.

Cato, garrisoning Utica, received news of the defeat three days later, which drove the city into a panic. Knowing that the city would likely defect, Cato evacuated any Roman citizens who wished to flee. He also sent an embassy consisting of his family and allies, headed by one of Caesar's kinsmen, Lucius Julius Caesar, to seek pardon for themselves. Cato himself prepared for death.

After righting the city's financial accounts and disbursing the remaining monies to the city's inhabitants, Cato discussed with his friends at dinner the Stoic belief that a truly free man would never become a slave. After he demanded his sword, which had been removed from his room, his family and friends begged him not to kill himself. Dismissing them, he asked for a report on the ships fleeing the city. Satisfied that all was well, he stabbed himself in the abdomen. The specific details of Cato's suicide were greatly embellished after his death, especially in Plutarch's account, which states:

Cato drew his sword from its sheath and stabbed himself below the breast. His thrust, however, was somewhat feeble... [and] he did not at once dispatch himself... His servants heard the noise and cried out, and his son at once ran in, together with his friends... [A] physician went to him and tried to replace his bowels, which remained uninjured, and to sew up the wound. Accordingly, when Cato recovered and became aware of this, he pushed the physician away, tore his bowels with his hands, rent the wound still more, and so died.

Caesar is said to have responded to his death by lamenting that Cato's death meant Caesar could not pardon him.

== Legacy and reception ==
Cato's death triggered a series of eulogies, of which both Cicero and Brutus were authors, starting to identify Cato as a great Stoic philosopher. Caesar responded with an Anticato, which has not survived.

=== Political legacy ===
The traditional political culture of the middle republic was one built around aristocratic compromise, political debate, and reform. The extent of Cato's obstruction broke down the traditional republican norms of compromise and discussion; escalation in response to that obstruction proved dangerous to the republic and ran contrary to its ethos. His policies with regard to stopping powerful politicians such as Pompey, Caesar, and Crassus alienated – through its very success – them from the rest of the senatorial class, leading to the formation of their alliance in 59 BC.

Many scholars believe that Cato's political strategy before 49 BC contributed significantly in starting the civil war that was the proximate cause of the collapse of the Roman republic, even if he did not intend for conflict. While his strategy – convincing senators that Caesar was a threat to the republic and wanted to make himself king – was successful, that success backfired when those senators then gambled everything on defeating Caesar, whom they saw as an existential threat to liberty, in civil war.

During most of his political career, he consistently obstructed powerful military figures to the fullest extent possible. This uncompromising position had him push strongly, before the civil war, for further confrontation with Caesar, seemingly to pressure Caesar to back down. Cato and his allies also pushed Pompey away from the various olive branches and compromises before the civil war. Up to the last, when Pompey was close to accepting an offer where Caesar would give up all his legions except one and provinces except Illyricum, Cato played on Pompey's paranoia by painting Pompey as a Caesarian mark. To the extent that Caesar may have feared prosecution, conviction, and exile – a claim no longer accepted without controversy – Cato was one of the few pushing strongly for Caesar's political destruction via prosecution.

Posthumously, Cato's opposition to Caesar was cast in predominantly ideological terms, with Cato serving as a heroic symbol of republican values amid its collapse. His life was also appropriated by Augustus as a symbol of republican values.

Cato's commitment to liberty and resistance to tyranny inspired Cato's Letters, a series of 18th-century political essays by John Trenchard and Thomas Gordon, which played a significant role in shaping Enlightenment political thought and the principles underlying the American Revolution.

=== As a stoic ===
Some scholars point to how Cato acted in ways profoundly inconsistent with Stoic tenets: his anger at the breaking of his betrothal to Aemilia Lepida, breakdown over the death of his half-brother Caepio, his visible despair at the sight of casualties from the civil wars, etc. For such scholars, Cato's actions fit into the mould of a traditional Roman acting in line with traditional Roman values rather than Stoic ones. On the other hand, others point out that Cato's contemporaries noted his Stoic behaviours and positions explicitly. Cicero lampooned it in Pro Murena, and also mentioned it in letters and contemporaneous philosophical texts.

Modern scholars such as Kit Morell note that portrayal of Cato as a "Stoic martyr" in the ancient sources has distorted or distracted from the historical Cato.

== Family ==
=== Cato himself ===
- Engaged to Aemilia Lepida, but engagement called off
- First wife, Atilia (divorced)
  - Porcia, married first to Marcus Calpurnius Bibulus, then to Marcus Junius Brutus
  - Marcus Porcius Cato, later killed in the Second Battle of Philippi
- Second (and third) wife Marcia.

=== Descent from Cato the Elder ===
- Marcus Porcius Cato (cos. 195 BC)
  - Marcus Porcius Cato Licinianus (pr. 152 BC)
    - Marcus Porcius Cato (cos. 118 BC)
      - Marcus Porcius Cato (pr. c. 92 BC)
    - Gaius Porcius Cato (cos. 114 BC)
  - Marcus Porcius Cato Salonianus (pr. ? BC)
    - Marcus Porcius Cato (pl. tr. 99 BC)
      - Porcia (wife of Domitius Ahenobarbus)
      - Marcus Porcius Cato "Uticensis" (pr. 54 BC)
        - Porcia (wife of Brutus)
        - Marcus Porcius Cato (died 42 BC)
    - Lucius Porcius Cato (cos. 89 BC)

All information from Drogula 2019, Preface.

=== As part of Brutus' family ===
Brutus family tree

Salonia (2) | Cato the Elder | Licinia (1)
Marcus Porcius Cato Salonianus | Marcus Porcius Cato Licinianus | Marcus Livius Drusus
Marcus Porcius Cato (2) | Livia | Quintus Servilius Caepio (1) | Marcus Livius Drusus
Atilia (1) | Cato the Younger | Marcus Livius Drusus Claudianus, adopted son
Marcus Junius Brutus (1) | Servilia, mistress of Julius Caesar (see AUGUSTUS below) | Decimus Junius Silanus (2) | Servilia | Gnaeus Servilius Caepio | Lucius Appuleius SATURNINUS
Marcus Porcius Cato | Porcia | Marcus Junius Brutus† | Junia Prima | Junia Tertia | Gaius Cassius Longinus x | Marcus Aemilius Lepidus (consul 78 BC) | Appuleia, daughter of SATURNINUS
Junia Secunda | Marcus Aemilius Lepidus (triumvir) | Lucius Aemilius Paullus (consul 50 BC)
Descendant of POMPEY MAGNUS and Lucius Cornelius SULLA | son (perhaps Quintus Aemilius Lepdius?) | Marcus Aemilius Lepidus Minor (the Younger) | Servilia Isaurica, daughter of Junia Prima (see above) and Publius Servilius Isauricus | Emperor AUGUSTUS (possibly, see JULIO-CLAUDIANS for descendants) | Paullus Aemilius Lepidus | Cornelia, daughter of Gnaeus Cornelius Lentulus Marcellinus and Scribonia, wife of AUGUSTUS and mother of Julia the Elder
Manius Aemilius Lepidus | Aemilia Lepida II (also engaged to Lucius Caesar, see JULIO-CLAUDIANS and AUGUSTUS) | Publius Sulpicius Quirinius (of the Sulpicia gens, related to GALBA below) | Lucius Aemilius Paullus (consul 1) | Julia the Younger, daughter of Julia the Elder and Marcus Vispanius Agrippa, see AUGUSTUS and Cornelia above | Marcus Aemilius Lepidus (consul 6 AD)
daughter (perhaps known as Aemilia Lepida?)
Aemilia Lepida | Servius Sulpicius GALBA | Mamercus Aemilius Scaurus (of the Aemilia gens, related to the Lepidae) | Marcus Junius Silanus Torquatus (of the Junia gens, related to BRUTUS, see above) | Aemilia Lepida | CLAUDIUS (see AUGUSTUS above and JULIO-CLAUDIANS) | Lucius Vitellius (consul 34) | Livilla, daughter of Drusus the Elder and sister of Germanicus and CLAUDIUS, aunt of Drusus Caesar (see JULIO-CLAUDIANS and to the right) | Lucius Aelius Sejanus, the almost emperor | Aemilia Lepida | Drusus Caesar, son of Agrippina the Elder, daughter of Julia the Elder (see AUGUSTUS and Julia the Younger above and see JULIO-CLAUDIANS)
Gaius Cassius Longinus (descended from or related to GAIUS CASSIUS LONGINUS, see above) | Junia Lepida | Junia Calvina | Lucius Vitellius (consul 48) | Aulus VITELLIUS (for Otho's relation, in terms of the Year of the Four Emperors, he married Poppaea Sabina, who married NERO, see AUGUSTUS and CLAUDIUS above)
Cassia Longina | Gnaeus Domitius Corbulo, brother of Milona, wife of CALIGULA, see JULIO-CLAUDIANS and see above
Lucius Aelius Lamia Plautius Aelianus | Domitia Longina | Domitian, see FLAVIANS and VESPASIAN
Plautia (possibly existed, although unsure, but if so, then her brother is Lucius Fundanius Lamia Aelianus, father of Lucius Plautius Lamia Silvanus, alleged ancestor of Fabia Orestilla, wife of Gordian I, see GORDIANS) | Lucius Ceionius Commodus
Lucius Aelius Caesar | Marcus Aurelius (see NERVA-ANTONINES)
Lucius Verus (for further relations, see NERVA-ANTONINES) | Lucilla

(1): 1st spouse
(2): 2nd spouse
†: assassin of Caesar

== See also ==
- Porcia gens
