= Herwart von Hohenburg =

Bavarian statesman and scholar

Hans Georg Herwart von Hohenburg (also Hans Georg Hörwarth; 1553–1622) was a Bavarian statesman and scholar, and a patron and correspondent of Johannes Kepler.

Herwart served as chancellor to the Duke of Bavaria, and was regarded by the Bavarian aristocracy as an effective intermediary during the turbulent transition from the reign of Duke Wilhelm V to that of his successor, Maximilian I.

Herwart's fields as a scholar were astronomy, chronology, mathematics and philology. His work in chronology was admired by Michael Mästlin, among others, and his work in mathematics contributed to the early formulation of logarithms by Joost Bürgi and John Napier. He was also associated with Tycho Brahe, Johannes Praetorius, and Helisaeus Roeslin.

Herwart often lent Kepler books that might otherwise have been unavailable to him, and used his influence to help Kepler retain academic appointments despite his Protestantism, as Herwart himself was "an ardent Catholic and a friend of the Jesuits." His extant correspondence with Kepler covers a period from 1597 to 1611 and includes more than 90 letters. The correspondence was discovered by C. Anschütz at Munich, and was first published in 1886. A sample exchange, on an astronomical passage from the Neronian poet Lucan, is available online in English translation.

Herwart published a multiplication table in a folio volume of more than a thousand pages, Tabulae arithmeticae προσθαφαιρἐσεως universales, (Munich, 1610).

Herwart also authored his Thesaurus Hieroglyphicorum which was a paper museum containing illustrations of all the objects he could find that were relevant to his interest in Egyptian antiquities.
