= Aemilius Macer (jurist) =

3rd century Roman jurist

Aemilius Macer was a Roman jurist active in the third century AD.

Usually denominated simply "Macer", he was the author of five works on Roman law: De Re Militari, Publica Judicia, De Officio Praesidis, Ad Legem Uicensimam Hereditatum, and De Appellationibus. Sixty-five extracts from Macer's works appear in the Digest.
