= Anticato =

Lost book by Julius Caesar against Cato the Younger

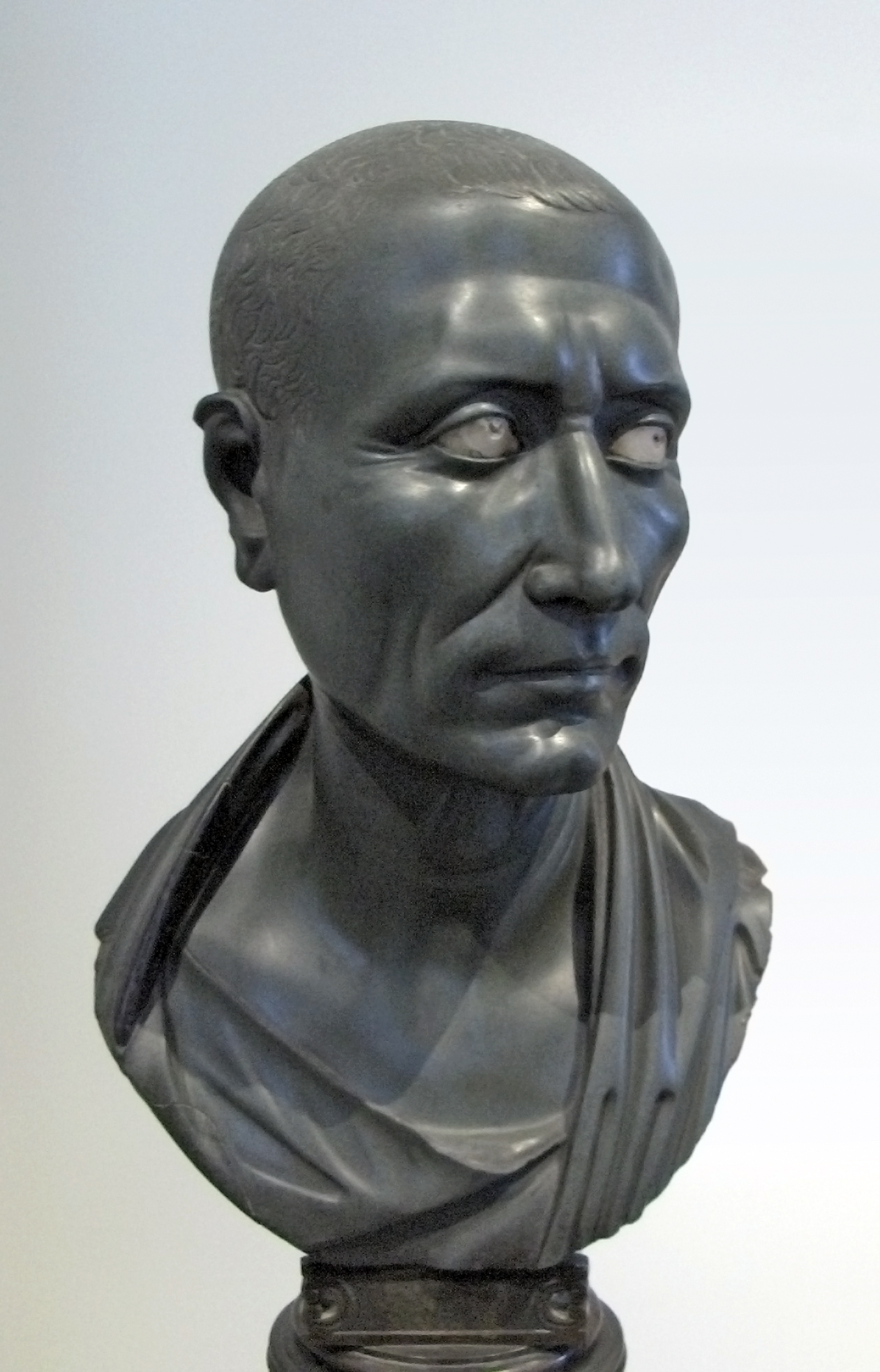
A bust of Caesar in the Altes Museum, Berlin.

The Anticato (sometimes Anti-Cato; Latin: Anticatones) is a lost polemic written by Julius Caesar in hostile reply to Cicero's pamphlet praising Cato the Younger. The text is lost and survives only in fragments. Brutus, dissatisfied with Cicero's work, wrote a second pamphlet in praise of Cato and called, simply, "Cato", which provoked a reply from Octavian. Octavian's work is not known to have been called "Anticato", but must have been modeled on Caesar's reply to Cicero.

== Background ==
Caesar famously crossed the Rubicon and came to Rome, sparking a civil war. When Caesar prevailed in the war and looked to seize power in Rome, Cato committed suicide. Several leading Romans wrote works in posthumous praise or criticism of Cato. A famous panegyric by Cicero titled simply Cato led to Caesar writing his Anticato in response.

== Sources ==
- Hazel, John, Who's Who - In the Roman World. London and New York: Routledge, 2001.
