= Quintus Minucius Thermus (governor of Asia) =

Roman tribune in 62 BC, praetor, and governor of Asia

Quintus Minucius Thermus (fl. 74–43 BC) was a Roman politician.

He belonged to a long-established senatorial family. His father, of the same name, had been a mint officer in 103 BC, and a war councilor in 89 BC during the Social War. The younger Thermus entered the Senate with his election as quaestor in 75 or 74 BC, and his name appears on a decree of the Senate inscribed at the Greek town of Oropos, dated 73 BC. In 62 BC, having been elected tribune of the plebs, Thermus cooperated with his colleague Cato in forcibly opposing a bill by the praetor Julius Caesar to reassign responsibility for the reconstruction of the Temple of Jupiter Capitolinus to Pompey. The attempt to overcome Cato and Thermus' veto triggered violent clashes and a senatus consultum ultimum before order was restored to the city.

Thermus held the office of praetor at some unknown date, perhaps c. 60–58 BC or possibly as late as 53 BC. From 51 to 50 BC, he was prorogued to Asia pro praetore and successfully administered the province, so much that even Cicero sent him letters with his compliments.

During Caesar's civil war, still holding imperium, he attempted to defend Iguvium (modern Gubbio) from Caesar's invasion of Italy, but his raw recruits deserted before the Caesarian advance under Curio, forcing him to retreat.

In 43 BC he was one of several envoys sent by the Senate to negotiate with Sextus Pompeius in Sicily.
