= Institutes (Gaius) =

Textbook on Roman private law (c. 161 CE)

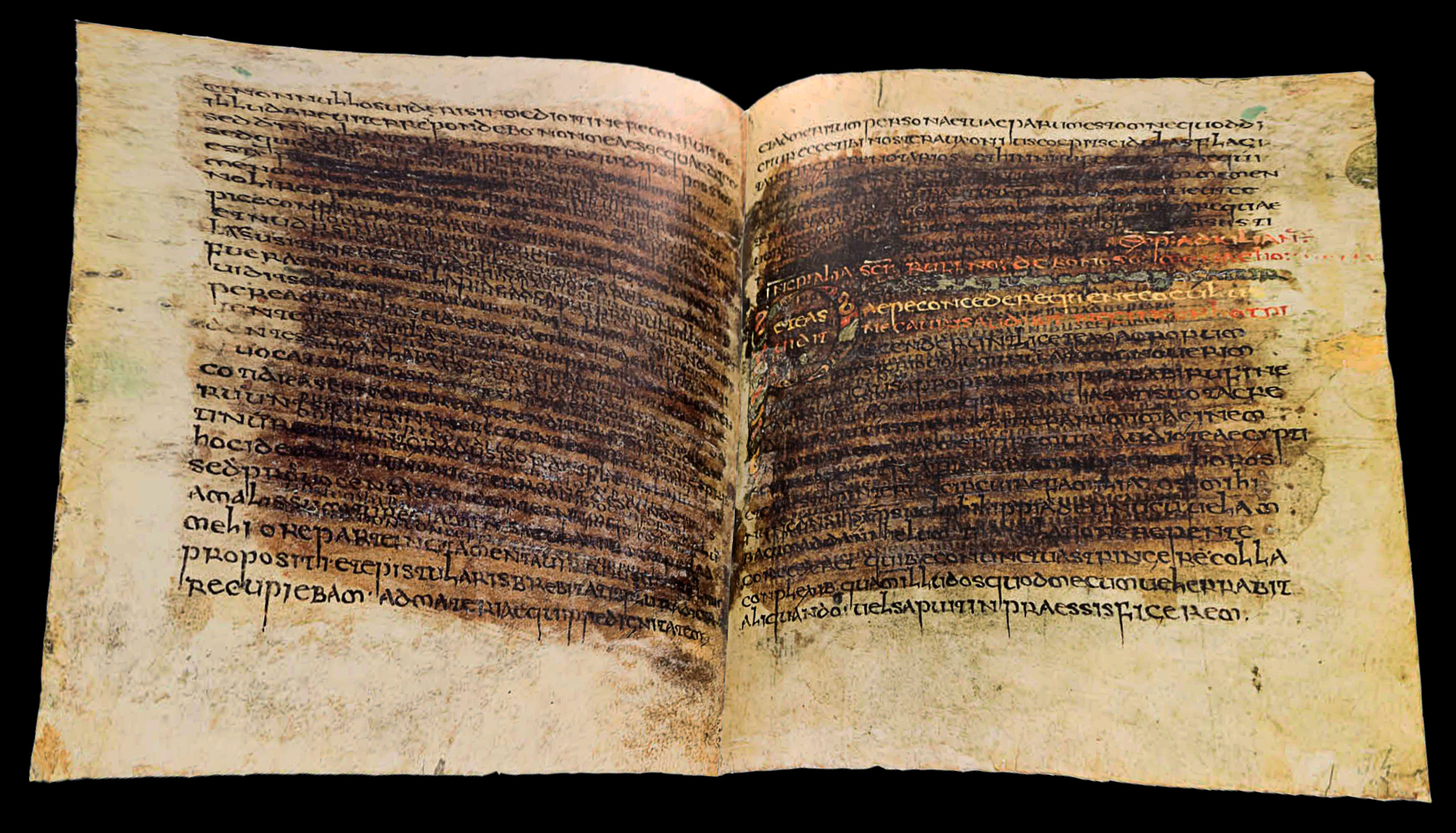
- The Codex Veronensis (copied around 500 AD) containing Gaius' Institutes
- Author: Gaius
- Original title: Institutiones
- Language: Latin
- Genre: Roman private law textbook
- Publication date: c. 161 AD
- Publication place: Roman Empire

The Institutes (Latin: Institutiones; from instituere, 'to establish') are a beginners' textbook on Roman private law written around 161 AD by the classical Roman jurist Gaius. They are considered to be "by far the most influential elementary-systematic presentation of Roman private law in late antiquity, the Middle Ages and modern times". The content of the textbook was thought to be lost until 1816, when a manuscript of it − probably of the 5th century − was discovered by Barthold Georg Niebuhr.

The Institutes are divided into four books: The first book considers the legal status of persons (personae), the second and third deal with things (res), while the fourth discusses Roman civil procedure (actiones). The original Latin text with an English translation by Francis De Zulueta covers around 300 pages (with critical notes).

== Discovery and textual history ==
=== Codex Veronensis ===
An almost complete version of the Institutes was discovered by Barthold Georg Niebuhr in 1816 in the form of a palimpsest in Verona (Austrian Empire, now in Italy). Niebuhr had just accepted a post as Prussian ambassador to the Papal States, when he was dispatched to negotiate a concordat with the Catholic Church. On his way to Rome, he systematically searched for palimpsests in various libraries, and discovered the respective manuscript in the Chapter Library of Verona. Under the visible text of the manuscript, which contained letters of Jerome, Niebuhr found an erased copy of the textbook, copied around 500 AD. The manuscript was written in uncial script and used abbreviations. An apographon of the manuscript was made in 1874 by Wilhelm Studemund.

The content of the Institutes had until then only been indirectly documented, for example in Justinian's Digesta. The manuscript discovered by Niebuhr is known today as the Codex Veronensis.

In a letter to the leading German jurist Savigny, Niebuhr had at first identified the manuscript as a work of Ulpian, but Savigny immediately suggested that it was, in fact, the famous work of Gaius. Savigny publicized the discovery of the manuscript and his conjecture, that Gaius' Institutes had been found, in the 1817 volume of his Zeitschrift für geschichtliche Rechtswissenschaft (Journal of Historical Jurisprudence).

Niebuhr vermuthet auf Ulpian; ich bin [...] geneigt, vielmehr die Institutionen des Gajus zu erwarten, so daß unser erstes Fragment ein einzelnes nicht rescribiertes Blatt derselben Handschrift wäre.

Niebuhr assumes Ulpian; [...] I am inclined to rather expect the Institutions of Gajus, so that our first fragment would be a single unrescribed page of the same manuscript.

— Friedrich Carl von Savigny, Neu entdeckte Quellen des Römischen Rechts [Newly discovered sources of Roman law]

The reason for Niebuhr's visit to Verona is still a somewhat contentious academic issue: Some scholars argue that Niebuhr was on a confidential mission to obtain the already discovered manuscript, while many others see a fortunate coincidence.

=== Egyptian fragments ===
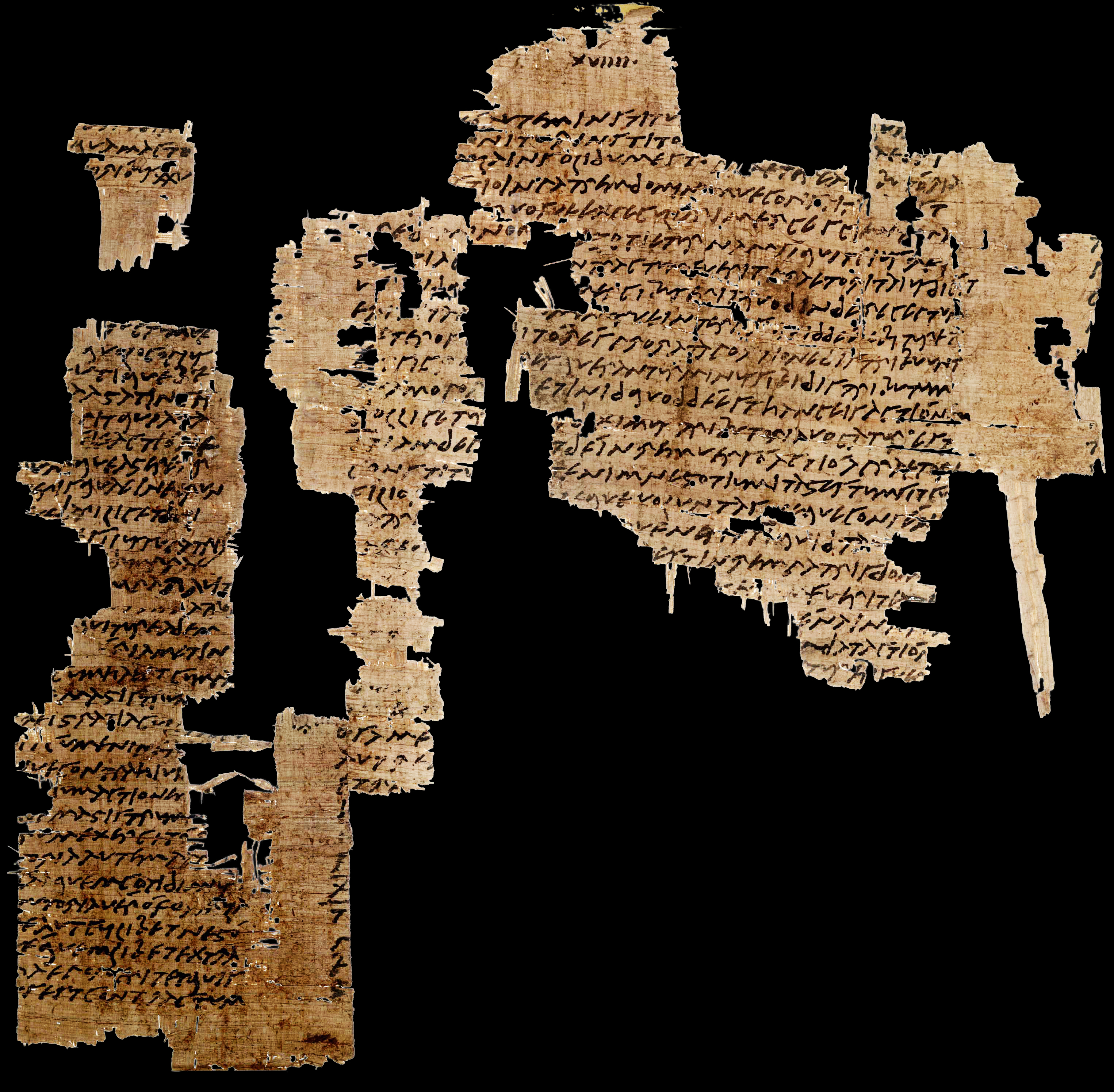
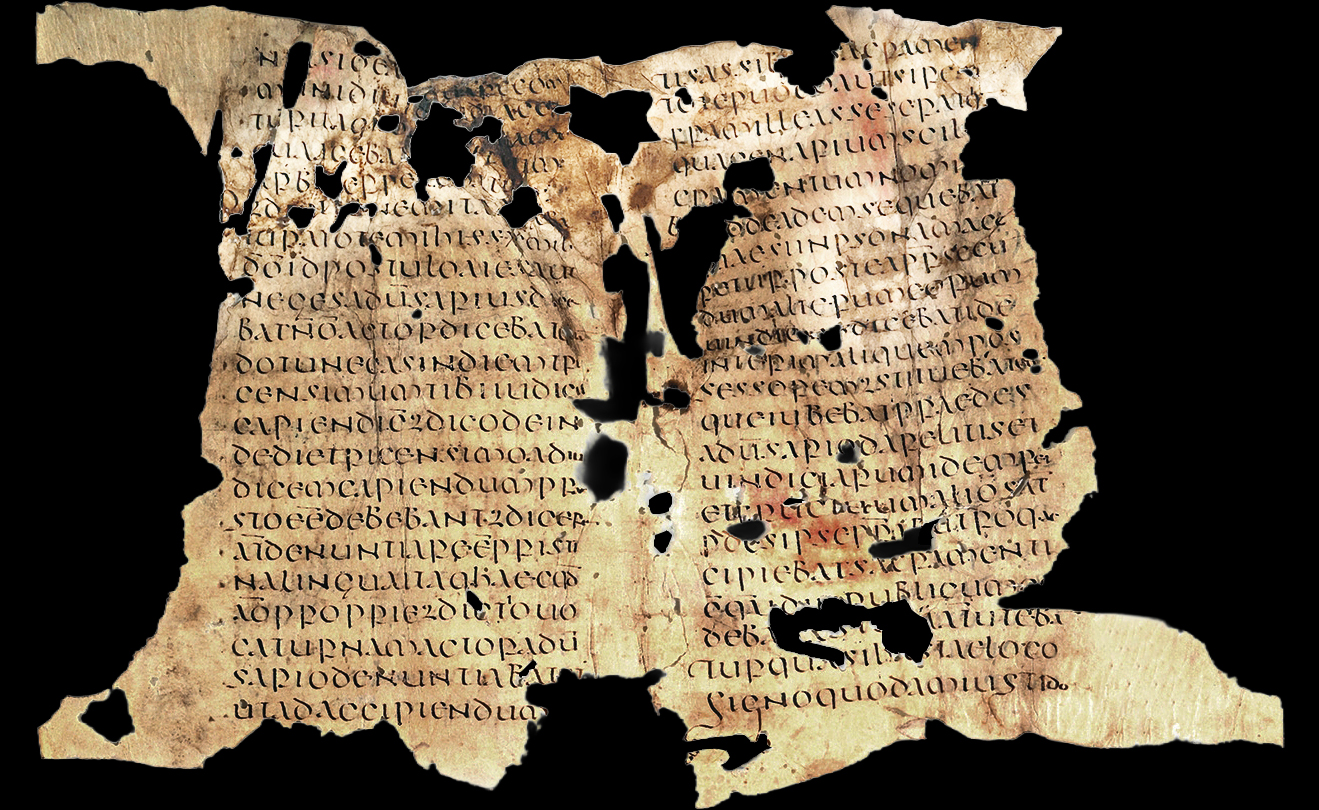
P.Oxy.XVII 2103 and PSI XI, 1182 contain parts of book IV of the Institutes

The authenticity of the text of the Codex Veronensis was later confirmed by the discovery of further fragments of the Institutes: In 1927, a fragment of the Institutes was found in Oxyrhynchus on papyrus scrolls, which are believed to have been written between about 170 and 230 AD (P.Oxy.XVII 2103. A further fragment was located in 1933 and bought by Medea Norsa in Cairo in the same year (PSI XI, 1182); the seller claimed that the fragment stemmed from Antinoöpolis. A comparison of the fragment with the Codex Veronensis established the firm consistency of the Institutes.

=== Indirect transmission ===
The work of Gaius has also been indirectly handed down to modern times, as it was frequently used as a model for various legal writings during the 5th and 6th centuries. The so-called Augustodunensian manuscript provides relatively little insight into the text. The late antique manuscripts of the Mosaicarum et Romanarum legum collatio and the so-called Epitome Gai (contained as part 3 [liber Gaii] of the Lex Romana Visigothorum of Alaric II) attained greater importance for research. The influences of Gaius also found their way into the Digesta and the Institutiones Iustiniani, which together with the Codex Justinianus and the Novellae formed the Corpus Juris Civilis, the collection with which the Eastern Roman emperor Justinian restated Roman law in the 6th century.

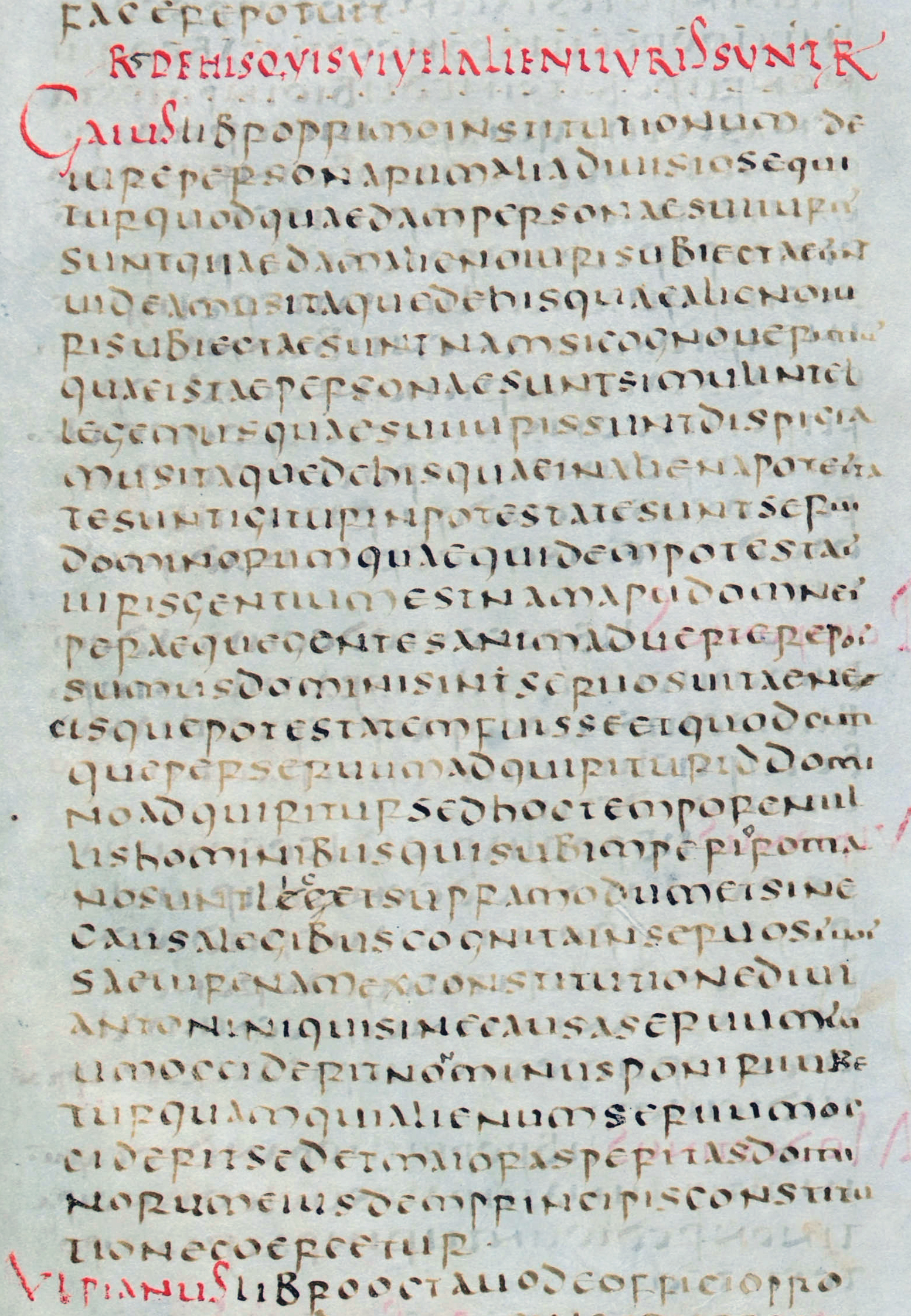
Digest 1.6.1 (Littera Florentina) quoting Gaius' Institutes

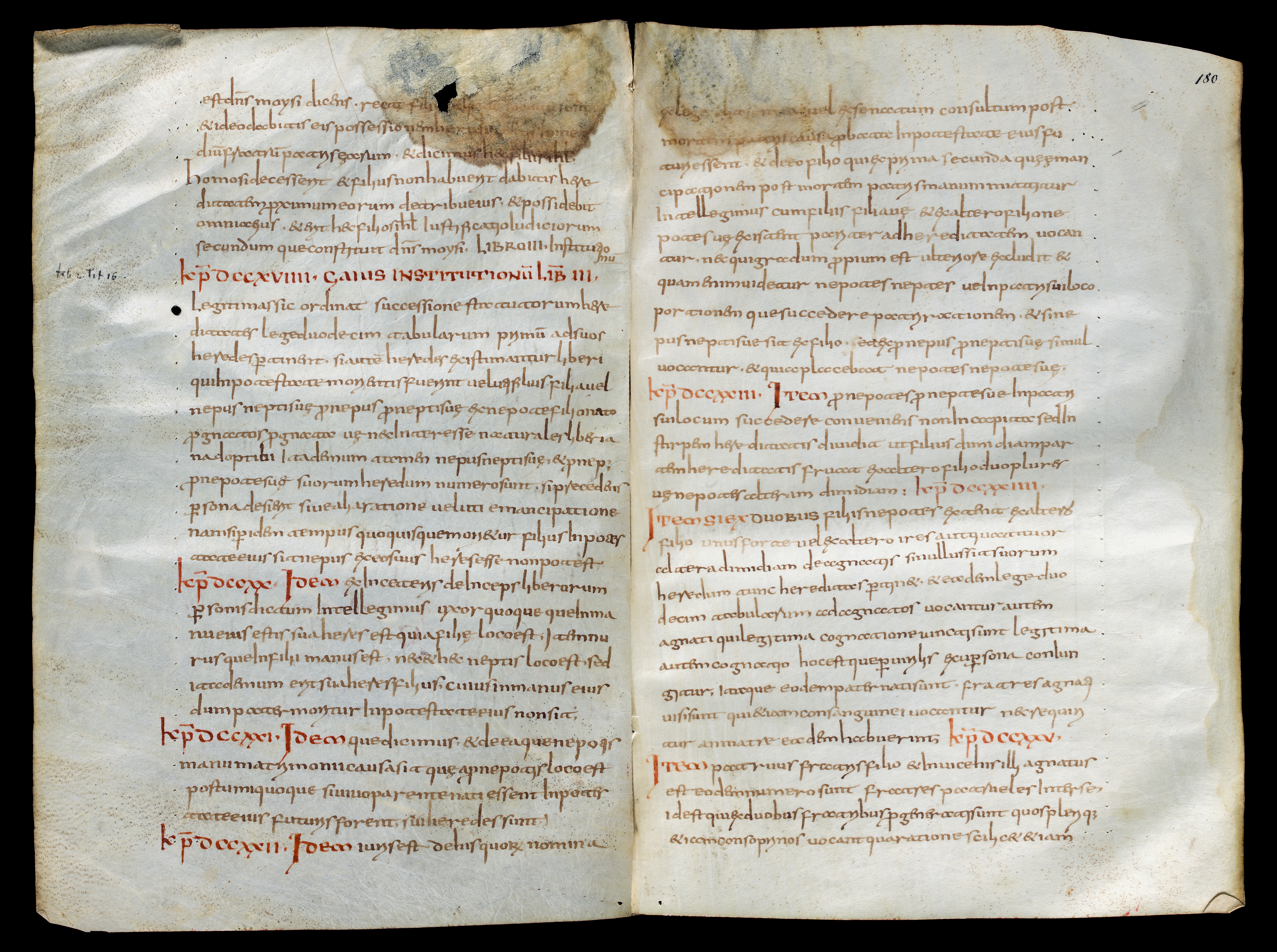
The Mosaicarum et Romanarum legum collatio quoting Gaius' Institutes

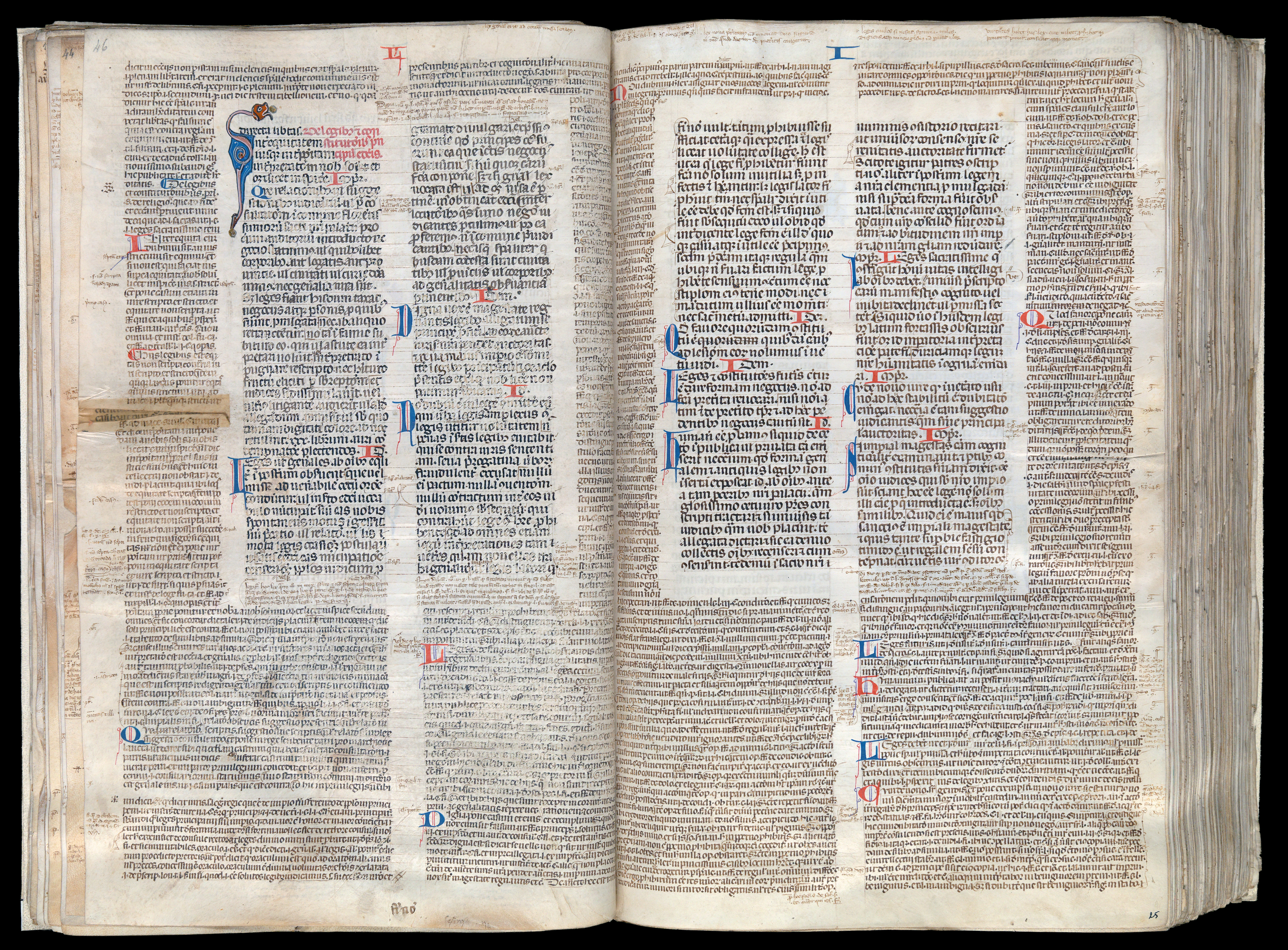
13th-century manuscript of Justinian's Corpus Juris Civilis – frequently citing Gaius' Institutes – with the glossa ordinaria by Accursius on the margins

== Significance and authorship ==
=== Significance ===
The Institutes were produced around 161 AD under Roman emperor Antoninus Pius as a didactic work. In Der kleine Pauly, they are described by the German legal scholar Theo Mayer-Maly as "by far the most influential elementary-systematic presentation of Roman private law in late antiquity, the Middle Ages and modern times". Some consider Gaius and his Institutes to be the "true architect of Justinian's collection". Justinian himself described him as "Gaius noster" ('our Gaius').

The Institutes are also distinguished by the fact that they are the only almost completely preserved work of classical Roman jurisprudence. Before the discovery of the Codex Veronensis by Niebuhr, knowledge about classical Roman jurisprudence was only indirect through Justinian's compilation and classical Roman civil procedure had been entirely unknown.

The didactic value of the Institutes as a textbook has been seen positively because of its apparent comprehensibility and simplicity. Theo Mayer-Maly argued that Gaius' legal thinking is "much closer to the dogmatic tradition of continental [European] jurisprudence (i.e. the striving for systems, the effort to form concepts and to classify, and the tendency towards abstraction) than the method of any other ancient jurist".

=== Authorship ===
The extent to which the Institutes have been written by Gaius alone, and what part of them, if any, are glosses or interpolations, is still only subject to scholarly speculation. However, scholars agree on the enormous significance of the (re-)discovery of the Institutes since "numerous legal institutions that the Justinianic commission left unmentioned as obsolete are known only through the new find".

== Structure, content and influence ==
=== Structure and content of the Institutes ===
The Institutes are divided into four books: The first book deals with persons and family law (personae), the second and third book deal with things (res), while the last book considers civil procedure (actiones). The Institutes only deal with private and not criminal law. They begin with a brief description of the sources of Roman law (G. Inst. 1.1–1.7). Gaius writes in translation of Edward Poste:

§ 1 Omnes populi qui legibus et moribus reguntur, partim suo proprio, partim communi omnium hominum iure utuntur; nam quod quisque populus ipse sibi ius constituit, id ipsius proprium est uocaturque ius ciuile, quasi ius proprium ciuitatis; quod uero naturalis ratio inter omnes homines constituit, id apud omnes populos peraeque custoditur uocaturque ius gentium, quasi quo iure omnes gentes utuntur. populus itaque Romanus partim suo proprio, partim communi omnium hominum iure utitur. quae singula qualia sint, suis locis proponemus.

§ 1 The laws of every people governed by statutes and customs are partly peculiar to itself, partly common to all mankind. The rules established by a given state for its own members are peculiar to itself, and are called jus civile; the rules constituted by natural reason for all are observed by all nations alike, and are called jus gentium. So the laws of the people of Rome are partly peculiar to itself, partly common to all nations; and this distinction shall be explained in detail in each place as it occurs.

— Gaius, Institutes, 1.1

The first book of the Institutes classifies persons in three distinct ways: Firstly, free men, slaves and freedmen (G. Inst. 1.9–1.47); secondly persons, who are subject to another person (personae in potestate, manu, mancipio; G. Inst. 1.48–1.141), and thirdly persons who are subject to tutela (in tutela) or cura (G. Inst. 1.142–1.200).

The second book on things (res) begins with a list of things which cannot be subject to private property rights, namely res sacrae, religiosae, sanctae and publicae; (G. Inst. 2.1–11), before things, which can be subject to such rights, are categorized (G. Inst. 2.12–18). Then, the acquisition of things and obligations is extensively dealt with (G. Inst. 2.19–96). Finally, the second book concludes with an overview of parts of Roman inheritance law (G. Inst. 2.97–289), especially testamentary succession.

The exposition of Roman inheritance law continues in the third book (G. Inst. 3.1–87), mainly dealing with intestacy (G. Inst. 3.1–76). Then, the law of obligations (obligationes) is presented and divided into contractual (ex contractu; G. Inst. 3.89–181) and tortious obligations (ex delicto; G. Inst. 3.182–225), including furtum. Gaius does not deal with quasi-contracts and quasi-delicts in his Institutes.

The last book gives an overview of 2nd century Roman civil procedure in 187 sections.

=== Influence on later civil codes ===
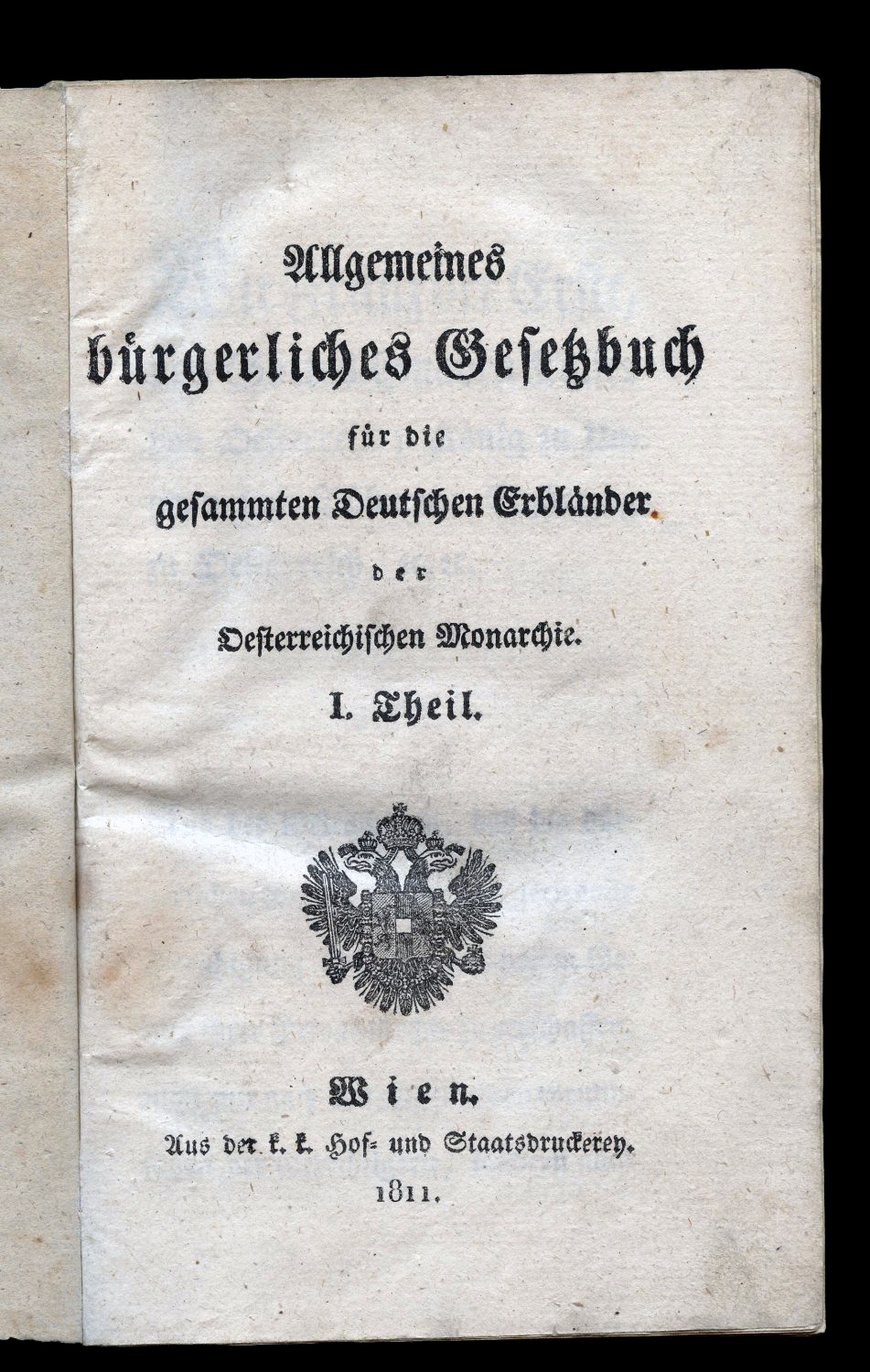
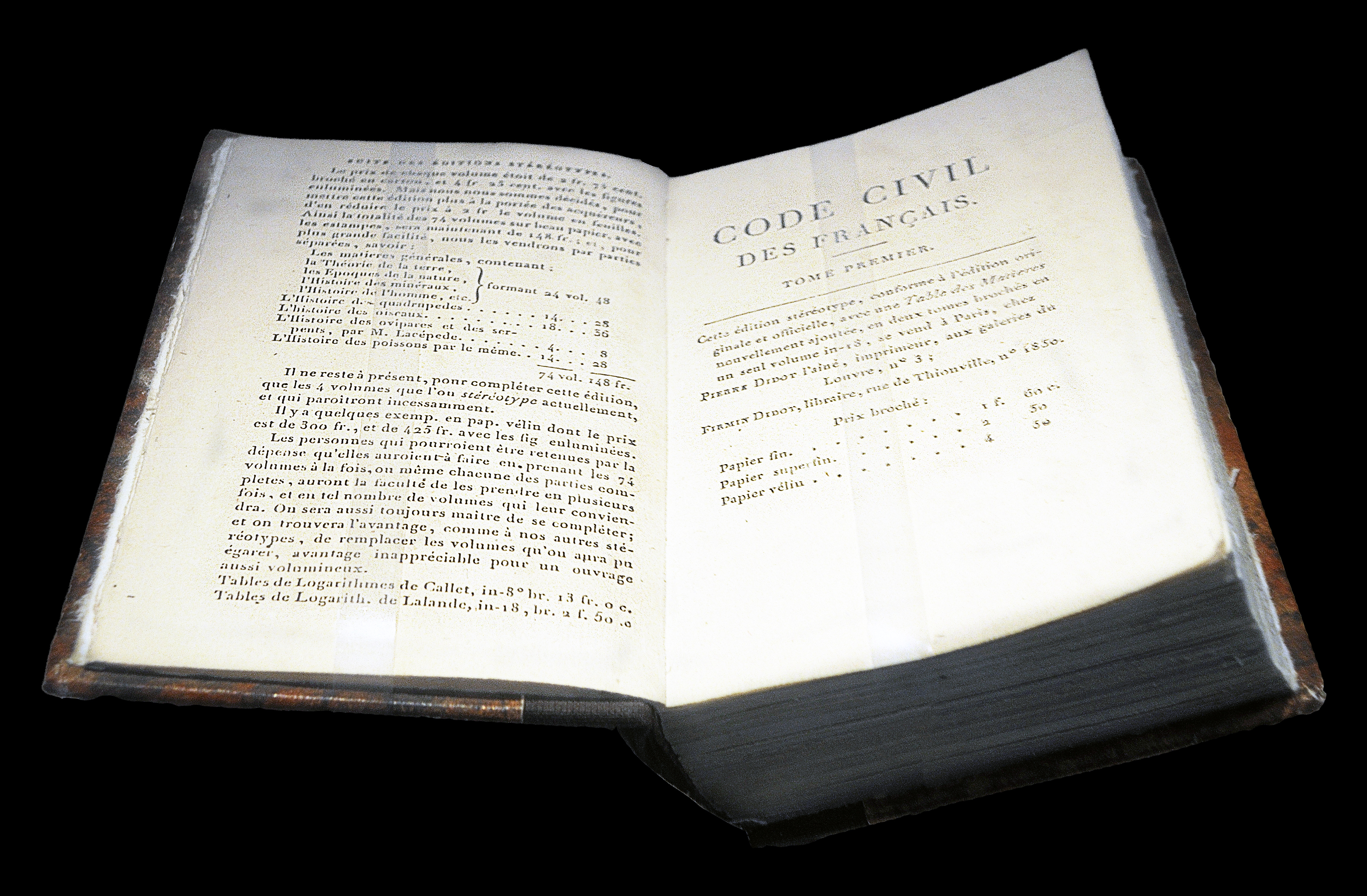
The ABGB and the Code Napoléon have been influenced by Gaius' institutes

The structure of the Institutes – namely the structuring of private law into personae, res and actiones – has become known as the institutional scheme. This classification scheme, probably borrowed from the Hellenistic textbook pattern, replaced and leveled previous structures and became a basic model followed by many modern civil law systems. For example, the Austrian Allgemeines bürgerliches Gesetzbuch (ABGB) is still structured according to the institutional system, in contrast to the German Bürgerliches Gesetzbuch (BGB), which follows the pandectistic system. Furthermore, the structure of the Institutes was a model for the Castilian Siete Partidas, the French Code Napoléon and even the Corpus Juris Canonici.

== Citing the Institutes ==
In academic literature, the Institutes are sometimes cited as "Gai. 1,1" (referring to book 1, section 1 of the Institutes), while other authors prefer "Gai. inst. 4,44" (referring to book 4, section 44 of the Institutes). The Bluebook recommends the following citation style: "G. Inst. 1.144" (referring to book 1, section 144 of the Institutes).

== Editions ==
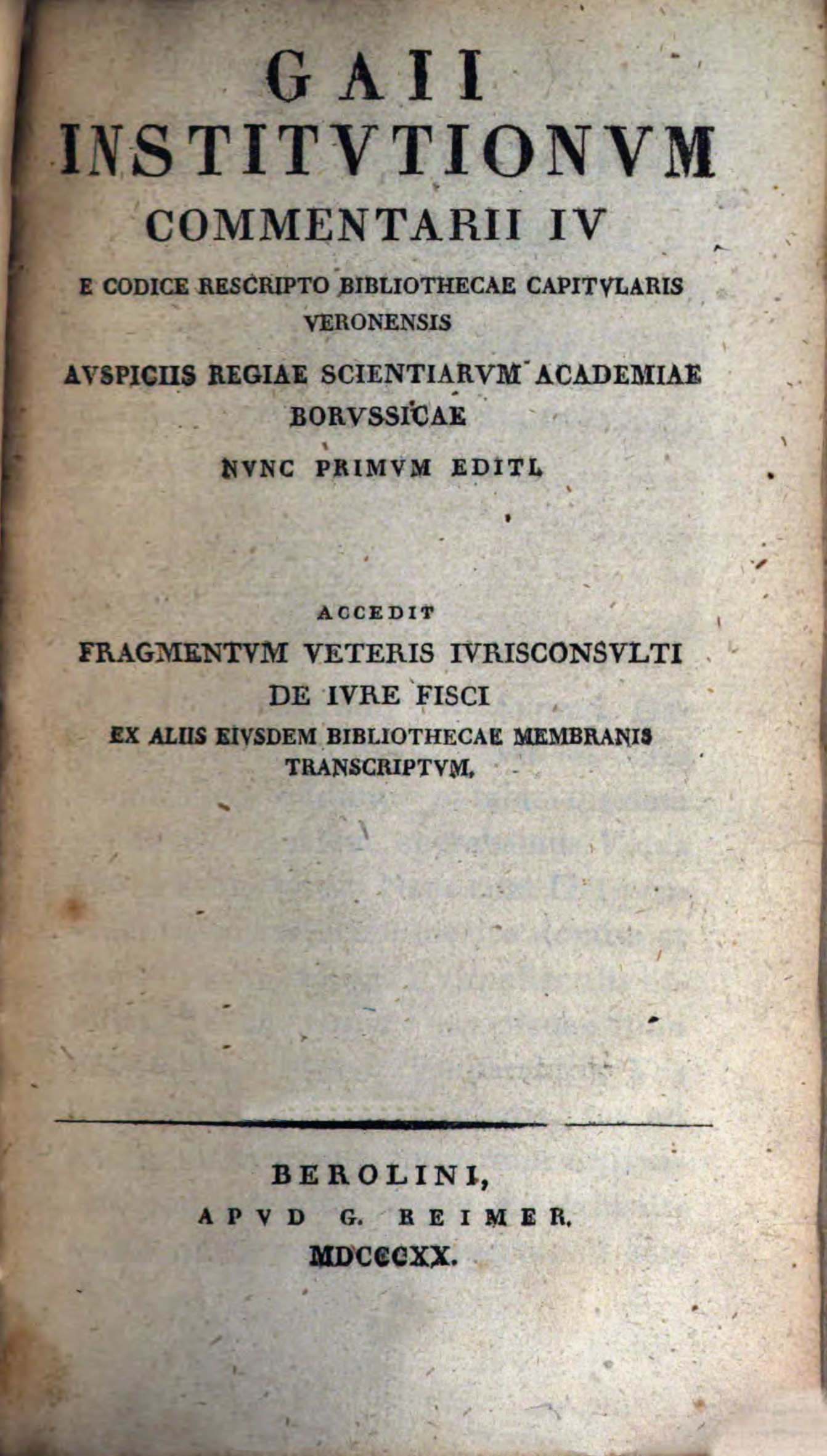
The title page of the 1820 editio princeps of the Institutes

Multiple editions of the Institutes have been published since the discovery of the Codex Veronensis, beginning with the editio princeps of Johann Friedrich Ludwig Göschen (Berlin, 1820). The author of the 1911 Encyclopædia Britannica recommends the 1885 edition by Edward Poste, which includes an English translation.

The editio maior, the major critical edition, of the Institutes is, however, still in the process of being published. It is edited by Martin David and Hein L. W. Nelson (Gai Institutionum commentarii quattuor: 1954, 1960, 1968 [books 1 and 2]) and Hein L. W. Nelson and Ulrich Manthe (Gai Institutiones: 1992, 1999, 2007 [book 3]).

Other editions include one by Emil Seckel and Bernhard Kübler (8th edition, Leipzig, 1939) and Francis de Zulueta, which contains Zulueta's own Latin text with an English translation and commentary (Oxford, 1946).

- Göschen, Johann Friedrich Ludwig, ed. (1820). Gaii Institutionum commentarii IV. Berlin: Reimer. [Editio princeps]
- Poste, Edward, ed. (1884). Gaii Institutionum Iuris Civilis Commentarii Quattuor Or Elements of Roman Law by Gaius (2 ed.). Oxford: Clarendon Press.
- Poste, Edward; Whittuck, E. A., eds. (1904). Gaii Institutionum Iuris Civilis Commentarii Quattuor Or Elements of Roman Law by Gaius (PDF) (4 ed.). Oxford: Clarendon Press. [Contains an English translation]
- Seckel, Emil; Kübler, Bernhard, eds. (1939). Gai Institutiones (8 ed.). Lipsiae.
- De Zulueta, Francis, ed. (1946). The Institutes of Gaius: Text with critical notes and translation. Vol. I. Oxford: Clarendon Press. [Contains an English translation]
- De Zulueta, Francis, ed. (1953). The Institutes of Gaius Part 2: Commentary. Vol. II. Oxford: Clarendon Press.
- Gordon, William M.; Robinson, Olivia F., eds. (1988). The Institutes of Gaius. Translated with an Introduction; with the Latin Text of Seckel and Kuebler. London: Duckworth. OCLC 60048667. [Contains an English translation]
- Manthe, Ulrich, ed. (2004). Gaius Institutiones. Texte zur Forschung. Vol. 81. Darmstadt: Wissenschaftliche Buchgesellschaft. ISBN 978-3-534-17474-4. [Contains a German translation]
