= Azzo =

Azzo (Italian) or Azzus (Latin) are variations of the same name. Azo, Atto, and Hatto are other variants.

- Albert Azzo I, Margrave of Milan, Italian nobleman
- Albert Azzo II, Margrave of Milan (died 1097), Italian nobleman, founder of Casa d'Este
- Azzo V d'Este
- Azzo VI d'Este (1170–1212), Italian nobleman and condottiero
- Azzo VII d'Este (1205–1264), Marquis of Ferrara
- Azzo VIII d'Este (died 1308), Lord of Ferrara, Modena and Reggio
- Azzo X d'Este (1344–1415), Italian condottiero
- Azzo Alidosi (died 1372), Italian condottiero
- Azo of Bologna (Azzo/Azzone) (fl. 1150–1230), medieval jurist
- Azzone Visconti (1302–1339), Lord of Milan from 1329 until his death
- Pet name for Salvino Azzopardi (1931–2006), S.J. Maltese priest and philosopher
