= Glossa ordinaria (Accursius) =

Collection of annotations to the Corpus Iuris Civilis by Accursius

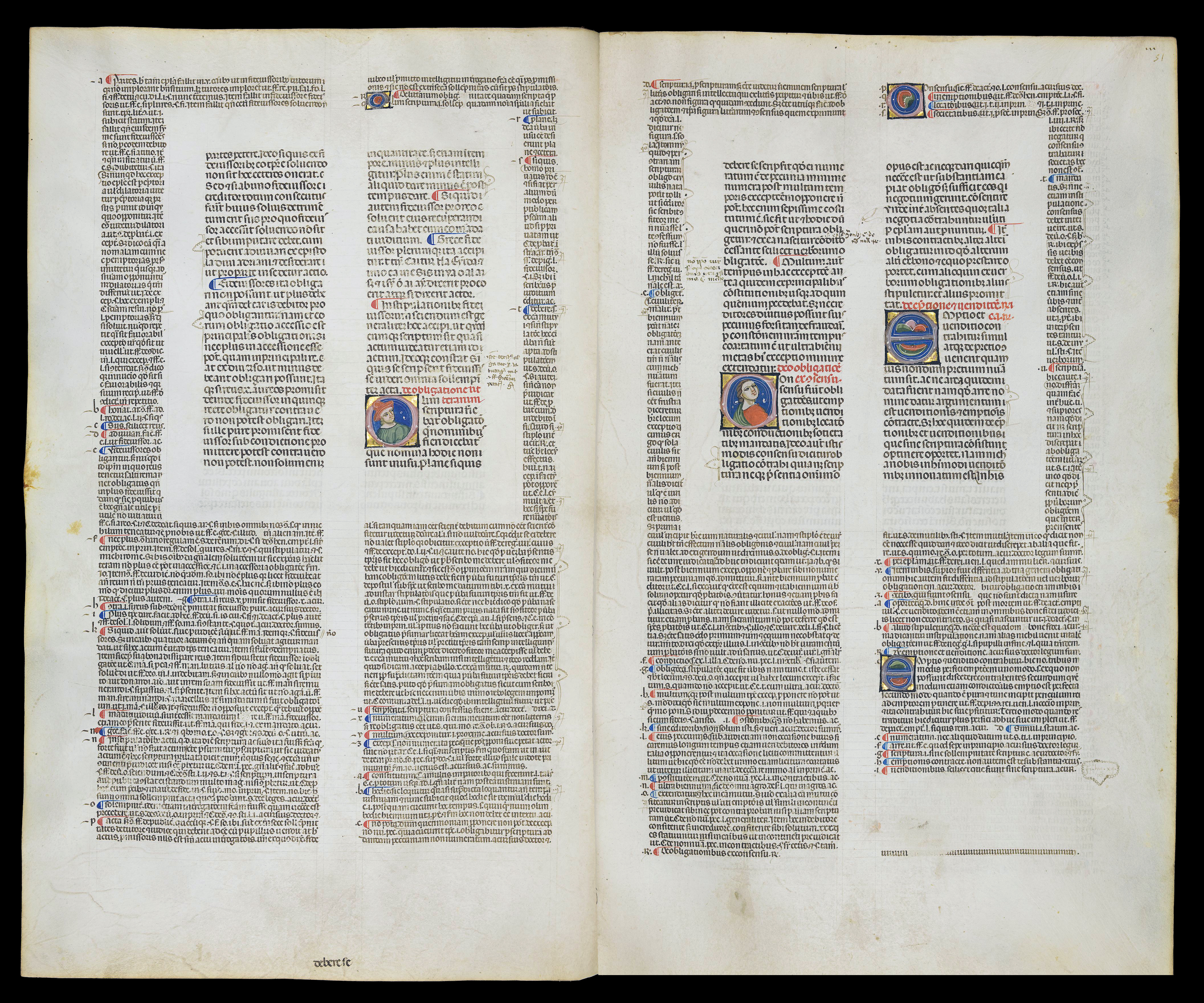
- Excerpt from a 13th-century manuscript of the Institutiones Iustiniani with the Glossa ordinaria by Accursius on the margins (held in the Vatican Apostolic Library)
- Author: Accursius
- Language: Latin
- Subject: Corpus Iuris Civilis
- Published: c. 1250 (as a manuscript), 1476 (as a book [an incunable])
- Media type: Gloss

The Glossa ordinaria (also known as Glossa magna, Glossa magistralis and Glossa accursiana) is a collection of 96,940 marginal annotations (glossa marginalis) in Latin by the Italian jurist Accursius (c. 1181/1185–1259/1263) on the Corpus Iuris Civilis, a collection of Roman law by the Byzantine emperor Justinian I (r. 527–565). The name Glossa ordinaria refers to fact that the gloss by Accursius was the "ordinary" or "standard" gloss on the Corpus Iuris Civilis.

Modern scholarship contends that the Glossa ordinaria maintained its authoritative status as leading commentary on the Corpus Iuris Civilis in Europe up to the 17th century, which is signified by the adage "Quidquid non agnoscit Glossa, non agnoscit curia" (lit. 'Whatever the Gloss does not recognize, the court does not recognize').

== Author, development and usage ==
=== Author ===
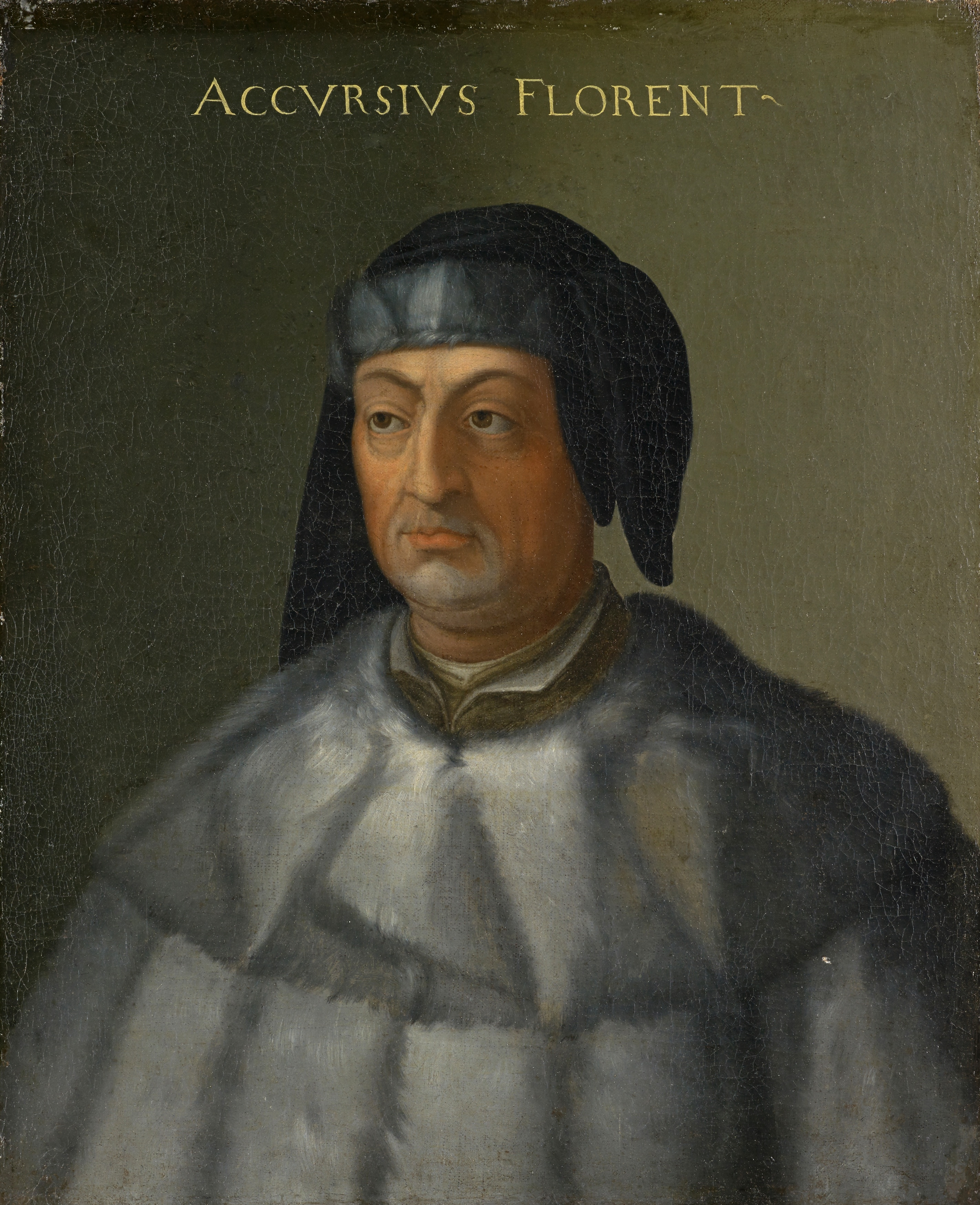
Portrait of Accursius by Cristofano dell'Altissimo

Accursius (c. 1181/1185 – c. 1259/1263) was an Italian jurist born near Florence who studied at the University of Bologna under Azo and Jacobus Balduinus. Some time before 1220, he started teaching law at this university. He was highly regarded for his teaching and became rich – his large palace in Bologna is now part of the Palazzo d'Accursio. Some scholars contend that he participated in extortionate transactions with students and accepted gifts during examination procedures.

Accursius was part of the school of glossators in Bologna, who annotated the Corpus Iuris Civilis with glossa interlinearis ('interlinear gloss') or glossa marginalis ('marginal gloss') and made this Byzantine law collection of the 6th century practical and useful for the circumstances and needs of Europe in the 13th century.

=== Development ===
Accursius' work on the Glossa ordinaria probably started in the 1220s, continued for several decades, and was probably completed around 1250. It is generally believed that he glossed the Institutiones first, but other details about his process of composition are unknown. The material for the Glossa ordinaria was gathered from earlier commentary by Azo, Hugolianus and Johannes Bassianus; Accursius likely also used commentary by Odofredus, Symon Vincentius and Jacobus Balduinus.

The Glossa ordinaria was the last of the glosses by the glossators. In the view of the legal scholar Robert Figueira, it "provide[s] an unsurpassed and exact reference to parallel and contrary texts within Corpus Iuris Civilis, and it absorbed, summarized, and perpetuated the work of many important earlier glossators for posterity".

== Content ==
=== Overview ===
The Glossa ordinaria differs from earlier glossatorial work only in its completeness and its size; it is the largest of the glosses. It consists of 96,940 separate marginal annotations (glossae) to all parts of the Corpus Iuris Civilis and the Libri Feudorum, which were compiled by the glossators. The Glossa ordinaria contains about 2,000,000 words.

- 62,577 annotations concern the Digesta.
- 21,933 annotations concern the Codex Iustinianus.
- 7,013 annotations concern the Authentica (without Codex books 10–12).
- 4,737 annotations concern the Institutiones.
- 680 annotations concern the Libri Feudorum.

The Glossa ordinaria uses various sigla to clarify which author is used as the authority for a specific marginal annotation. The referenced authorities are Azo (3,879 references), Johannes Bassianus (1,850 references), Hugolinus (1,030 references), Rogerius (920 references), Martinus (590 references), Placentinus (520 references), Irnerius (330 references), Bulgarus (315 references), Albericus (230 references), Pillius (165 references), Jacobus (30 references) and Hugo (10 references). Unusually for legal glosses, the Glossa ordinaria also references Canon law, if sparsely: The Decretum Gratiani is cited 260 times, while Papal decretals are cited 125 times.

=== Example ===
To illustrate what a gloss of the Glossa ordinaria is, the following example is provided: Within the Corpus Iuris Civilis, Dig. 47.11.4, states: "The deified Severus and Antoninus [Caracalla] issued a rescript stating that a woman who obtained an abortion (abegit) should be sent into temporary exile (exilium) by the governor. For it would seem shameful for her to have defrauded her husband of children with impunity." (Note: Latin: Marcianus libro primo regularum. Divus Severus et Antoninus rescripserunt eam, quae data opera abegit, a praeside in temporale exilium dandam: indignum enim videri potest impune eam maritum liberis fraudasse.) Accursius' gloss on this sentence is as follows:

sv. abegit: "that is, to have an abortion"; and v. exilium: "before the fortieth day [from conception, the woman cannot be held liable for homicide], since beforehand the [fetus] was not yet a human being, while afterwards she can be held liable for homicide according to Mosaic Law or according to the lex Lege Pompeia on parricide, as in Dig. 48. 9. 1, Cod. 9. 16. 7(8), and Dig. 48. 8. 8."

— Accursius

== Historical usage and modern recognition ==
=== Historical usage ===
Accursius' Glossa was immediately adopted for teaching and legal practise in Italy. It superseded the previous glosses, and lawyers after 1250 rarely attempted new glosses. According to the legal scholar Robert Figueira, the popularity and usefulness of the Glossa ordinaria rests on the completeness of its analysis of the Corpus Iuris Civilis and Accursius' ability to avoid contradictions within the Corpus Iuris Civilis. He stated that all contradictions could be resolved ("omnia contraria possunt solvi").

The Glossa ordinaria was widely used in Italy from the second half of the 13th century onwards. In Northern Italy, it held a dominant position in legal practise and during the 15th century it was still the starting point for Italian legal inquiry. In France, it was not as well received, but still known. In Germany, the Glossa ordinaria was known since the end of the 13th century. Its enduring influence is signified by the adage "Quidquid non agnoscit Glossa, non agnoscit curia" (lit. 'Whatever the Gloss does not recognize, the court does not recognize'), which was coined in 17th century Germany. In Spain, it heavily influenced the Siete Partidas, while it even held formal legal value in Portugal under the Alfonsine Ordinances. Modern scholarship argues that the Glossa ordinaria maintained its authoritative status in Europe up to the 17th century.

=== Modern recognition ===
The modern recognition of the Glossa ordinaria differs: In the 19th century, the leading German jurist Friedrich Carl von Savigny, was critical of the work. He argued that Accursius was a "collector without judgment" ("urtheilsloser Sammler"), nevertheless acknowledging that the Glossa ordinaria was of similar value for later centuries as the Corpus Iuris Civilis itself ("[...] muss der Glosse des Accursius ein ähnliches Verdienst für spätere Zeitalter zugeschrieben werden, wie den Rechtssammlungen Justinians"). Afterwards, a more positive reception prevailed. Otto von Gierke, a German jurist and historian of the 19th and 20th century, noted that the Glossa ordinaria "remains the starting point of modern jurisprudence". An evaluation of the work by the German legal scholar Horst Heinrich Jakobs in 2017 says:

To his and his work's character – there will hardly be anything more to say about Accursius here. He was a man whom it would be ridiculous to call "industrious". He was a man of almost inexhaustible productivity, of comprehensive knowledge of the details of all libri legales, endowed with a sense of order that is hard to match, with an almost unerring judgement of the quality of former glosses, an editor of glosses of the highest perfection. (Note: German: Zu dessen und seiner Arbeit Charakter – zu Accursius wird hier kaum noch etwas zu sagen sein. Er war ein Mann, den "fleißig" zu nennen lächerlich wäre. Er war ein Mann von schier unerschöpflicher Arbeitskraft, von umfassender Kenntnis des Details aller libri legales, ausgestattet mit einem Ordnungssinn, der seinesgleichen schwerlich finden wird, mit einem, was die in seinen Vorlagen vorhandene Qualität betrifft, fast untrüglichen Urteilsvermögen, ein Redaktor der Glosse von höchster Perfektion.)

— Horst Heinrich Jakobs

== Editions ==
=== Manuscripts ===
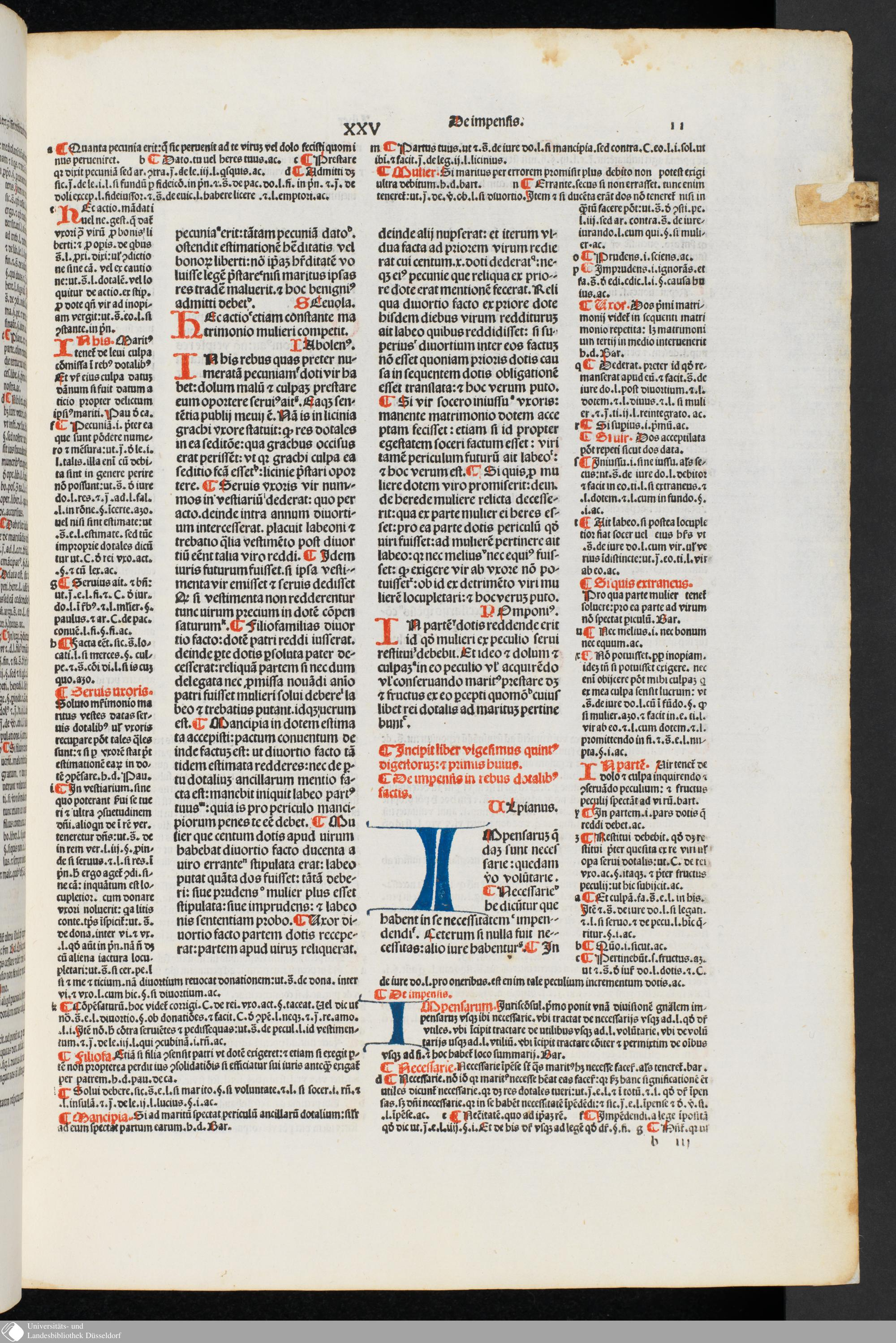
A page of a 1495 print of the Digestum infortiatum (Note: The Digestum infortiatum contains book 24, title 3, to book 38 of the Digesta.) with the Glossa ordinaria of Accursius and the Summaria of Hieronymus Clarius in the margins

Around 1,200 manuscripts of the Corpus Iuris Civilis with the Glossa ordinaria in the margins are known. On some manuscripts, a previous gloss was erased so that the Glossa ordinaria could be copied into the margins instead.

=== Printings ===
No modern critical edition of the Glossa ordinaria exists. The first print of the gloss was done in Mainz in 1476. Another printed edition was produced in Venice in five parts in 1487–1489. This incunable edition was reprinted as a facsimile in Turin by Ex Officina Erasmiana as part of the Corpus Glossatorum Iuris Civilis (CGIC) series (volumes 7–11) in 1968 and 1969.

The individual volumes of the reprinting and the original incunable are:

Corpus Glossatorum Iuris Civilis (CGIC) VII–XI and the reproduced 1487–1489 incunable printings
CGIC Volume	CGIC title	Corpus Iuris Civilis	Original printing	Original printing reference numbers	Original printing online version	Ref.
VII	Accursii Glossa in Digestum vetus, 1969 (OCLC 123217764)	Digestum vetus (Dig. 1.1–24.2) (Note: The Digestum vetus contains books 1 to 24, title 2, of the Digesta.)	Venice: Baptista de Tortis, 4 August 1488	GW 7667 | ISTC ij00550000 | BSB-Ink C-604	BSB	
VIII	Accursii Glossa in Digestum infortiatum, 1968 (OCLC 4458578)	Infortiatum (Dig. 24.3–38)	Venice: Baptista de Tortis, 8 April 1488	ISTC ij00557500 | BSB-Ink C-617	BSB	
IX	Accursii Glossa in Digestum novum, 1968 (OCLC 4458604)	Digestum novum (Dig. 39–50) (Note: The Digestum novum contains books 39 to 50 of the Digesta.)	Venice: Baptista de Tortis, 9 January 1487/88	ISTC ij00569600 | BSB-Ink C-588	BSB	
X	Accursii Glossa in Codicem, 1968 (OCLC 4458652)	Codex (Cod. 1–9)	Venice: Baptista de Tortis, 8 December 1488	ISTC ij00581500 | BSB-Ink C-569	—	
XI	Accursii Glossa in Volumen, 1969 (OCLC 4458678)	Institutiones	Venice: Baptista de Tortis, 1 July 1489	ISTC ij00532000 | BSB-Ink C-654	BSB	
XI	Accursii Glossa in Volumen, 1969 (OCLC 4458678)	Authenticum (Nov.) | Tres libri (Cod. 10–12) | Libri Feudorum | Extravagantes	Venice: Baptista de Tortis, 7 May 1489	BSB-Ink C-552	BSB	

== See also ==
- Cuius est solum, eius est usque ad coelum et ad inferos – a principle of property law principle traced back to the Glossa by Accursius (note to Dig. 8.2.1)
