= Pepo =

Pepo may refer to:

- Pepo (botany), a modified berry with a hard outer rind, typical of cucurbits such as cucumbers and melons
  - Pepo Mill., a synonym of the genus Cucurbita
- Pepo (ethnology), Plains Indigenous peoples in Taiwan
- Pepo (jurist), an 11th-century law teacher at the University of Bologna
- Pepo (cartoonist), born René Ríos Boettiger, a Chilean cartoonist, who used Pepo as a pseudonym
- PEPO Lappeenranta, a Finnish football club
- Pepo (film), a 1935 Armenian film made by Hamo Beknazarian
- Pepo Frick (born 1952), Liechtenstein politician
- Nickname of Susilo Bambang Yudhoyono
