= Hatto =

Hatto may refer to:

- Hattō, Tottori, a town in Japan
- Hatto (Suiton) (はっと), a variation of the Japanese dish Suiton

== People ==
=== Mononym or given name ===
- Hatto or Hetto, Archbishop of Trier (814–847)
- Hatto I (c. 850–913), German Roman Catholic bishop
- Hatto II (died 970), German Roman Catholic bishop
- Hatto, Bishop of Passau (fl. 806–817) German Roman Catholic bishop
- Hatto of Fulda, abbot of Fulda between 842 and 856; see Candidus of Fulda
- Haito (763–after 824), German Roman Catholic bishop
- Hatto Ständer (1929–2000), German musician and composer

=== Surname ===
- Arthur Thomas Hatto (1910–2010), English scholar of German studies and husband of Margot Hatto
- Jeanne Hatto (1879–1958), French operatic soprano
- Joyce Hatto (1928–2006), British pianist
- Margot Hatto (1911–2000), German business owner and wife of Arthur Thomas Hatto
- Tommy Hatto, British actor
