= Athanasios of Emesa =

Athanasios of Emesa (Ἀθανάσιος ὁ Ἐμεσαῖος/Ἐμεσηνός; Emesa is now Homs in Syria) was a Byzantine jurist living in the 6th century. Coming from the first generation of jurists to practice after Justinian completed the codification of Roman law, he worked as a teacher of law, rhetor and advocate.

His principal work is the Syntagma (572-77), a practical lawyer's edition of the Novellae in which he orders the Novellae into 22 titles and pioneers the use of paratitla, footnote-like references to other sources. Highly popular in its day, the Syntagma vanished from practical use together with the Novellae during the 7th century.
