= Azo of Bologna =

Italian jurist (fl. 1150–1230)

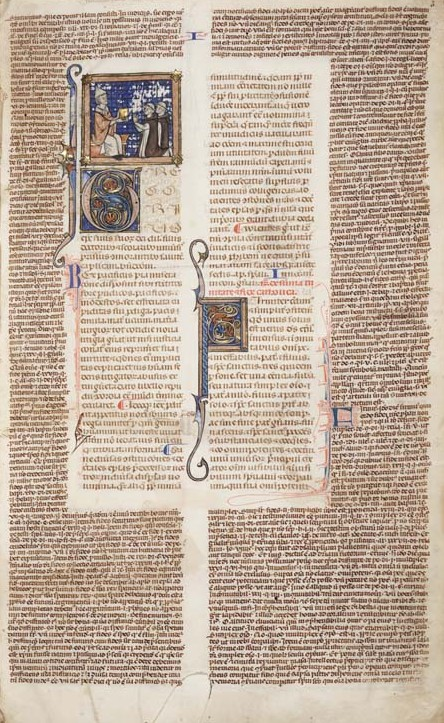
Decretals with Glossa ordinaria

Azo of Bologna or Azzo or Azolenus (fl. 1150–1230) was an influential Italian jurist and a member of the school of the so-called glossators. Born circa 1150 in Bologna, Azo studied under Joannes Bassianus and became professor of civil law at Bologna. He was a teacher of Franciscus Accursius. He is sometimes known as Azo Soldanus, from his father's surname, and also Azzo Porcius (dei Porci), to distinguish him from later famous Italians named Azzo. He died circa 1230.

Azo wrote glosses on all parts of the Corpus Iuris Civilis. His most influential work is his Summa Codicis, a commentary of the civil law organized according to the order of Justinian's Code. The Summa Codicis, and Apparatus ad codicem, collected by his pupil, Alessandro de Santo Aegidio, and amended by Hugolinus and Odofredus, formed a methodical exposition of Roman law. As one of the very few medieval legal texts in Latin, the Summa Codicis has been translated into Old French.

== Biography ==
Azo studied civil law in his native city, Bologna, under the glossator Johannes Bassianus, and was teaching there by 1190 at the latest. The legists Accursius, Bernardus Dorna, and Roffredus de Epiphanio, the feudalist Jacobus de Ardizone, and the canonists Geoffrey of Trani and Johannes Teutonicus (author of the Glossa ordinaria) were all Azo’s students. He was also active as an adviser and legal expert in public and private matters. Azo was renowned for his Summae Codicis, Institutionum, and Digestorum, which in their second editions became the long-standard handbook of the European common law (there were thirty-five printed editions between 1481 and 1610). Like the older glossator Placentinus (who died in 1192), Azo wrote summae both to the Institutes and to the Codex and, in an outright bid to trump Placentinus, a summa on those titles in the Digest not covered in the Codex or the Institutes. His magna opera, however, were gloss apparatuses to all parts of the Corpus Juris. Azo furthermore wrote his “great apparatuses” to the first part of the Digesta, the Digestum vetus, and books 1 through 9 of the Codex, in which he discussed matters more extensively than had previous writers. None of these was ever printed, since by the fifteenth century the apparatuses of Accursius had long since taken the field and been accepted as the Glossa ordinaria. Somewhat by accident, however, Azo’s lectures on the Codex, taken down and fleshed out by his student Alexander de Sancto Aegidio, did appear in print. Azo also wrote a commentary to the Digest title De regulis iuris as well as a book of distinctions, neither of them printed. He put together a collection of brocardica (from the medieval Latin broccus, “with protruding teeth”—this is what the Bolognese law students called arguments employed in disputation and in general for the resolution of legal conundrums); he also composed a book of Quaestiones, cases with their resolutions.

== Legacy ==
Azo's works enjoyed great authority among generations of continental lawyers, such that it used to be said, Chi non ha Azzo, non vada al palazzo, roughly translated: "Who hasn't Azo on his side, will not go to court," neither as a plaintiff nor as judge. Azo's Summa Codicis, was also used (and often copied verbatim) by Henry Bracton in his account of English law. Azo's many glosses were ultimately incorporated into the Great Gloss of his pupil, Accursius. The legal historian Frederic William Maitland edited Select Passages from the Works of Bracton and Azo.

== Works ==
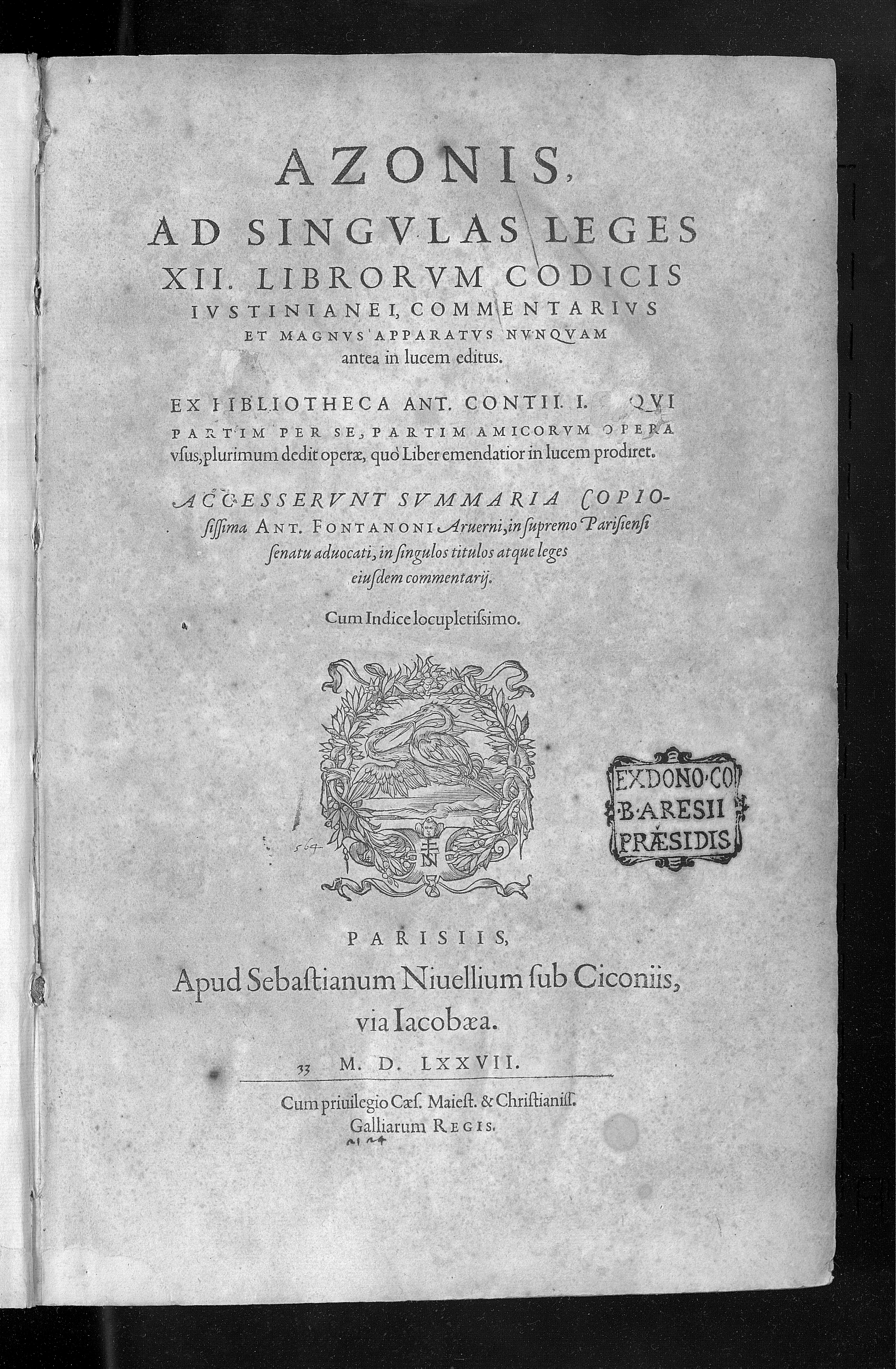
Ad singulas leges XII librorum Codicis Iustinianei commentarius, 1577

- Summa Codicis
- Lectura
  - Ad singulas leges XII librorum Codicis Iustinianei commentarius (in Latin). Paris: Sébastien Nivelle. 1577.
- Glossae
- Brocardica

== See also ==
- Codex Justinianeus
