= Corpus Juris Civilis =

Collection of legal works codified by Justinian I of Byzantium

Body of Civil Law Corpus Juris Civilis
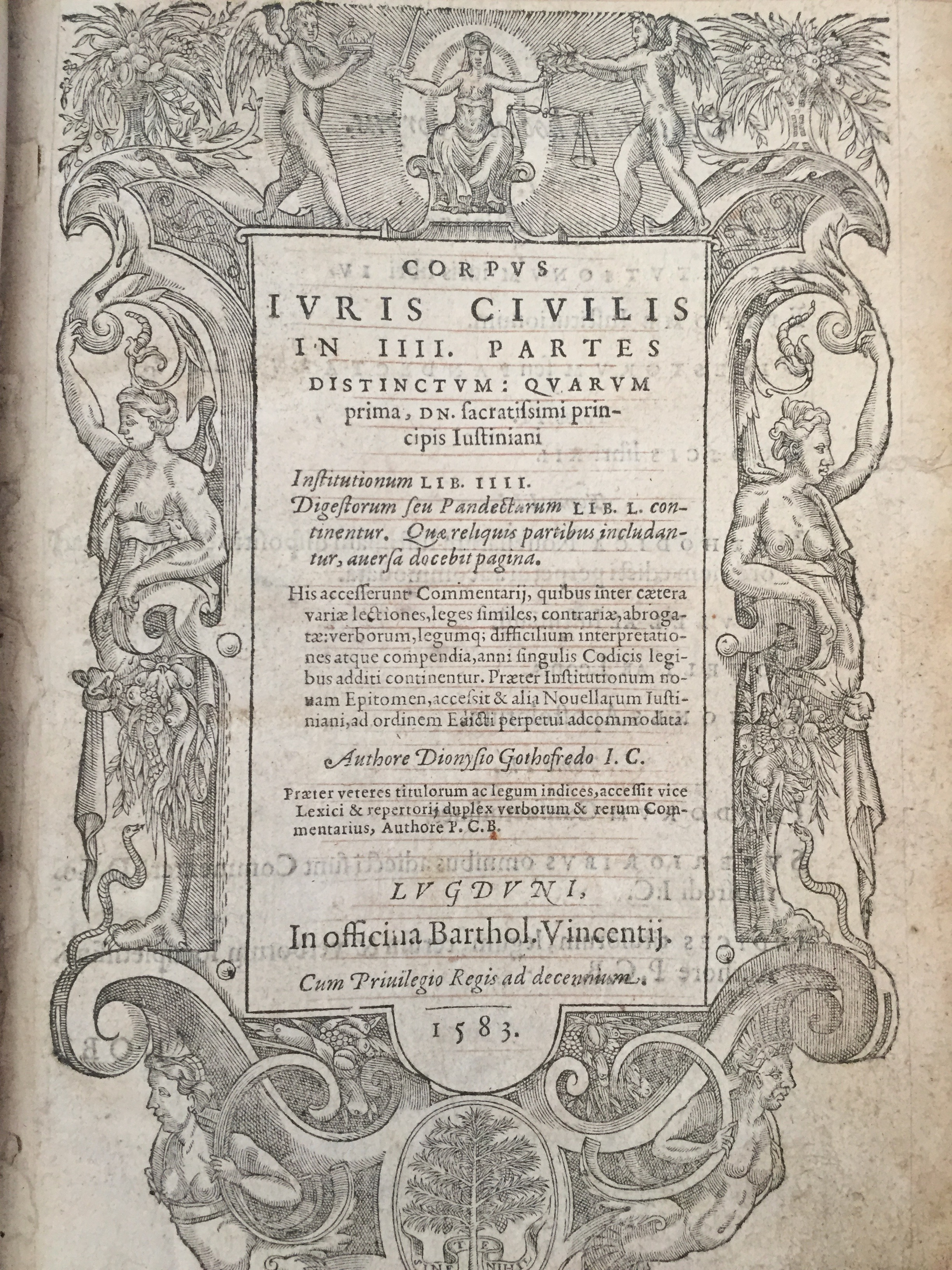
- Corpus Iuris Civilis, 1583

Petrus Sabbatius Iustinianus, Roman emperor
- Territorial extent: Eastern Roman Empire
- Enacted by: Petrus Sabbatius Iustinianus, Roman emperor
- Effective: 534
- Introduced by: John the Cappadocian, Tribonian

The Corpus Juris (or Iuris) Civilis ("Body of Civil Law") is the modern name (Note: The name "Corpus Juris Civilis" occurs for the first time in 1583 as the title of a complete edition of the Justinianic code by Dionysius Godofredus. Kunkel (1966, p. 157, n. 2)) for a collection of fundamental works in jurisprudence, enacted from 529 to 534 by order of Roman Emperor Justinian I. It is also sometimes referred to metonymically after one of its parts, the Code of Justinian.

The work as planned had three parts: the Code (Codex) is a compilation, by selection and extraction, of imperial enactments to date; the Digest or Pandects (the Latin title contains both Digesta and Pandectae) is an encyclopedia composed of mostly brief extracts from the writings of Roman jurists; and the Institutes (Institutiones) is a student textbook, mainly introducing the Code, although it has important conceptual elements that are less developed in the Code or the Digest. All three parts, even the textbook, were given force of law. They were intended to be, together, the sole source of law; reference to any other source, including the original texts from which the Code and the Digest had been taken, was forbidden. Nonetheless, Justinian found himself having to enact further laws; today these are counted as a fourth part of the Corpus, the Novellae Constitutiones (Novels, literally New Laws).

The work was directed by Tribonian, an official in Justinian's court in Constantinople. His team was authorized to edit what they included. How far they made amendments is not recorded and, in the main, cannot be known because most of the originals have not survived. The text was composed and distributed almost entirely in Latin, which was still the official language of the government of the Eastern Roman Empire in 529–534, whereas the prevalent language of merchants, farmers, seamen, and other citizens was Greek. By the early 7th century, Greek had largely replaced Latin as the dominant language of the empire.

The Corpus Juris Civilis was revised into Greek, when that became the predominant language of the Eastern Roman Empire, and continued to form the basis of the empire's laws, the Basilika (Greek: τὰ βασιλικά, 'imperial laws'), through the 15th century. The Basilika in turn served as the basis for local legal codes in the Balkans during the following Ottoman period and later formed the basis of the legal code of Modern Greece. In Western Europe, the Corpus Juris Civilis, or its successor texts like the Basilika, did not get well established originally and was only recovered in the Middle Ages, being "received" or imitated as private law. Its public law content was quarried for arguments by both secular and ecclesiastical authorities. This recovered Roman law, in turn, became the foundation of law in all civil law jurisdictions. The provisions of the Corpus Juris Civilis also influenced the canon law of the Catholic Church: it was said that ecclesia vivit lege romana – the church lives by Roman law. Its influence on common law legal systems has been markedly less, although still significant, with Latinate legal concepts and terminology from the Corpus having survived through Norman law, canon law, and civil law influences – such as the contrast, especially in the Institutes, between "law" (statute) and custom. The Corpus continues to have a major influence on public international law. Its four parts thus constitute the foundation documents of the Western legal tradition.

== Compilation process ==
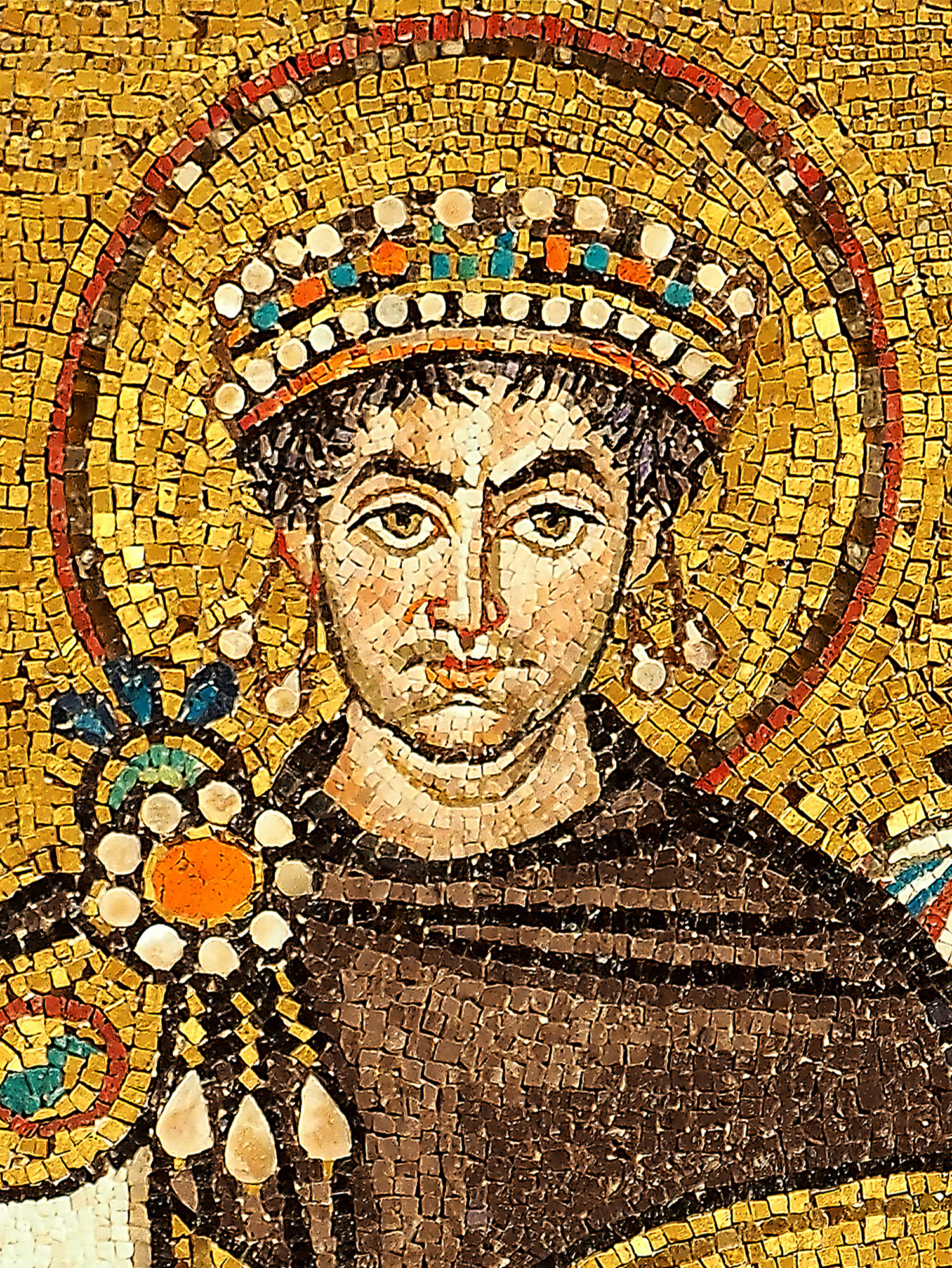
Justinian I depicted on a mosaic in the church of San Vitale, Ravenna, Italy

Justinian acceded to the imperial throne in Constantinople in 527. Six months after his accession, in order to reduce the great number of imperial constitutions and thus also the number of court proceedings, Justinian arranged for the creation of a new collection of imperial constitutions (Codex Iustinianus). The commission in charge of the compilation process was explicitly authorized to leave out or change text and to delete what was obsolete or contradictory. Soon, in 529, the Codex was completed and was conferred the force of law in the whole empire, replacing all earlier constitutions and the Codex Theodosianus.

A little more than a year after the enactment of the first edition of the Code, Justinian appointed a commission headed by Tribonian to compile the traditional jurists' law in a new, shortened and contemporary codification: the 'Digest or Pandects'. The traditional collection of jurists' law, Justinian believed, was so extensive that it had become unmanageable, necessitating a new compilation. The commission completed its work within three years, in 533.

Tribonian's commission surveyed the works of classical jurists who were assumed in Justinian's time to have the authority to clarify law (ius respondendi) and whose works were still available. In total, there are excerpts from 38 jurists in the Digest.

== The four parts ==
=== Codex ===
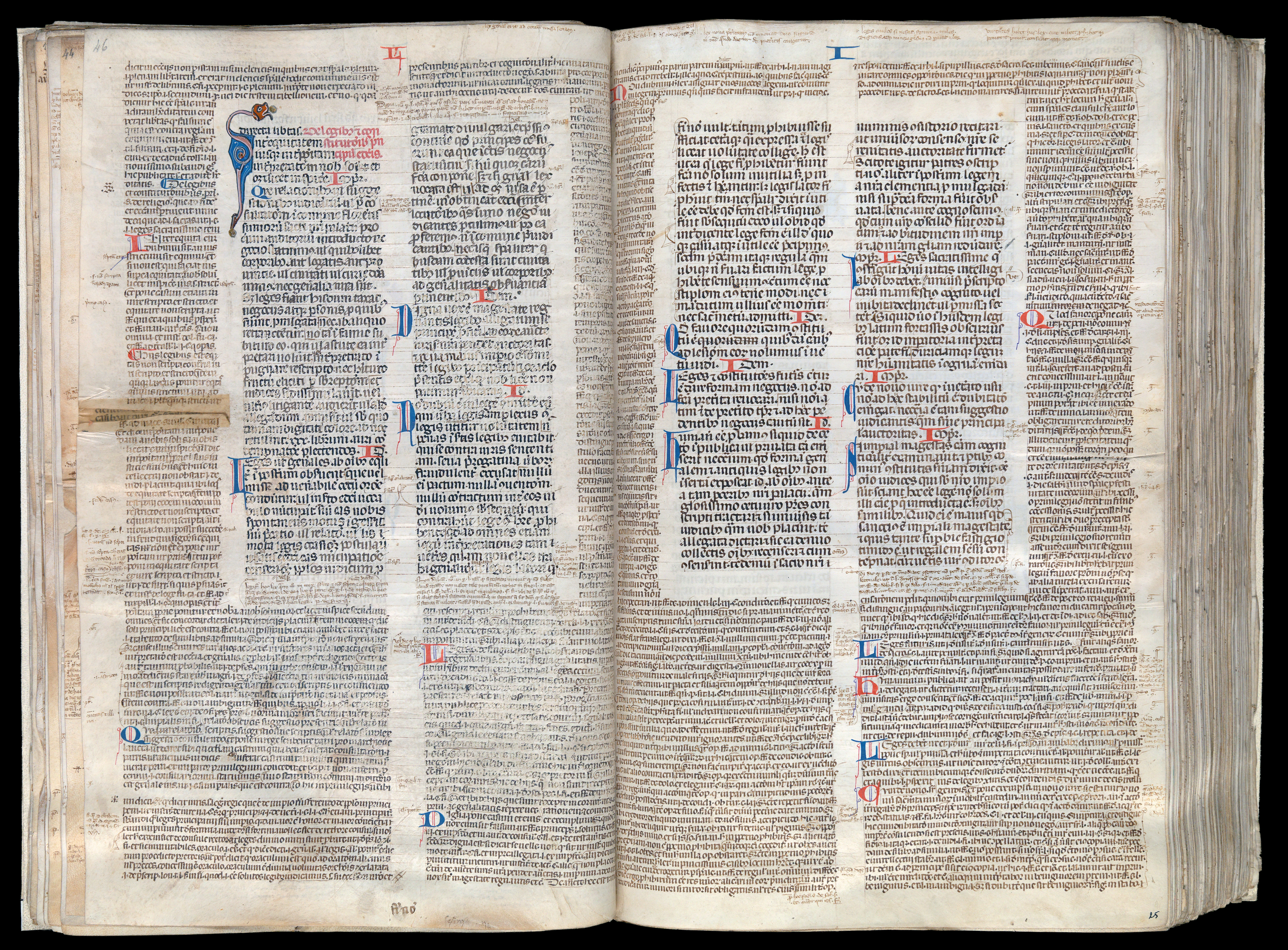
13th-century manuscript of the Codex with the glossa ordinaria on the margins.

The "Codex Justinianus", "Codex Justinianeus" or "Codex Justiniani" (Latin for "Justinian's Code") was the first part to be finished, on 7 April 529. It contained in Latin most of the existing imperial constitutiones (imperial pronouncements having force of law), back to the time of Hadrian. It used both the Codex Theodosianus and the fourth-century collections embodied in the Codex Gregorianus and Codex Hermogenianus, which provided the model for division into books that were themselves divided into titles. These works had developed authoritative standing. This first edition is now lost; a second edition was issued in 534 and is the text that has survived. At least the second edition contained some of Justinian's own legislation, including some legislation in Greek. It is not known whether he intended there to be further editions, although he did envisage translation of Latin enactments into Greek.

==== Legislation about religion ====
Numerous provisions served to secure the status of Christianity as the state religion of the empire, uniting Church and state, and making anyone who was not connected to the Christian church a non-citizen. The Christianity referred to is Chalcedonian Christianity as defined by the state church, which excluded the other major Christian branches, namely the Church of the East and Oriental Orthodoxy.

===== Laws against heresy =====
The very first law in the Codex requires all persons under the jurisdiction of the Empire to hold the Christian faith: "We desire that all peoples who are governed by the moderation of Our Clemency shall practice that religion which was handed down by the divine Apostle Peter to the Romans . . ." This was primarily aimed at heresies such as Nestorianism. This text later became the springboard for discussions of international law, especially the question of just what persons are under the jurisdiction of a given state or legal system.

===== Laws against paganism =====
Other laws, while not aimed at pagan belief as such, forbid particular pagan practices. For example, it is provided that all persons present at a pagan sacrifice may be indicted as if for murder.

=== Digesta ===
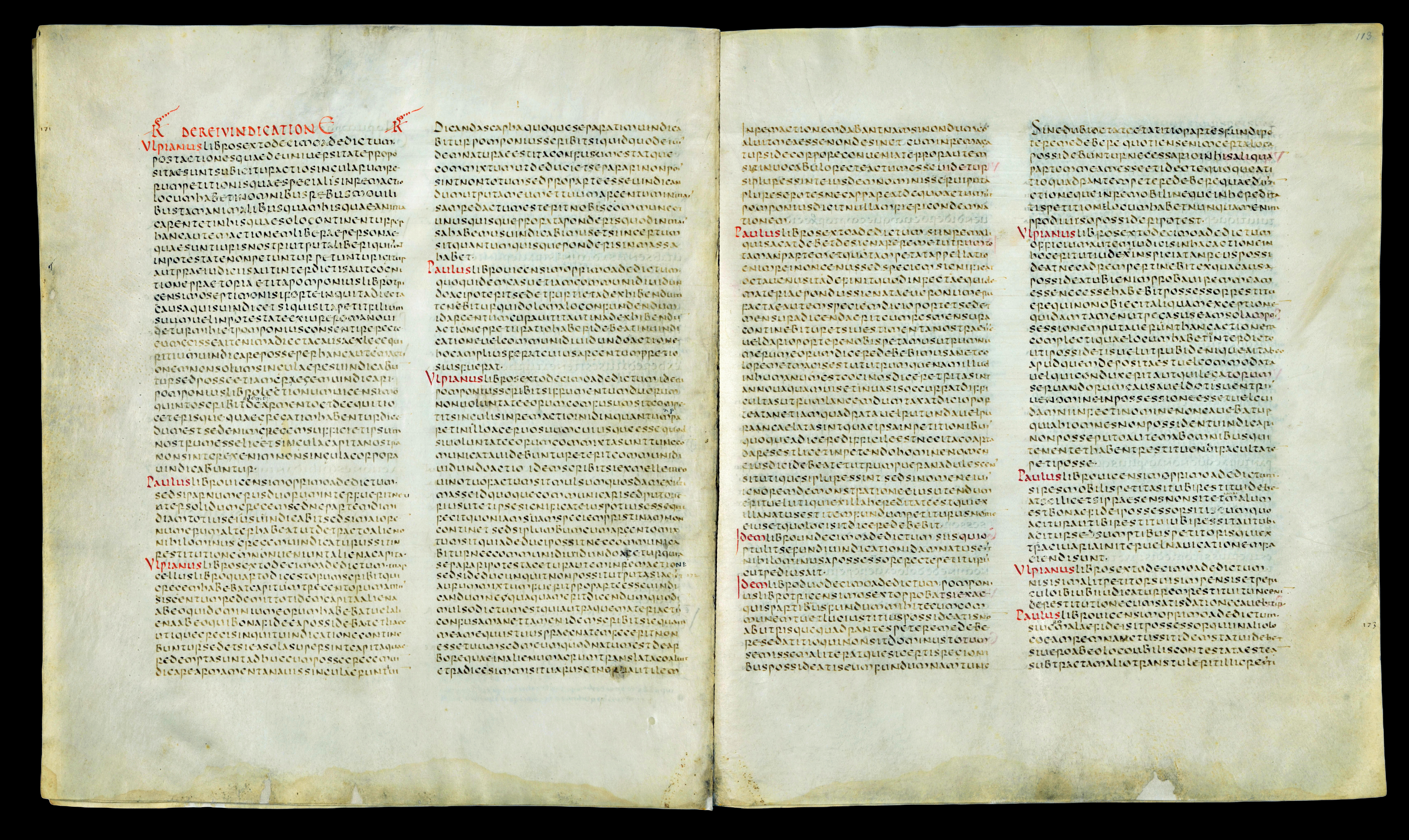
Digest excerpt (D. 6.1) from the 6th-century Littera Florentina.

The Digesta or Pandectae, completed in 533, is a collection of juristic writings, mostly dating back to the second and third centuries. Fragments were taken out of various legal treatises and opinions and inserted in the Digest. In their original context, the statements of the law contained in these fragments were just private opinions of legal scholars – although some juristic writings had been privileged by Theodosius II's Law of Citations in 426. The Digest, however, was given full force of law.

=== Institutions ===
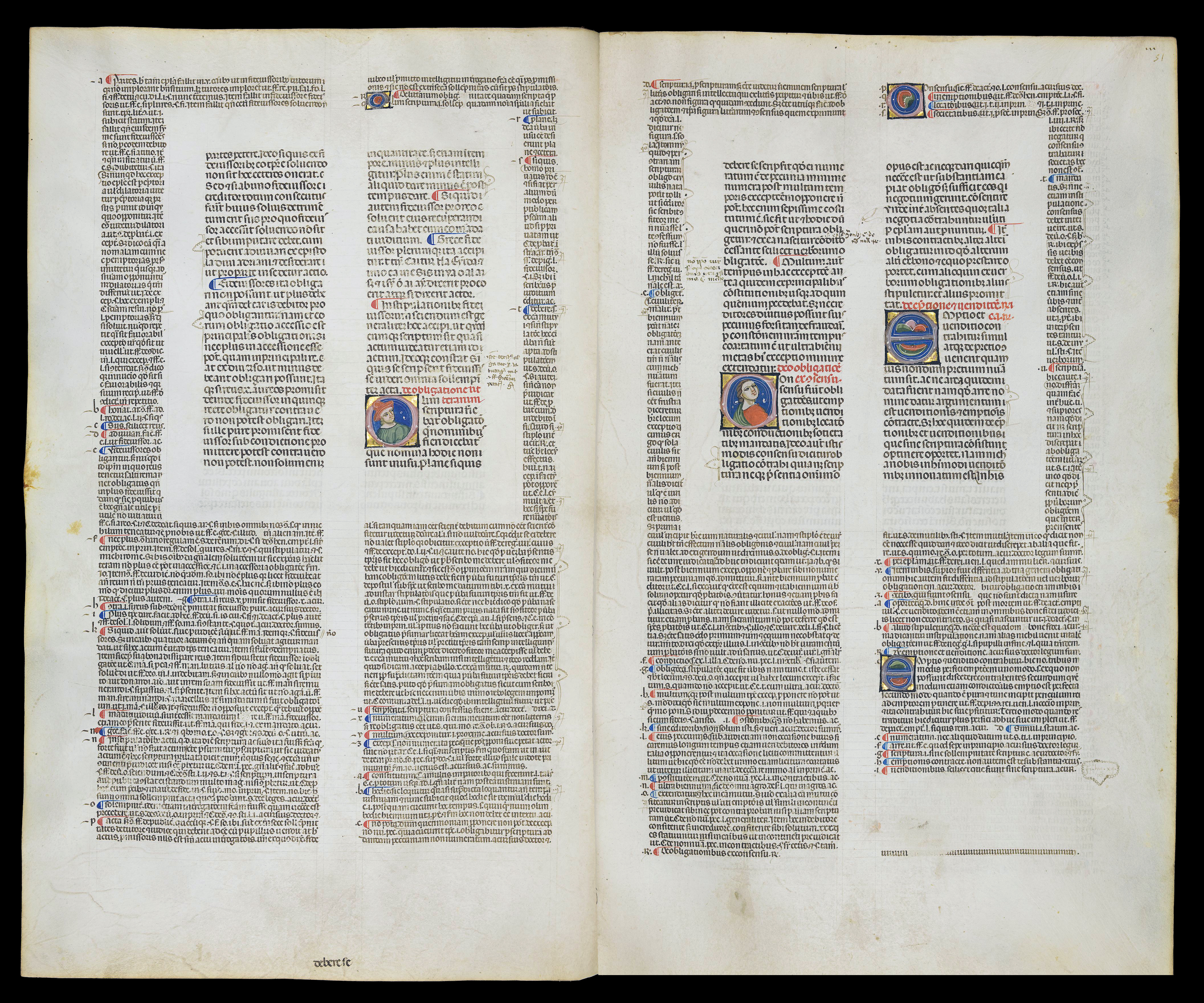
14th-century manuscript of the Institutiones with glossa ordinaria.

As the Digest neared completion, Tribonian and two professors, Theophilus and Dorotheus, made a student textbook, called the Institutions or Elements. As there were four elements, the manual consists of four books. The Institutiones are largely based on the Institutiones of Gaius. Two-thirds of the Institutiones of Justinian consists of literal quotes from Gaius. The new Institutiones were used as a manual for jurists in training from 21 November 533 and were given the authority of law on 30 December 533 along with the Digest.

According to Charles Donahue the difference between procedural and substantive law entered medieval and modern legal thought from Justinian's Institutes.

=== Novellae ===
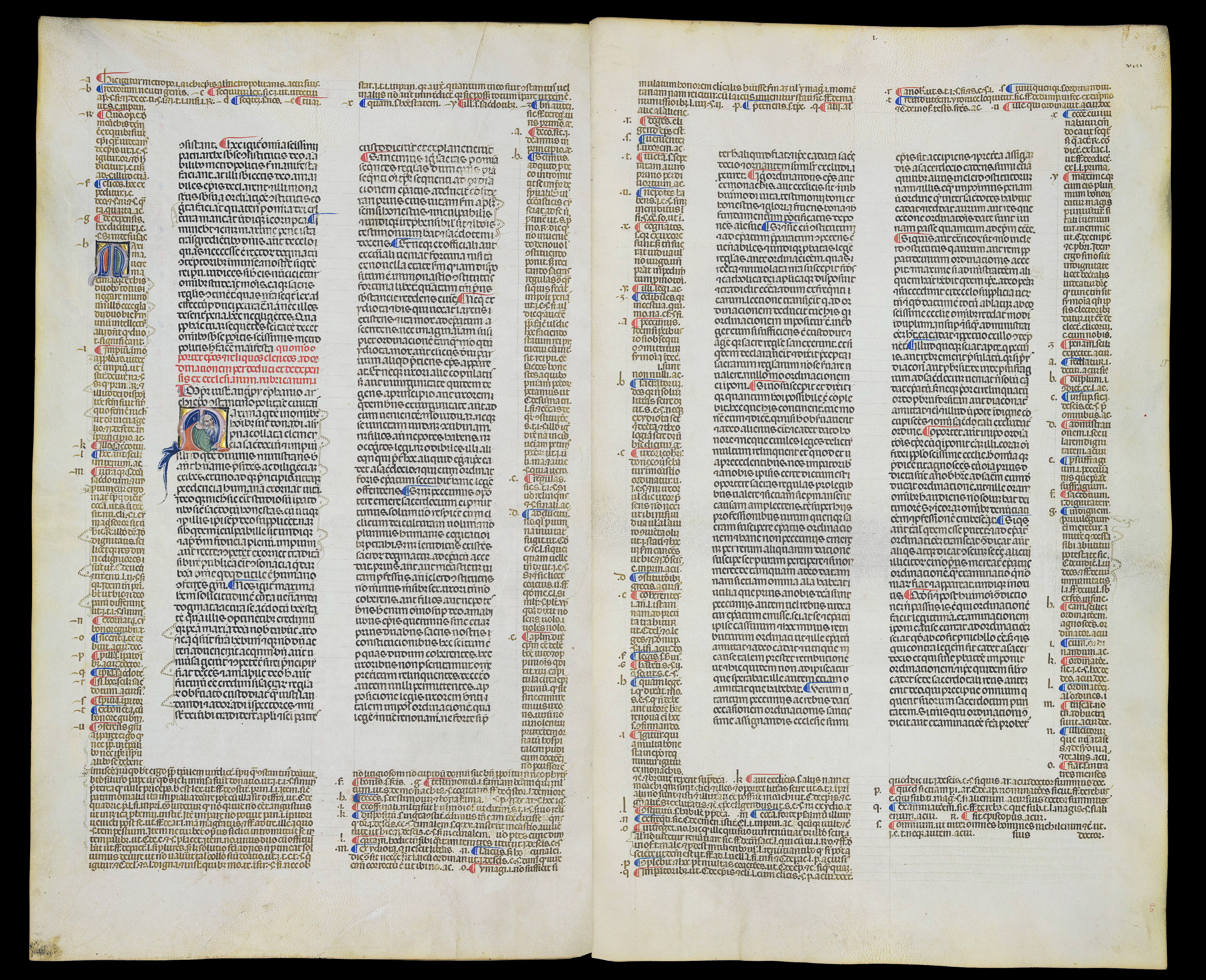
The Novellae in a 14th-century manuscript with the glossa ordinaria.

The Novellae consisted of new laws that were passed after 534. They were later re-worked into the Syntagma, a practical lawyer's edition, by Athanasios of Emesa during the years 572–577.

== Continuation in the Eastern Empire ==
The term "Byzantine Empire" (or "Byzantium") is used today to refer to what remained of the Roman Empire in the Eastern Mediterranean after the Western Empire collapsed. The Eastern Empire continued to use Roman law, and it was as the ruler of this Eastern Empire that Justinian formalized Roman law in his "Corpus Juris Civilis.", As the administrative language of the Eastern Roman Empire shifted away from Latin, legal codes based on the Corpus Juris Civilis were enacted in Greek. The best-known are:

- the Ekloge ton nomon (740) – enacted by emperor Leo the Isaurian;
- the Procheiron and Epanagoge (c. 879) – enacted by emperor Basil the Macedonian; and
- the Basilika (late 9th century) – started by Basil the Macedonian and finished by his son, emperor Leo the Wise.

The Basilika was a complete adaptation of Justinian's codification. At 60 volumes it proved to be difficult for judges and lawyers to use. There was need for a short and handy version. This was finally made by Constantine Harmenopoulos, a Byzantine judge from Thessaloniki, in 1345. He made a short version of Basilika in six books, called Hexabiblos. This was widely used throughout the Balkans during the following Ottoman period, and along with the Basilika was used as the first legal code for the newly independent Greek state in the 1820s. Serbian state, law and culture was built on the foundations of Rome and Byzantium. Therefore, the most important Serbian legal codes: Zakonopravilo (1219) and Dušan's Code (1349 and 1354), transplanted Roman-Byzantine law included in Corpus Juris Civilis, Procheiron and Basilika. These Serbian codes were practised until the Serbian Despotate fell to the Ottoman Empire in 1459. During the Serbian Revolution, Byzantine law was still in effect and was adopted in the Serbian Civil Code (1844), modeled after Serbian customary law and the Austrian civil code.

== Recovery in the West ==
Justinian's Corpus Juris Civilis was distributed in the West (Note: As the Littera Florentina, a copy recovered in Pisa, demonstrates.) and went into effect in those areas regained under Justinian's wars of reconquest (Pragmatic Sanction of 554), including the Exarchate of Ravenna. Accordingly, the Institutes were made the textbook at the law school in Rome, and later in Ravenna when the school relocated there. However, after the loss of most of these areas, only the Catepanate (southern Italy) maintained a Byzantine legal tradition, but there the Corpus was superseded by the Ekloge ton nomon and Basilika. Only the Corpus's provisions regulating the church still had any effect, but the Catholic church's de facto autonomy and the Great Schism made even that irrelevant. In Western Europe, the Corpus may have spurred a slew of Romano-Germanic law codes in the successor Germanic kingdoms, but these were heavily based on the older Theodosian Code, not the Corpus.

Historians disagree on the precise way the Corpus was recovered in Northern Italy about 1070. Several factors were likely involved, including disputes between the Holy Roman Empire and the papacy. Aside from the Littera Florentina (a complete 6th-century copy of the Digest preserved in Amalfi and later moved to Pisa) and the Epitome Codicis (c. 1050; incomplete manuscript preserving most of the Codex) there may have been other manuscript sources for the text that began to be taught at Bologna, by Pepo and then by Irnerius. (Note: For a detailed account of how the relevant manuscripts and their transmission, see generally Radding & Ciaralli (2007)) Irnerius' technique was to read a passage aloud, which permitted his students to copy it, then to deliver an excursus explaining and illuminating Justinian's text, in the form of glosses. Irnerius' pupils, the so-called Four Doctors of Bologna, were among the first of the "glossators" who established the curriculum of medieval Roman law. The last and most important gloss was authored by Accursius and became known as the Glossa ordinaria. The tradition was carried on by French lawyers, known as the Ultramontani, in the 13th century.

The merchant classes of Italian communes required law with a concept of equity, and law that covered situations inherent in urban life better than the primitive Germanic oral traditions. The provenance of the Code appealed to scholars who saw in the Holy Roman Empire a revival of venerable precedents from the classical heritage. The new class of lawyers staffed the bureaucracies that were beginning to be required by the princes of Europe. The University of Bologna, where Justinian's Code was first taught, remained the dominant centre for the study of law through the High Middle Ages.

Medieval versions of the Corpus sometimes incorporated additional texts, such as the Libri Feudorum and Authentica habita.

A two-volume edition of the Digest was published in Paris in 1549 and 1550, translated by Antonio Agustín, Bishop of Tarragona, who was well known for other legal works. The full title of the Digest was Digestorum seu Pandectarum tomus alter, and it was published by Carolus Guillardus. Vol. 1 of the Digest has 2934 pages, while vol. 2 has 2754 pages. Referring to Justinian's Code as Corpus Juris Civilis was only adopted in the 16th century, when it was printed in 1583 by Dionysius Gothofredus under this title. The legal thinking behind the Corpus Juris Civilis served as the backbone of the single largest legal reform of the modern age, the Napoleonic Code, which marked the abolition of feudalism, but reinstated slavery in the French Caribbean. Napoleon, as he waged total war on Europe, wanted to see these principles introduced to the whole of Europe because he saw them as an effective form of rule that created a more equal society and thus creating a more friendly relationship between the ruling class and the rest of the peoples of Europe.

The Corpus Juris Civilis was translated into French, German, Italian, and Spanish in the 19th century. However, no English translation of the entire Corpus Juris Civilis existed until 1932 when Samuel Parsons Scott published his version The Civil Law. Scott did not base his translation on the best available Latin versions, and his work was severely criticized. Fred. H. Blume used the best-regarded Latin editions for his translations of the Code and of the Novels. A new English translation of the Code, based on Blume's, was published in October 2016. In 2018, the Cambridge University Press also published a new English translation of the Novels, based primarily on the Greek text.

== See also ==
- Frederick Barbarossa
- Basilika
- Byzantine law
- Code of Hammurabi
- Codex Repetitae Praelectionis
- Corpus Juris Canonici
- Henry de Bracton
- Dušan's Code
- International Roman Law Moot Court
- List of Roman laws
- Twelve Tables
- Zakonopravilo

== Sources ==
- Kunkel, Wolfgang (1966). An introduction to Roman legal and constitutional history. Oxford: Clarendon Press. OCLC 1150050131.
- Radding, Charles M.; Ciaralli, Antonio (2007). The Corpus juris civilis in the Middle ages: manuscripts and transmission from the sixth century to the juristic revival. Brill's studies in intellectual history. Leiden: Brill. ISBN 978-90-04-15499-5.
- Vincenti, Umberto (25 October 2010). "Roman Law". In Grafton, Anthony; Most, Glenn W.; Settis, Salvatore (eds.). The Classical Tradition. Cambridge (Mass.): Harvard University Press. ISBN 978-0-674-03572-0.
- Mousourakis, George (2015). Roman Law and the Origins of the Civil Law Tradition. Cham: Springer International Publishing. doi:10.1007/978-3-319-12268-7. ISBN 978-3-319-12267-0.
- Corcoran, S. (2016). "The Codex of Justinian: the life of a text through 1,500 years". In B. Frier (ed.). The Codex of Justinian: A New Annotated Translation, with Parallel Latin and Greek Text. Newcastle University.
