= Asio (disambiguation) =

Asio is a genus of owls.

Asio or ASIO may also refer to:

- asio (C++ library), a programming library for asynchronous I/O
- Audio Stream Input/Output, computer sound card driver protocol for low-latency digital audio
- Australian Security Intelligence Organisation
- "ASIO", a song by Redgum from Frontline
- "ASIO" a song by Benny Cristo

== See also ==
- AZO (disambiguation)
- ACO (disambiguation)
