= Pepo (jurist) =

Pepo was an 11th-century consultant judge ("causidicus") who became the first law teacher at the University of Bologna. His teaching was based on Justinian's compilations of Roman law, including the Code, Institutes, and Digest.

== Biography ==
Having come down to us only by citation in the works of Odofredus and the Englishman Radulfus Niger (Rudolph the Black) and quoted in the French Summa Istitutionum where his explanation of the etymology of mutual is recorded, it is known that he was the leading exponent of the Ravenna school and that he was indeed the first (known to have been) who ventured into the study of the Justinian works, though probably only for personal erudition and not systematically and didactically as Irnerius would later do.

Pepo taught, and there was also an audience willing to receive that teaching.

According to the results of research conducted by legal historian Fiorelli, Pepo was probably a cleric, perhaps even a schismatic bishop of Bologna. In fact, we know of a story in hexameter verse, entitled De utroque apostolico (“Of the Two Popes”), that Gualfredo bishop of Siena wrote between the 11th and 12th centuries, in which he tells of an imaginary conference held in the time of Pope Urban II, around 1090, to discuss the rights of the pope and the antipope of imperial appointment in order to resolve the schism between empire and papacy, in the years of the fiercest struggle between emperor and pontiff. The conference would have been attended by bishops and prominent personalities including a certain Pepone even qualified clarum bononiensium lumen (famous light of the Bolognese ). Gualfredo's verses have not come down to us in the original but have been handed down from the Historiae senenses by Sigismondo Ticci, a 16th-century Sienese historian and humanist; it was probably Ticci and not Gualfredo who called Pepone luce dei bolognesi and further added that he was bishop of Bologna.
