= Azo =

Azo or AZO may refer to:

- Azo of Bologna, a medieval Italian jurist
- Azo of Iberia, a Georgian ruler
- Azo compound, a functional group and class of compounds
- Azo dye, a class of colored compounds containing the azo group
- Aluminium-doped zinc oxide, a transparent conducting film; see Indium tin oxide § Doped compounds
- Alpha Zeta Omega, a pharmaceutical fraternity
- AutoZone (NYSE ticker symbol: AZO)
- Awing language (ISO 639-3 code: azo), a Grassfields Bantu language spoken in Cameroon
- Azimuth (airline) (ICAO airline code: AZO), a Russian airline
- Kalamazoo/Battle Creek International Airport (IATA airport code: AZO), in Michigan
- A urinary tract analgesic also known as phenazopyridine

== See also ==
- Asio (disambiguation)
- ACO (disambiguation)
