= Jacobus Balduinus =

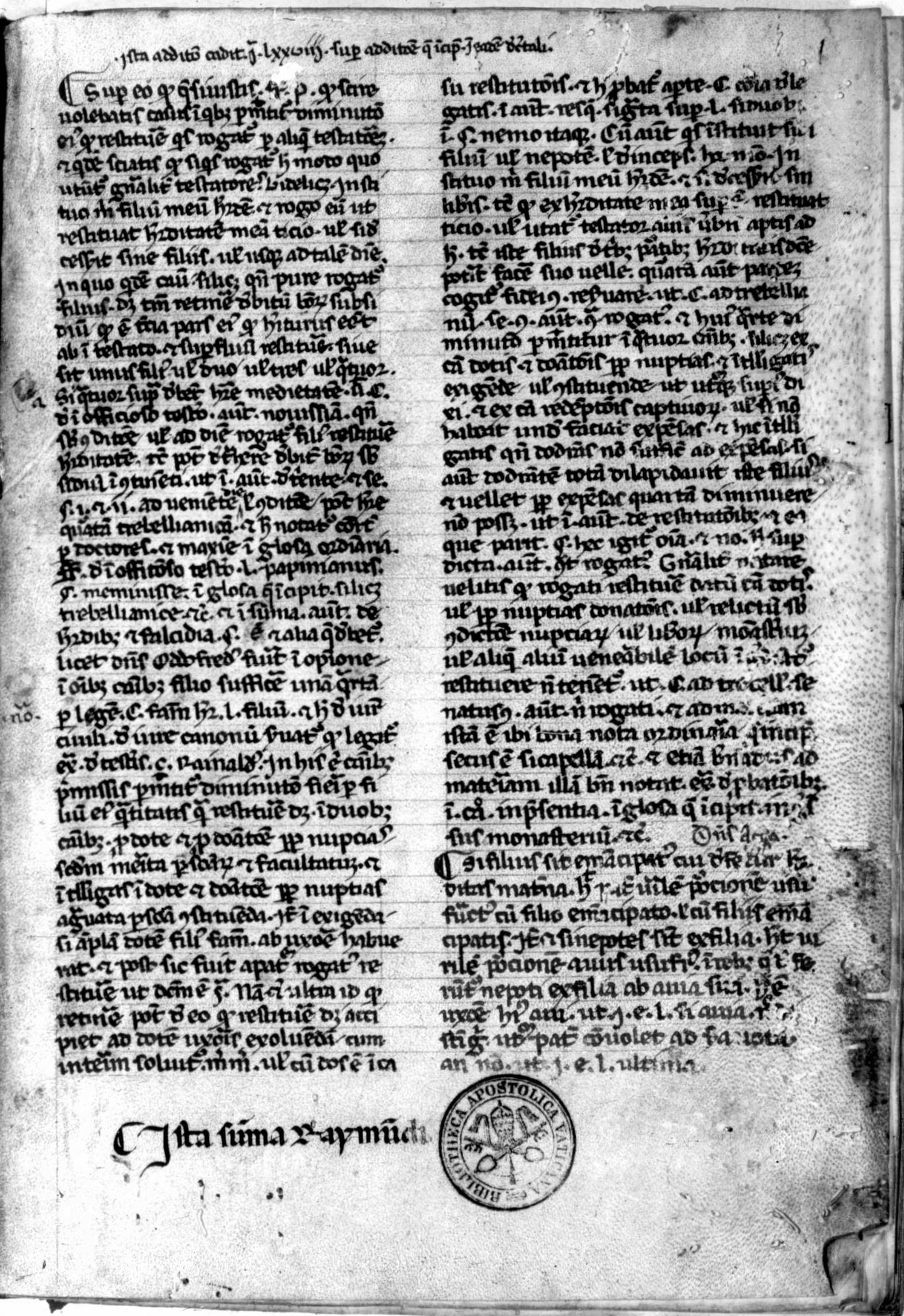
Quaestiones, 14th-century manuscript. Città del Vaticano, Biblioteca Apostolica Vaticana, Fondo Vaticano latino, Vat. lat. 2301, ff. 13r-v, 20v.

Jacobus Balduinus (about 1175 – 10 April 1235) was an Italian jurist.

Balduinus was born in Bologna probably about 1175, and is reputed to have been of a noble family. He was a pupil of Azo, and the master of Odofredus, of the canonist Hostiensis (Henricus de Segusio), and of Jacobus de Ravanis (Jacques de Revigny), who taught at Orléans. His great fame as a professor of civil law at the University of Bologna caused Balduinus to be elected podestà of the city of Genoa, where he was entrusted with the reforms of the law of the Genoese Republic. He died at Bologna in 1235, and has left behind him some treatises on procedure.

== Biography ==
He was born in Bologna probably around 1175, reputedly from a noble family. He was a contemporary of Albert of Pavia, a student of Azo of Bologna and teacher of Odofredo, the canonist Hostiensis (Henry of Susa) and Jacobus de Ravanis (Jacques de Révigny), who taught at Orléans.

His great fame as a professor of Civil law (legal system) at the University of Bologna caused Balduino to be elected podestà of the city of Genoa (from 1229 to 1231), where he was entrusted with reforming the laws of the Republic of Genoa.

He died in Bologna in 1235, leaving several treatises on Trial, the first of their kind.
