= Misfeasance =

Types of failure to discharge public obligations under law

Misfeasance, nonfeasance, and malfeasance are types of failure to discharge public obligations existing by common law, custom, or statute.

The Carta de Logu caused Eleanor of Arborea to be remembered as one of the first lawmakers to set up the crime of misfeasance.

== Definition and relevant rules of law ==
When a contract creates a duty that does not exist at common law, there are three things the parties can do wrong:

- Nonfeasance is the failure to act where action is required—willfully or in neglect. Nonfeasance is similar to omission.
- Misfeasance is the willful inappropriate action or intentional incorrect action or advice.
- Malfeasance is the willful and intentional action that injures a party.

For example, if a company hires a catering company to provide drinks and food for a retirement party, and the catering company fails to show up, it is considered nonfeasance. If the catering company shows up but provides only the drinks (but not the food, which was also paid for), it is considered misfeasance. If the catering company accepts a bribe from the client's competitor to undercook the meat, thereby giving those present food poisoning, it is considered malfeasance.

The rule of law laid down is that an action in contract (ex contractu) will lie for any of the three. However, an action in tort (ex delicto) will lie only in misfeasance or malfeasance. The doctrine was formerly applied to certain callings carried on publicly.

Currently, the terms misfeasance and nonfeasance are most often used with reference to the conduct of municipal authorities with reference to the discharge of their statutory obligations; and it is an established rule that an action lies in favour of persons injured by misfeasance, by negligence in discharge of the duty but that in the case of nonfeasance the remedy is not by action but by indictment or mandamus or by the particular procedure prescribed by the statutes.

This rule is fully established in the case of failure to repair public highways, but in other cases, the courts are astute to find evidence of carelessness in the discharge of public duties and on that basis to award damages to individuals who have suffered.

Misfeasance is also used with reference to the conduct of directors and officers of joint-stock companies. The word is sometimes used as equivalent to malpractice by a medical practitioner.

Misfeasance in the context of directors who run companies can be deployed to refer to actions that fall below the standard expected and which may be prescribed in legislative provisions.

== See also ==
- Connivance
- Malfeasance in office
- Misfeasance in public office
- Political corruption
- Sabotage
