= Ex delicto =

Ex delicto, Latin for "from a wrong" or "from a transgression", is a legal term that indicates a consequence of a tort, though the phrase can also refer to the consequence of a crime. This is in contrast to ex contractu, a consequence arising from or based on a contract.

== See also ==
- Misfeasance
