= Suiton =

Dumpling soup

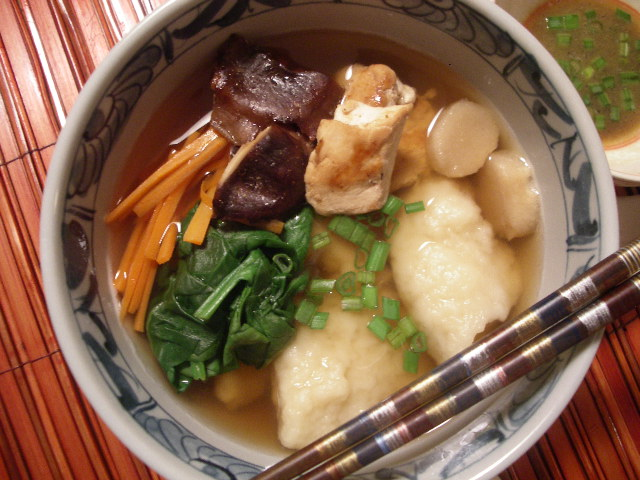
suiton (すいとん)

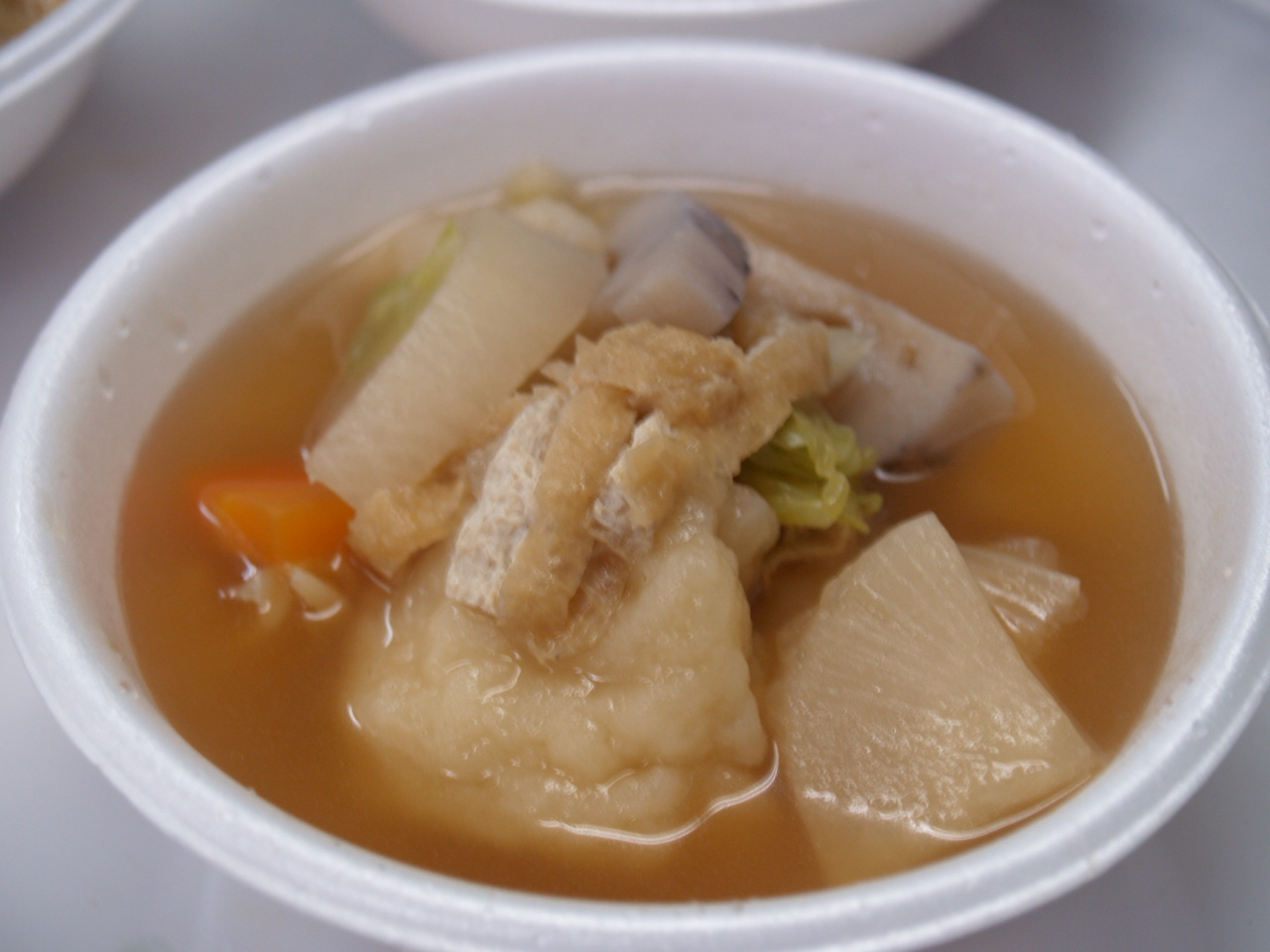
a variation of suiton

Suiton (水団 or すいとん) is a Japanese dish that is made by slicing flour dough by hand, rolling it by hand, and scooping it into small pieces, then boiling it in soup.

== Overview ==
Suiton has a long history, and its root "mizu-dango" can be seen in the Muromachi period. It is also called "water dumpling". The cooking method of suiton on the material has changed drastically, and the form of hand-cooked flour like today appears in the late Edo period. From the Edo era to the prewar days, there were stalls and restaurants specializing in suiton, and it was popular food for ordinary people at that time. Although it had decreased considerably in the middle of the Taisho era, immediately after the Great Kanto Earthquake, stalls appeared everywhere in the burned fields as the food situation worsened.

It is a type of dumpling, and as a cooking recipe, "suiton" is made from crushing grains and nuts containing gluten and dropping them into hot water or soup. The way to eat depends on how much effort or arrange the cook has, or a regional custom.

There are many variations, such as simple dumplings made by mixed dough into hot water, and zoni with miso soup or simple soup with broth.

Suiton is also sold as vacuum-packed products by noodle manufacturers such as Shimadaya.

== Regional Variation ==
The name of "suito" is known nationwide, but differs a little depending on the region, "hittsumi (ひっつみ)", "hatto" (はっと), "tsumeri" (つめり), "tottenage" (とってなげ), "odansu" (おだんす) and "hinnobe" (ひんのべ); - called by the name of the dish. These foods similar to suiton are characterized by the ingredients and dashi stock that are put in each region, and the cooking methods differ from region to region. Even in the same region, cooking methods and names vary depending on a district or individual home.

For example, "Hatto" in the northern area of the Miyagi prefecture to Iwate prefecture in the northern part of the Sendai clan is divided into small chunks of flour dough kneaded with cool water and thinned by stretching it like noodle with fingers. In Aomori prefecture, Iwate prefecture, etc., the manner of dividing flour dough is different.
