= Hatto Ständer =

- Born: 14 January 1929; Witten, Germany
- Died: 10 August 2000 (aged 71); Dortmund, Germany
- Education: Folkwang Hochschule; Musikhochschule Freiburg
- Occupations: Organist; Church musician; Academic; Composer
- Organizations: Dortmund University

Hatto Ständer (14 January 1929 – 10 August 2000) was a German church musician, academic, concert organist and composer. He was a professor of organ and choral conducting at the Dortmund University for three decades, and director of its department Catholic church music. His compositions are mostly sacred music, but he also wrote piano music and chamber music. He served as an advisor to organ builders for notable organs in Dortmund.

== Career ==
Born in Witten, Ständer showed musical talent early. He played the organ in church liturgies at age nine. At age 13, he became a pupil of the Musisches Gymnasium, a school specialising in music and arts, in Frankfurt, where he was inspired by Kurt Thomas who taught counterpoint, composition and conducting. Ständer studied piano and composition at the Folkwang Hochschule in Essen. He was accepted to the piano master class of Carl Seemann at the Musikhochschule Freiburg, and won a prize at the Deutscher Hochschulklavierwettbewerb. He completed his studies of organ and church music at Dortmund University, where he taught from 1960 to 1992 organ, choral conducting, Gregorian chant and composition (Tonsatz). He was appointed Kirchenmusikdirektor and director of the department of Catholic church music in 1971, and professor in 1974.

Most of Ständer's compositions are dedicated to sacred music. He gave concerts in Germany and beyond, and made recordings with broadcasters. He was an advisor to organ builders, such as for the organ of the Propsteikirche in Dortmund, built by Siegfried Sauer. He designed an all-purpose instrument with French sound concepts in mind. He played the opening concert on 23 October 1988. He was instrumental in the concept for the organ at the Konzerthaus Dortmund, built by Klais Orgelbau, but did not live to see it built. He died in Dortmund in 2000.

== Work ==
The publisher Verlag Dohr has printed Ständer's complete works, which includes besides his well-known sacred compositions also early piano and chamber works written in student years when he still considered a career as a composer. Most of these are first prints, based on the last autographs from his nachlass. His sacred music is focused on a renewal of Catholic church music after the Second Vatican Council.

Sacred vocal music

- Auferstehungslied (Erich Przywara; 1950)
- Cantate Domino (1985)
- Deutsches Proprium vom ersten Ostertage (1971)
- Deutsches Proprium vom Ostersonntag (1966)
- Deutsches Proprium zum Fest Mariae, Mutter vom guten Rate (1967)
- Deutsches Proprium zum Pfingstsonntag (1988)
- Missa in E major, Op. 4 (1947)

Secular vocal music

- Neun Lieder (1946–1954)

Organ music

- Chorale Suite (1966)
- Fanfare (1992)
- Toccata und Fuge in D (1959)

Piano music

- Fantasie in F minor, Op. 8 (1942)
- Impressionen am Lake Almanor (1981)
- Piano Sonata IV in B-flat major, Op. 12 (c. 1942)
- Variationen und Fuge über ein eigenes Thema (1946)

Chamber music

- Kleine Weihnachtsmusik (1943)
- Sonata in D minor (1943)
- Trio, Op. 1 (1945)
