= Littera Florentina =

Codex

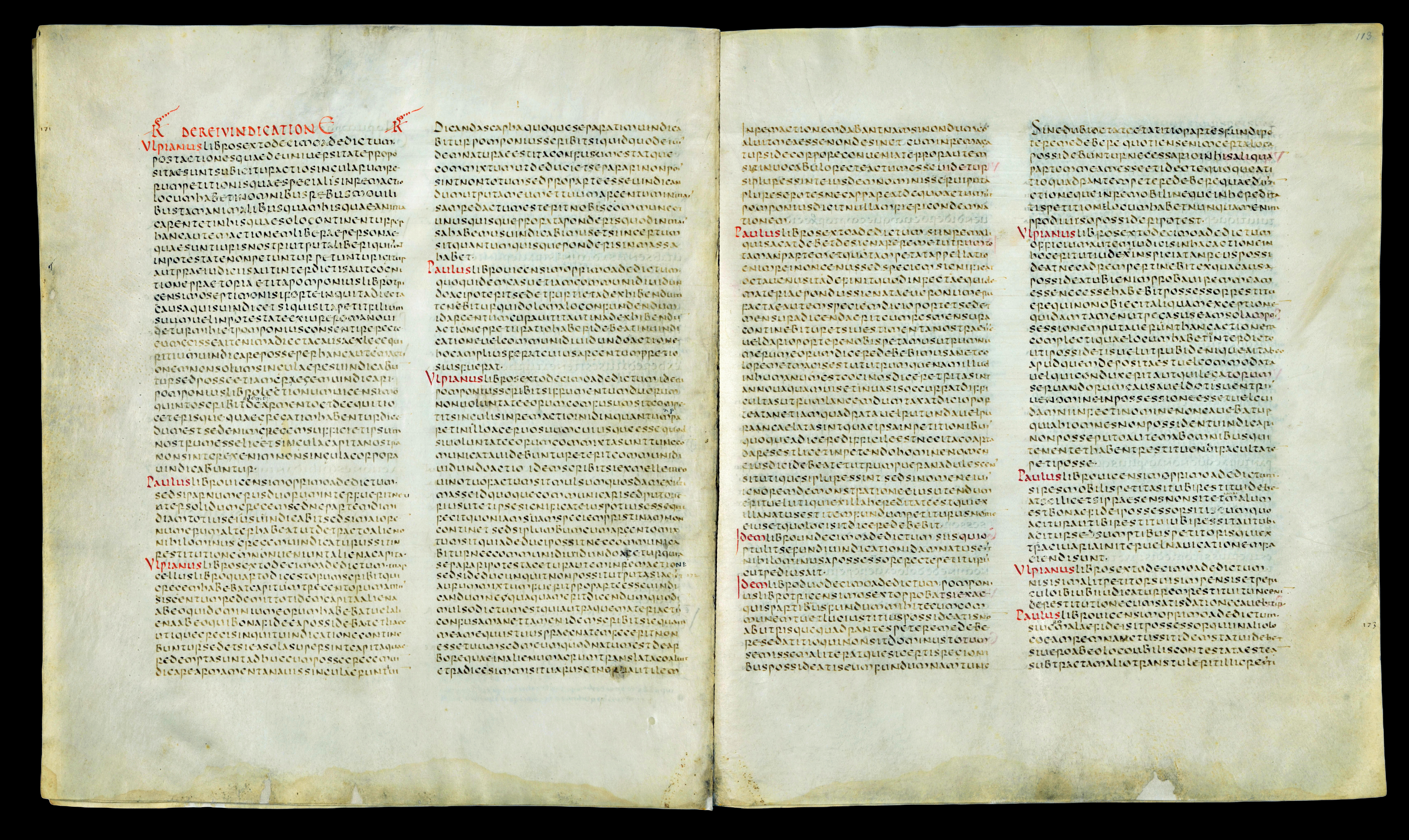
Section about the rei vindicatio from the codex.

The parchment codex called Littera Florentina (or Codex Florentinus) is the closest surviving version of the official Digest of Roman law promulgated by Justinian I in 530–533.

The codex, consisting of 907 leaves, is written in the Byzantine-Ravenna uncials characteristic of Constantinople, but which has recently been recognized in legal and literary texts produced in Alexandria and the Levant as well. E.A. Lowe refers to this script as "b-r uncial". Upon closer examination, the manuscript is believed to have been created between the official issuance in 533 and the issuance of 557, which included Justinian's recent enactments known as the Novellae Constitutiones or "New Constitutions", making it an all-but contemporary and all-but official source.

Marginal notes suggest that the codex was in Amalfi, which was part of the Byzantine territory in Italy governed by the Exarchate of Ravenna in the 6th century. It is believed to have then passed to Pisa in the 12th century. Consequently, during the Middle Ages, the codex was known as the Littera Pisana. Later, as part of the war booty taken from Pisa to Florence after the war of 1406, the codex became part of Florence's collection.

The manuscript became one of Florence's most treasured possessions, and it was only shown to very important individuals. Scholarly access was difficult. It took more than three centuries before a reliable edition of the Littera Florentina was finally made available. Nowadays, two facsimile editions are available for scholars to study.

The manuscript's significance lies in the fact that it is an almost unique witness of the original Justinianian Digest. Most medieval manuscripts of the Digest contain substantially different texts. The sudden reappearance of the manuscript in the late eleventh or early twelfth century has been the subject of much debate among legal historians.

== See also ==
- Corpus Juris Civilis
- Byzantine law
- Glossators

== Notes ==
Enrico Spagnesi, Le Pandette di Giustiniano: storia e fortuna della 'Littera Florentina': mostra di codici documenti, (exhibition catalogue) June–August 1983 (Florence: Olschki) 1983.

== Bibliography ==
- Bernardo Moraes, Manual de Introdução ao Digesto, São Paulo, YK Editora, 2017. ISBN 978-85-68215-22-7
