= Libri Feudorum =

The Libri Feudorum is a twelfth-century collection, originating in Lombardy, of feudal customs. The work gained wide acceptance as a statement of the various rules governing the relation of lord and vassal. Later in the century it was integrated into civil law. It is an example of the increased rationalization of the law in the high Middle Ages.

Its integration by civilians into the larger corpus of civil law demonstrates the interaction of Roman law concepts with local law. J. G. A. Pocock noted that "Lombard feudalism possessed, in the Libri Feodorum, the only written systematization of feudal law that had become part of the general legal heritage of Europe."
