= Odofredus =

Italian Jurist

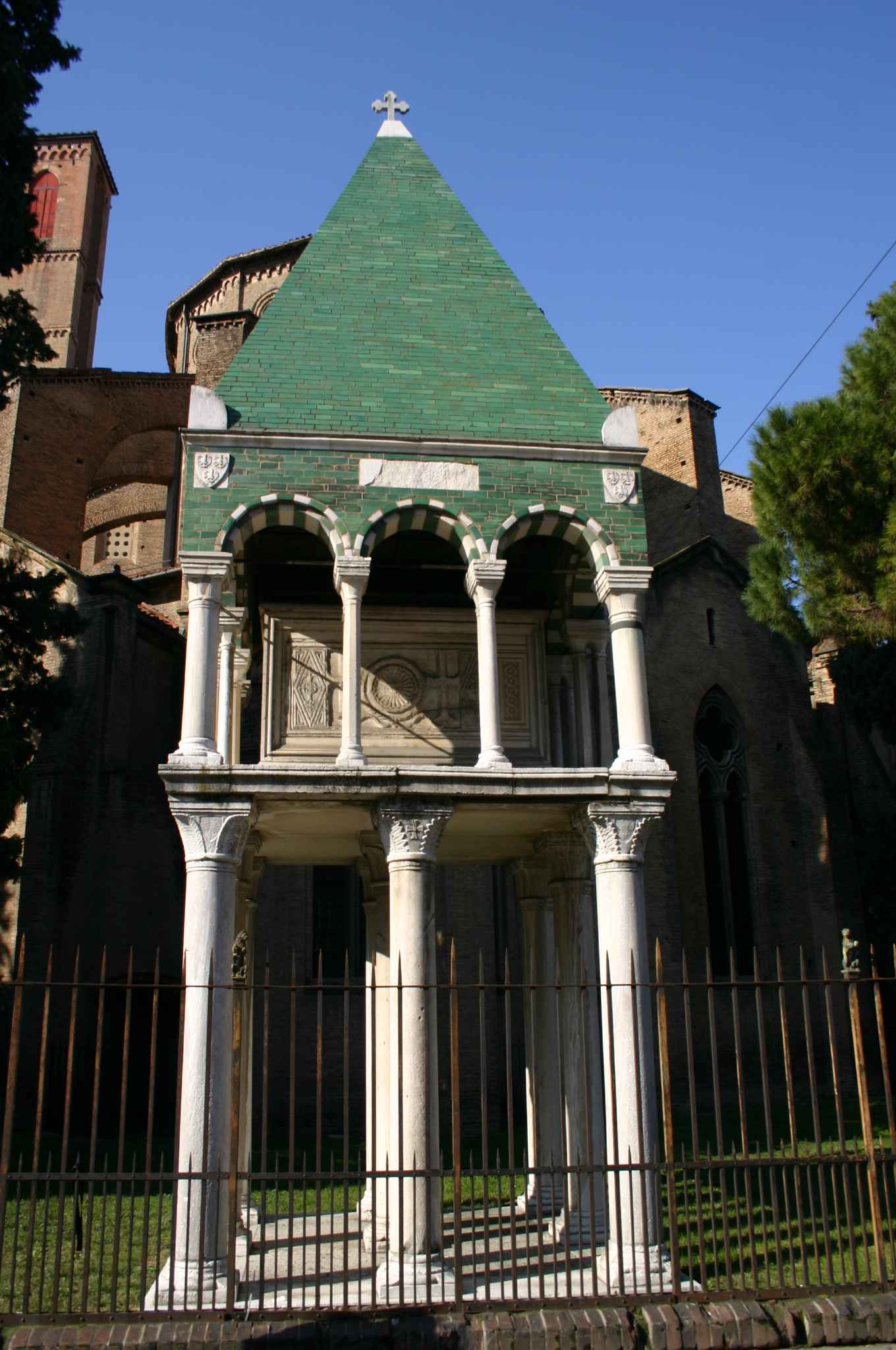
Odofredus' grave at San Francesco church, Bologna, Italy.

Odofredus (died 3 December 1265) was an Italian jurist. He was born in Ostia and moved to Bologna, studying law under Jacobus Balduinus and Franciscus Accursius. After working as an advocate in Italy and France, he became a law professor in Bologna in 1228. The commentaries on Roman law attributed to him are valuable as showing the growth of the study of law in Italy, and for their biographical details of the jurists of the 12th and 13th centuries. Odofredus died at Bologna in 1265.

Odofredus is famous for the personal remarks with which he sprinkled his teaching, often introduced by Or signori, "Listen, gentlemen". Perhaps his most famous saying is: "Everybody wants to know, but nobody wants to know the price of knowledge."

== Works ==
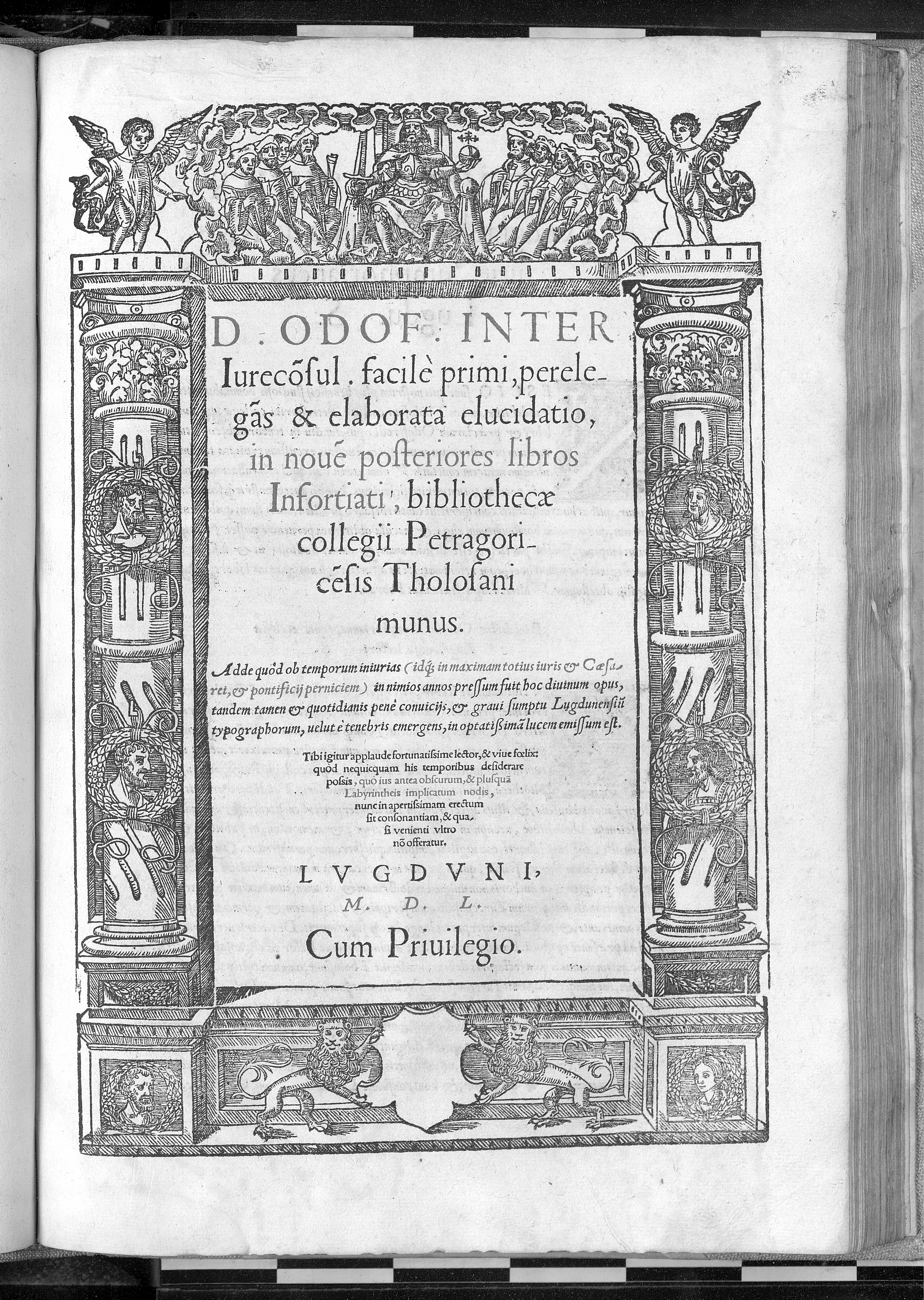
Elucidatio in novem posteriores libros Infortiati, 1550

Under his name appeared the following works, which had already been printed in the late fifteenth century:

- Lecturae in Codicem (Lyons, 1480)
- Lecturae in Digestum Vetus (Paris, 1504)
- Summa de libellis formandis (Strassburg, 1510)
- Lecturae in Tres Libros (Venice, 1514)
- Elucidatio in novem posteriores libros Infortiati (in Latin). Vol. 1. Lyon: Compagnie des libraires. 1550.
- Lecturae in Digestum Novum (Lyons, 1552)
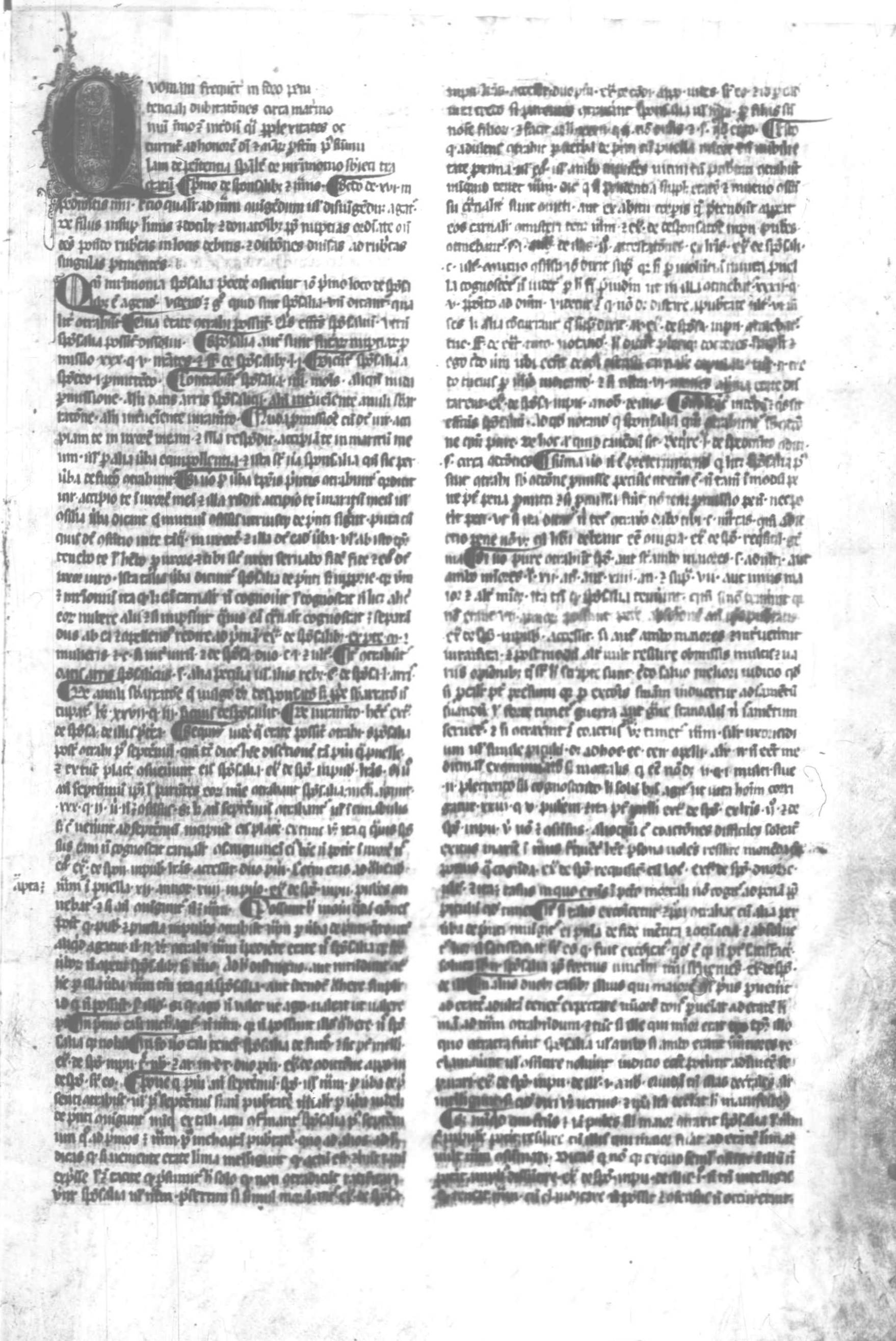
Summa de libellis formandis, 13th-century manuscript. Würzburg, Universitätsbibliothek, Handschriften, M. p. j. f. 7, ff. 13r-18r.
