= Dominium mundi =

Pope-Emperor conflict in the Middle Ages

Dominium mundi is the idea of universal dominion developed in the Middle Ages. Inspired by the memory of the Roman Empire, dominium mundi implied the recognition of one supreme authority, which generated a prolonged political and spiritual struggle between imperial and ecclesiastical power. This struggle can be said to have begun with the Investiture Controversy, and was mainly embodied by the Holy Roman Empire and Catholic Church, which elevated the emperor and the Pope, respectively, to the status of supreme ruler.

The idea of universal dominion divided Italy into the warring faction of Guelphs and Ghibellines. Guelphs supported the Church, while the Ghibellines supported the Empire. After two hundred years of division during the 12th and 13th centuries, neither one of the powers had prevailed, due to their mutual dependency and the rise of the powerful and practically independent reigns of Church and the State. The idea of dominium mundi did not reappear in its original form, despite the fact that both universal powers subsisted.

== The imperial idea ==
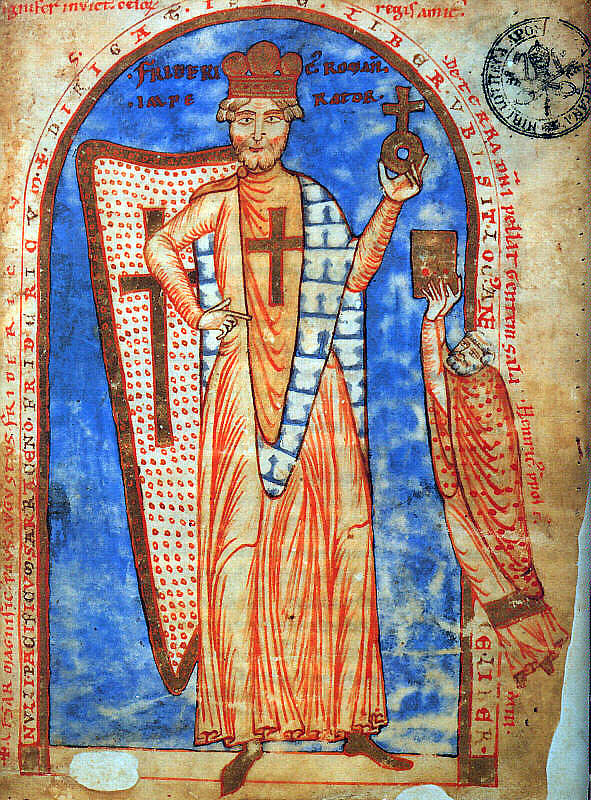
Frederick I, Holy Roman Emperor, emperor of the Holy Roman Empire between 1152 and 1190, was the biggest figure of imperialism in the first stage of the dispute over Dominium Mundi.

=== Height and sustenance ===
During the reign of Frederick I (1152–1190), the imperial idea had already reached maturity. Its continuity was emphasized in Europe from the Roman times, through the link to the Carolingian Empire. In fact, Frederick I spoke about Charlemagne as the model of emperors and had him canonized in 1165 without the requirements. The thesis on the public sovereignty that Roman law (rediscovered by the European jurists and politicians in the twelfth century) has were also used in favor of the imperialist ideals. It was of them that it was deduced the oneness and the universal character of the Holy Roman Empire, considered "a project of worldwide dominion" that symbolized the whole period. Given these premises, it was believed in the court of Frederick I that the Empire, was sacred as it was established directly by divine will to act as a form of political organization for humanity. The expression Sacrum Imperium appears for the first time in a document of 1157.

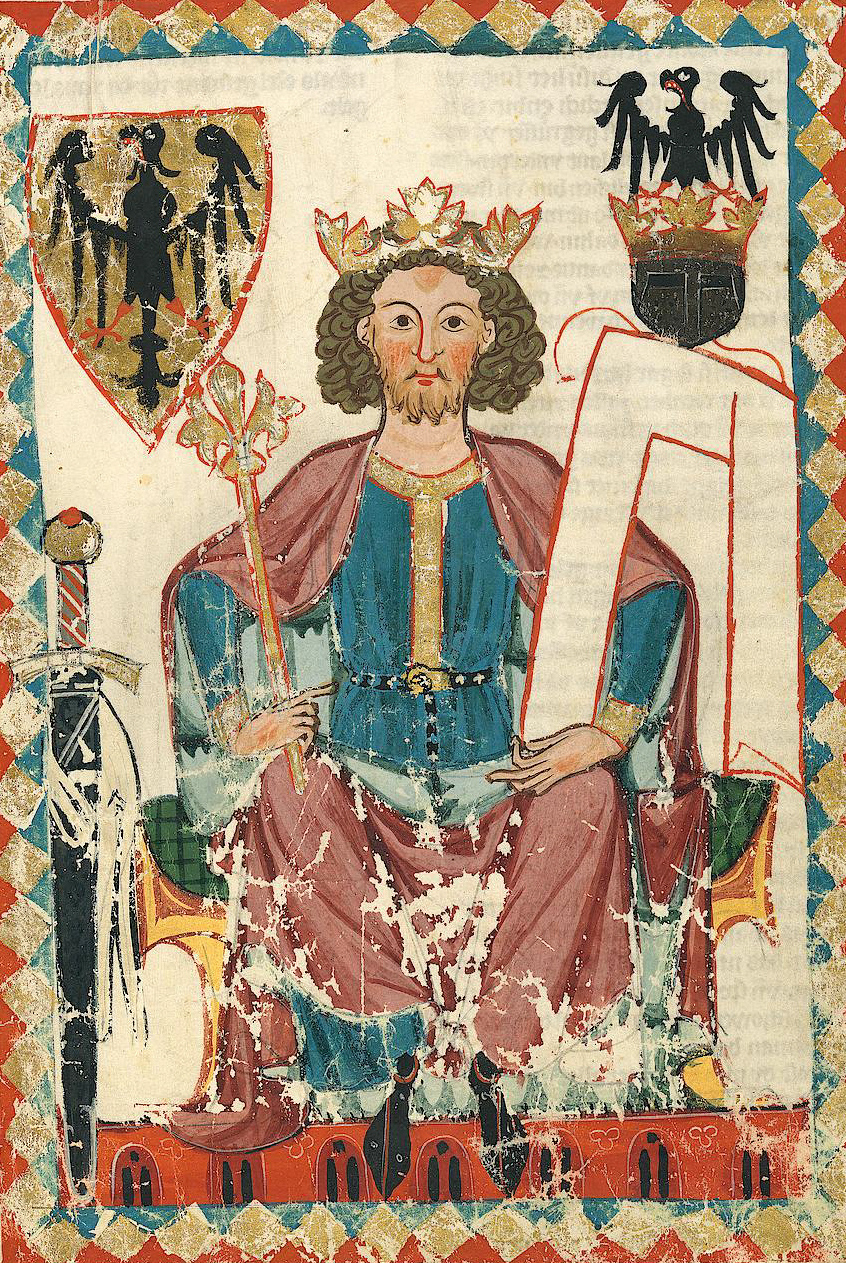
Portrait of Henry VI from the Codex Manesse (folio 6r, ca. 1300)

Notwithstanding, it cannot be forgotten that the 12th century saw the beginning of the revitalization of the monarchic power over feudalism, after several centuries of deep decay of royal authority. The Empire did not stay at the margin of this evolution instead recovering strongly its prestige. Nevertheless, it was badly managed, causing important consequences for the political future of the territories of Germany and Italy. The reconstruction of the monarchies also went against the projected Dominium Mundi. Because of this, Frederick I, as well as his son and successor Henry VI, tried to conciliate both events imagining a universal temporal empire, at whose front was an emperor with supreme authority, superior to the power of various kings, called "régulos" or "local kings". This supreme authority seemed necessary, because it was believed that the Empire was the way to maintain unity in Christianity in preparation for the end times. Without considering this eschatological and messianic element, one cannot correctly understand what the Empire meant for the men of the time, in particular for emperor Frederick I.

== The vision of the Church ==
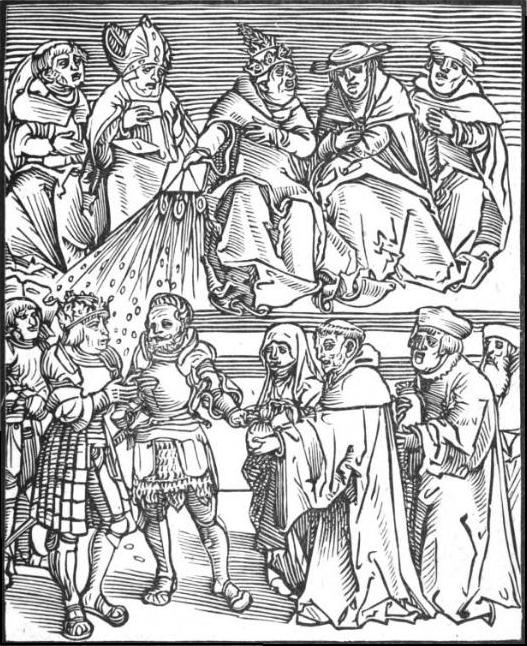
Antichristus, a woodcut by Lucas Cranach of the pope using the temporal power to grant authority to a generously contributing ruler

The foundations of the ecclesiastical vision can be exemplified by these sources:

- According to Pope Alexander III: "The oneness of the creation also implies the oneness of the supreme authority on all the creatures. This had to belong to the Pope because of the superiority of his spiritual power and because the eternal salvation, that he promoted, was the prime social aim. "
- According to Summa Coloniensis (1170 text): "The Pope is the true emperor, the emperor being his effective vicar." (imperator Papa verus est, imperator est vicarius eius).
- According to Geroh de Reichersberg and the great canon lawyers like Gratian and Huguccio: "The lay temporary power had independent operation, being able to choose those who exerted it either by means of election or inheritance, as well as to develop its own administrative means without interferences. The Pope conserved, however, a supreme authority, but he could only exert it to sanction or to authenticate the political acts, not to stop or modify them nor to directly act, except for moral or religious reasons (ratione peccati: "because of sins") or when it was necessary to dissolve an issue for which no other power of the world was authorized."

== Imperial and ecclesiastical law in the 12th and 13th centuries ==
=== Roman law ===
In the 12th and 13th centuries the rediscovery of old Roman law and the ordenación of the canon law sparked a new era for the legal ordering of the western world. This deeply influenced the politics of the time, especially in the course of the struggle of the Dominium Mundi between the Empire and the Pontificate. The Roman law known by the medieval Europe was exclusively the compilation made by the emperor Justinian in the 6th century, which consists of several differentiated parts:

1. The Digest or Pandectas, compendium of jurisprudence.
2. The Institutions or a manual of study which, in part, summarizes the previous one.
3. The "Justinian Code", that reunites all the constitutions by the emperors starting from the times of Hadrian.
4. The Novels, or imperial constitutions after the year 53.

Bologna University seal. Bolognian teachers commented the Justinian texts through the glosses, favoring the empire.

Of all these, the one of greatest influence in the medieval rediscovery was the Digest. The Justinian work would, starting in the 16th century, be known as Corpus Iuris Civilis, but at the time it lacked diffusion and was known through compendiums that deformed it. The renaissance in Roman studies during the 12th and 13th centuries that would influence all of Europe, occurred in Bologna, a city in the Italian Romagna. It wasn't small, in this diffusion, the role of the romano-Germanic emperors, who were moved by their political interests as much as by their supposed condition of successors to the old Roman Empire. The teachers of this most famous "school of Bologna" acted according to a method of medieval study, the one of glosses or commentary of the content and meaning of justinian texts. They are not critical commentaries, but rather, analytical. The bolognian professors accept justinian law as something superior, even supreme; they are limited to comment on it, without too much critical baggage, because for that they needed philological command of Greek language and study of original texts and historical knowledge, in which they were lacking. But from their commentary fundamental consequences for the Europe of the time are deduced, by the creation of a rich casuistry that covered a field of superior and more ample legal hypothesis from what was widely known until then. The foundation of this school of bolognian professors is due to Irnerius at the beginning of the 12th century. Disciples of his were Hugo de Porta Ravennate, Bulgarus, Jacobus de Boragine and Martinus Gosia, called "the four doctors" because of their wisdom and influences. All of them were Ghibellines (supported the idea of the Empire being over the pontificate) and in favor of Frederick I, of whom they were contemporary.

=== Canon law ===
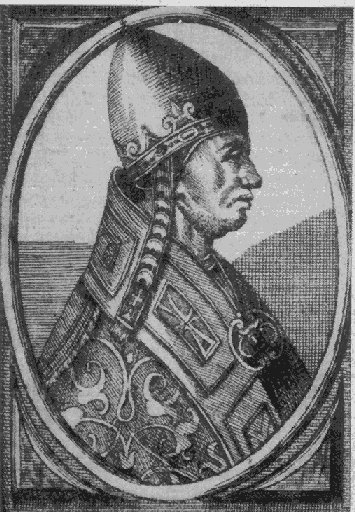
Pope Alexander III was one of the main glossists of the Decree of pontifical Graciano and Decretals, playing a decisive role in the fight with the Holy Roman Empire.

Around the same time, with some decades of difference, a systematization of the ecclesiastical law took place, which was going to give birth to the canon law in all its fullness. Romanists and canon lawyers were brothers of mentality and duties, although the later defended the pontifical rights. The first one to compile and systematize the previous universal council canons was Graciano, a theology teacher from bologna, who wrote ca. 1140 his Concordance of the Discordances of the Canons, commonly called Decree. The work of Graciano did not have official status, but it reached great prestige and caused in the following decades a height in legal consultations formulated to the pontiff s, something to be expected at a time of insufficient organization of the civil power. These answered by means of litteras decretals or "decretals", whose compilation became necessary, as the only way to use and preserve the judiciary wealth they had, since they not only affected ecclesiastical matters, but also those of civilians and secular people.

The first compilation was made by Raymond of Peñafort, a Dominican Catalan, and is named Gregory IX Decretals; it reunites the decretals appeared between 1154 and 1234 and is divided in five books, this being the reason the following compilation, which includes material up until 1298, was known Liber sextus ("Sixth book"). In the 14th century new compilations were made, Clementines, and the Extravagantes, of John XXII and Comunas. From the 16th century on, all canon law in its recognized compendiums will take the official name of Corpus iuris canonici. Tee Decree of pontifical Graciano and the Decretals were commented by the same procedure of glosses as was applied to the Roman law. Some of the main glossists played a decisive role in the struggle against the Empire: Rolando Bandinelli (Pope Alexander III) and Sinibaldo Fieschi (Pope Innocent IV). The synthesis of the glosses was made, mainly, by Bartholomew de Brescia, in the 12th century, and also by Juan the Teutónico, in the 13th century, of Hugh of Pisa and Henry of Segusio.

== Development of the conflict ==
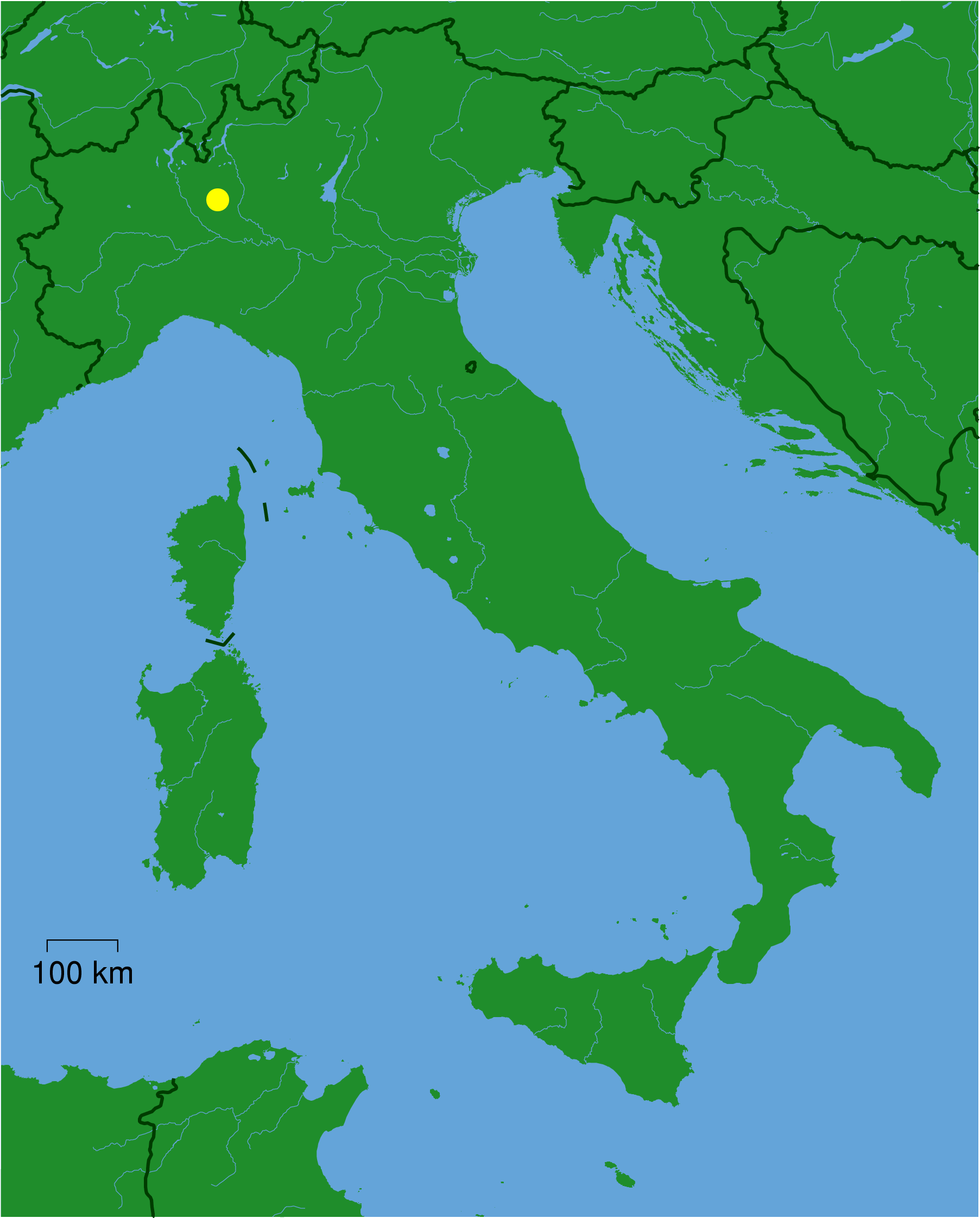
In varied occasions the cities of Lombardy, headed by Milan, revolted to the imperial authority, approaching the Papacy.

=== The diet of Besançon and the first differences ===
On his return from Italy, after being crowned Holy Roman Emperor by Pope Adrian IV, Frederick I summoned a diet in Besançon (1157), with object to reform the political statute of his kingdom in Arles. In that diet the first differences between the high civil employees of the emperor, in special took place the chancellor Rainaldo de Dassel, and the pontifical legacy, and future Pope Alexander III, Rolando Bandinelli. The complaint between theocrats and avivava, being the pretext the interpretation of a papal document in which it was alluded to the "benefits" that Pontiff granted to emperor. The word "benefit", in that then, had a very specific meaning, because vassals were the ones who received benefits or fiefs from their lord. To thus Rainaldo de Dassel understood it and, put forth the argument that, Rolando Bandinelli did not gain a disadvantage in accepting the thesis of its rival: in effect, for him, the emperor received the Empire as a "benefit" of the Pope. Adrian IV, the Pope of English origin that crowned emperor Frederick I, clarified later that the word had a more general sense: the Pope granted spiritual benefits, not fiefdoms. But the complaint had been revived, and when Rolando Bandinelli was raised to the pontifical seat as Alexander III, it was as a true restorer of papal authority (in the spirit of Pope Gregory VII). Theories that no longer had the energetic simplicity of the Gregorian times. In first half of the 12th century, mainly, some authors continued the theses of Gregory VII, like Hugo of San Victor, John of Salisbury or Honorio Augustodunense, but the predominant theories assimilate in some form the new realities: rediscovery of the Roman Law, affirmation of the political powers, complication of the social scheme in a world in which the possible offices and individual situations are multiplied, breaking the primitive ideal of the "trinitarian society" (politicians, the military and agriculturists).

=== Frederick I against Alexander III ===
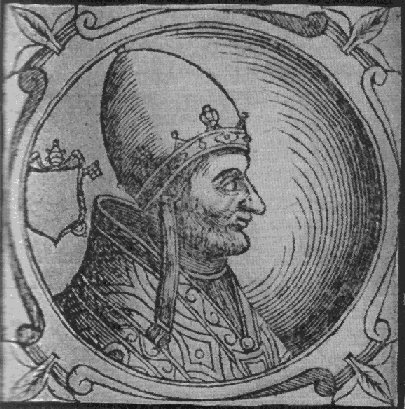
After the death of Adrian IV, 24 cardinals choose the Pope Alexander III. Nevertheless, Frederick I recognized like Pope Victor IV (Antipope).

In 1158 took place the second travels imperial to Italy. Shortly after, the death of Adrian IV opened a successory crisis in the pontificate. Around both facts the first propitious conjuncture for the confrontation between emperor and Pope takes place. Frederick tried to subjugate the Lombard cities. Milan was raised at the top of this new urban world. The emperor besieged it and forced it to capitulate, preserving its internal autonomy but accepting totally the imperial authority. Next, Frederick reunited to one magna assembly in Roncaglia with the purpose of reorganizing the administration of the kingdom of Italy and recovering in him all his authority. It seemed to obtain it, but the resistance against its measures would raise to the cities and would renew its old "entente" with the Pontiff, for whom the constitution of an imperial power hard in the north and center of Italy was more serious the immediate danger against its political independence.

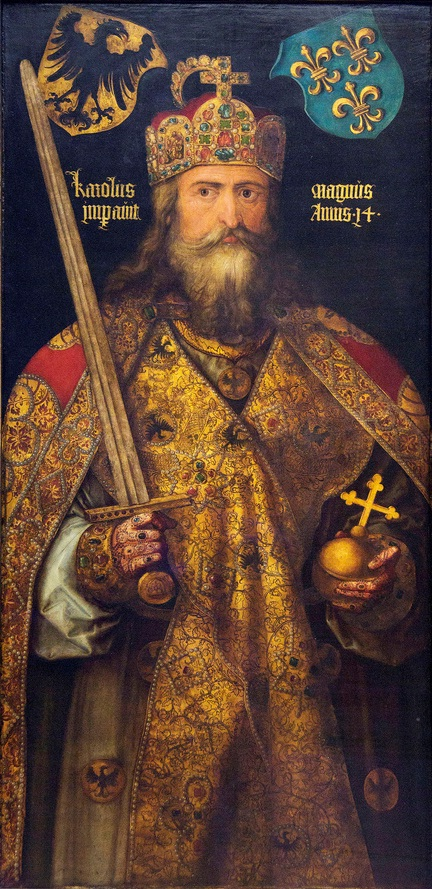
The pseudocanonization of Charlemagne was an example of the culmination of imperial interventionism.

==== Pope and antipope ====
When Adrian IV died, the 24 cardinals in favor of opposing the dominion of Frederick I in Italy chose Pope Alexander III, while the three that preferred to reconcile gave their vote to cardinal Octavian, who was titled Victor IV. The split allowed Frederick to attempt a conciliation in Pavia (January 1160), where Pope Victor IV was recognized, while Alexander III looked for support in the Norman kingdom of the south of Italy, whose kings were vassals of The Holy See, and in other European countries, to foment opposition against the emperor. Milan again revolted in 1161, but it was conquered by force of arms and devastated; shortly after, Alexander III was forced to divide for France. Frederick won, but Alexander was the Pope recognized by Europe, except for the Empire, and, even so, he counted within this one frightful allies, in particular in Italy, where the emperor and his chancellors, Rainaldo de Dassel and Christian de Bach, organized authoritarian government to counter the old local autonomies, that were not resigned to accept their new lot without resistance.

==== Culmination of the imperial intervention ====
The death of Victor IV also deprived Frederick of an important support, because antipopes that made choose to happen to him (Paschal III, Callixtus III) did not have possible justification nor were recognized willingly by his own German clergy, since the Emperor took advantage of the circumstances to intervene himself in the ecclesiastical life like at the worse moments of "Investiture Controversy": In 1165, synod of Würzburg and Canonization of Charlemagne was the culmination of imperial interventionism. In addition, the dispute with Alexander III forced him to make concessions and to obtain alliances in Germany as well as in other countries. Great German nobles made Frederick pay dearly for their fidelity and, in the outside, Frederick looked for so much the French alliance, never obtained, like the English, taking advantage of the existing fight between the king Henry II of England and the Archbishop of Canterbury, Thomas Becket.

== Pontificate and Empire at the time of Frederick I ==
1152: Frederick succeeds Conrad III. First conflict with the Pope. The Scandinavian churches are separated from Hamburg.

1153: Treaty of Constance between Frederick and Eugene III.

1154: Frederick in Italy; decree of Roncaglia. Violence against the Italian communes. Adrian IV, the Pope.

1155: Imperial coronation of Frederick. Revolt of Rome and retreat of the emperor, who restitutes Bavaria to Henry the Lion. Alliance between Adrian IV and William I of Sicily. Concordato de Benevento. Austria, independent countship.

1157: Assembly of Besançon. Rupture between emperor and the Pope.

1158: Shaken and punishment of Milan. Diet of Roncaglia.

1159: New revolt of Milan. Siege of Crema, Italy. Death of Adrian IV. Alexander III, Pope, and Victor IV, antipope.

1160: Storming and destruction of Crema. Beginning of the siege of Milan. Assembly of Pavia.

1162: Taking and destruction of Milan. Alliance of Frederick with Pisa and Genoa against William I of Sicily. Project of interview between Frederick and Louis VII of France to end the schism. Thomas Becket, archbishop of Canterbury.

1162 - 1165: The German clergy happens to the party of Alexander III.

1163: Council of Tours.

1164: Venice forms the so-called League of Verona against Frederick. Death of the antipope Victor IV, happening Paschal III to him.

1165: Diet of Würzburg. Persecution against those in favor of Alexander III. Henry II of England breaks with Alexander III and recognizes Paschal III.

1167: Frederick seizes Rome. Formation of Lombard League, that is allied to the one of Verona.

1168: Foundation of Alessandria in Piedmont by the cities lombardas in honor of Alexander III. Death of Paschal III.

1170: Lombard League is put under the protection of Alexander III. Negotiations of Veroli between the Pope and the emperor.

1174 - 1175: Siege of Alessandria by Frederick.

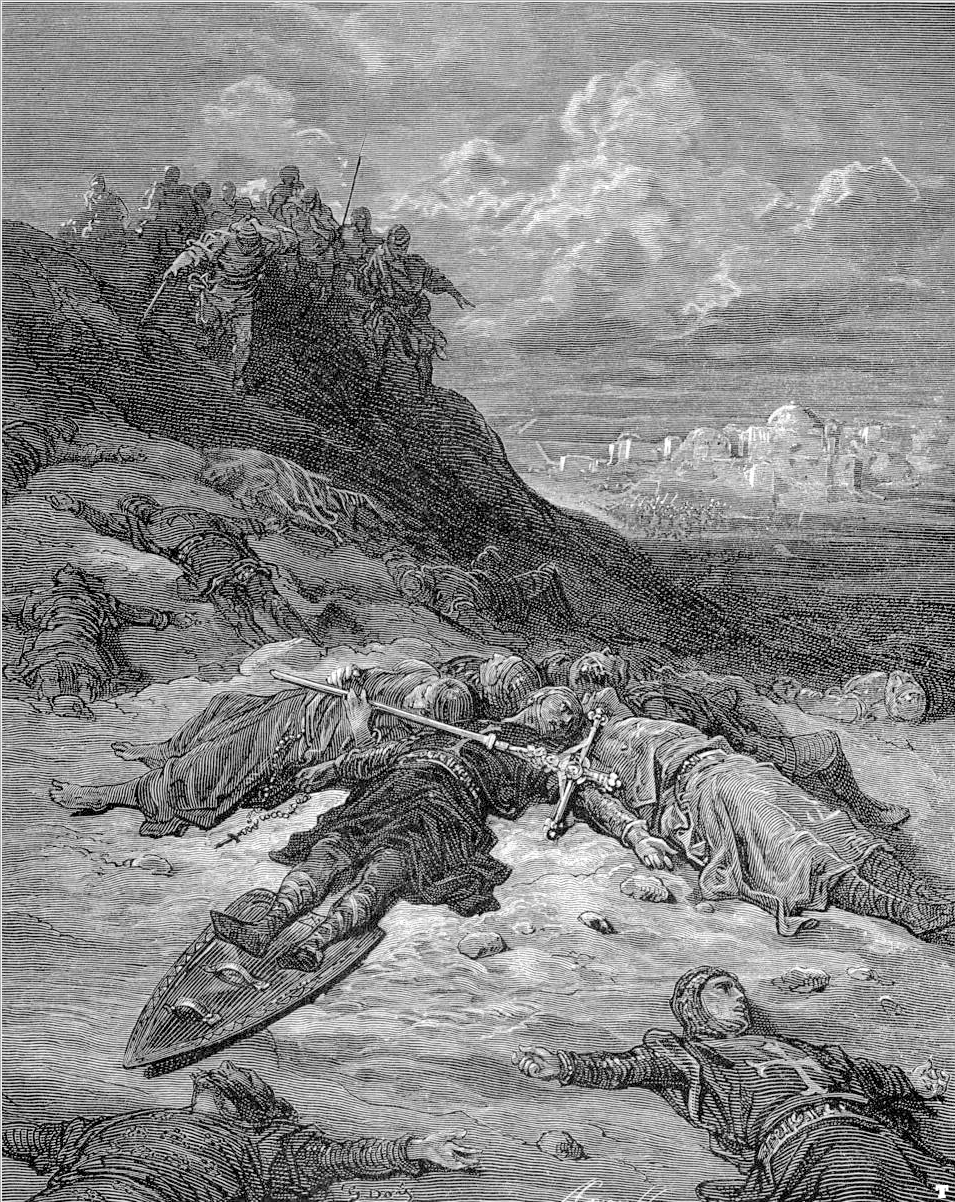
"The Death of Federico of Germany" by Gustave Doré

1175: Truce of Montebello.

1176: Frederick is defeated at the Battle of Legnano by the Italian communes. Conversations of Agnani with Pope Alexander III.

1177: Peace of Venice.

1179: Rupture between the emperor and Henry the Lion. I conciliate of Letrán: reorganization of the papal election.

1180: War against Henry the Lion.

1181: Reconciliation between Frederick and Henry the Lion. Death of Alexander III.

1183: Preliminaries of Plasencia and peace of Constanza.

1184: Diet of Mainz: wedding of Henry and Constance of Sicily. Diet of Verona.

1185: Alliance between Frederick and Milan.

1186: Rupture between Urban and Frederick. Assembly of Gelnhausen.

1188: Reconciliation of the Pope with the Roman commune.

1189: Reconciliation between Pope and emperor. Death of William II of Sicily; it happens the son of the emperor and future to him Enrique IV.

1190: Third Crusade: death of Frederick in Asia Minor.

== Involved Personages ==
(in chronological order)

=== Imperial ===
- Henry IV, Holy Roman Emperor
- Henry V, Holy Roman Emperor
- Frederick I, Holy Roman Emperor
- Henry VI, Holy Roman Emperor
- Frederick II, Holy Roman Emperor

=== Papal ===
- Pope Gregory VII
- Pope Urban II
- Pope Paschal II
- Pope Urban III
- Pope Alexander III
- Pope Innocent IV

== See also ==
- Hierocracy (medieval)
- Holy Roman Empire
- Investiture Controversy
- Norman Anonymous
