= William of Tyre =

Archbishop of Tyre (c. 1130 – 1186)

- Archbishop of Tyre
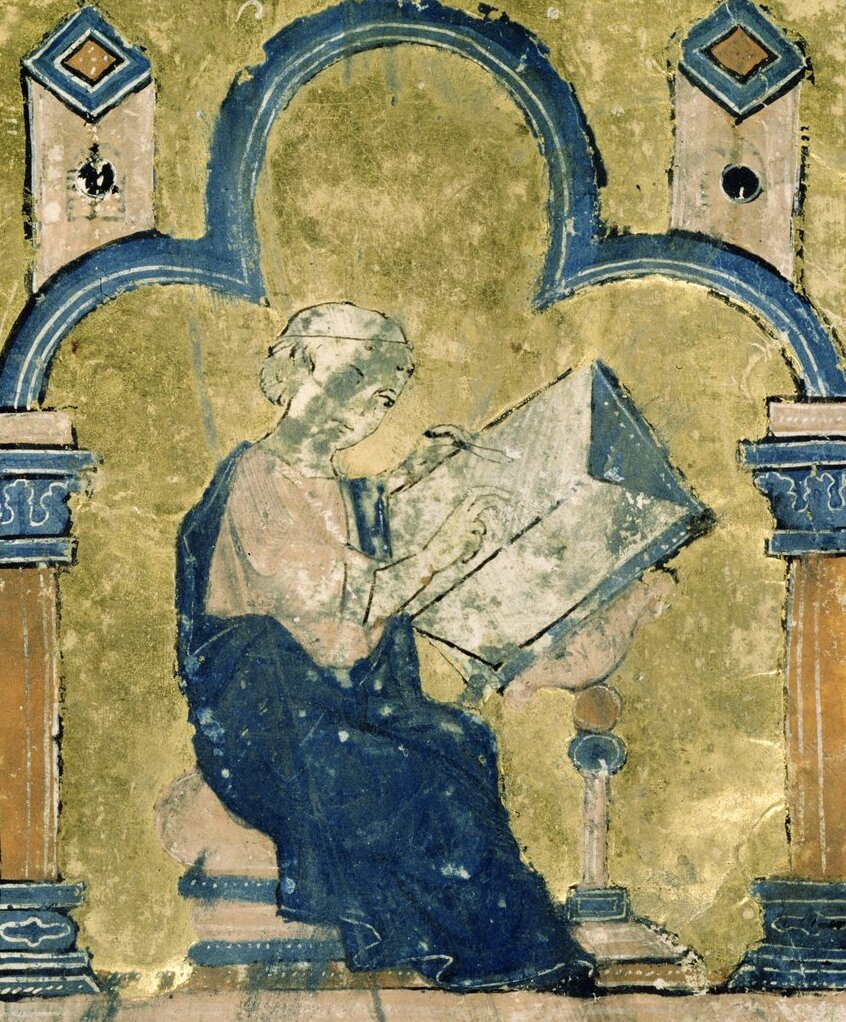
- William of Tyre writing his history, from a 13th-century Old French translation
- Elected: 6 June 1175
- Term ended: 29 September 1186
- Predecessor: Frederick de la Roche
- Successor: Joscius, Archbishop of Tyre

Personal details
- Born: 1130 Jerusalem, Kingdom of Jerusalem
- Died: 29 September 1186 (aged 55–56) Tyre, Kingdom of Jerusalem
- Denomination: Roman Catholicism
- Occupation: Medieval chronicler, chancellor

William of Tyre (Latin: Willelmus Tyrensis; c. 1130 – 29 September 1186) was a medieval prelate and chronicler. As archbishop of Tyre, he is sometimes known as William II to distinguish him from his predecessor, William I, the Englishman, a former prior of the Church of the Holy Sepulchre, who was Archbishop of Tyre from 1127 to 1135. He grew up in Jerusalem at the height of the Kingdom of Jerusalem, which had been established in 1099 after the First Crusade, and he spent twenty years studying the liberal arts and canon law in the universities of Europe.

Following William's return to Jerusalem in 1165, King Amalric made him an ambassador to the Byzantine Empire. William became tutor to the king's son, the future King Baldwin IV, whom William discovered to be a leper. After Amalric's death, William became chancellor and archbishop of Tyre, two of the highest offices in the kingdom, and in 1179 William led the eastern delegation to the Third Council of the Lateran. As he was involved in the dynastic struggle that developed during Baldwin IV's reign, his importance waned when a rival faction gained control of royal affairs. He was passed over for the prestigious Patriarchate of Jerusalem, and died in obscurity, probably in 1186.

William wrote an account of the Lateran Council and a history of the Islamic states from the time of Muhammad, neither of which survives. He is famous today as the author of a historical chronicle of the Kingdom of Jerusalem. William composed his chronicle in excellent Latin for his time, with numerous quotations from classical literature. The chronicle is sometimes given the title Historia rerum in partibus transmarinis gestarum ("History of Deeds Done Beyond the Sea") or Historia Ierosolimitana ("History of Jerusalem"), or the Historia for short. It was translated into French soon after his death, and thereafter into numerous other languages. Because it is the only source for the history of twelfth-century Jerusalem written by a native, historians have often assumed that William's statements could be taken at face value. However, more recent historians have shown that William's involvement in the kingdom's political disputes resulted in detectable biases in his account. Despite this, he is considered the greatest chronicler of the crusades, and one of the best authors of the Middle Ages.

== Early life ==
The Crusader states in 1165

The Kingdom of Jerusalem was founded in 1099 at the end of the First Crusade. It was the third of four Christian territories to be established by the crusaders, following the County of Edessa and the Principality of Antioch, and followed by the County of Tripoli. Jerusalem's first three rulers, Godfrey of Bouillon (1099–1100), his brother Baldwin I (1100–1118), and their cousin Baldwin II (1118–1131), expanded and secured the kingdom's borders, which encompassed roughly the same territory as modern-day Israel, Palestine, and Lebanon. During the kingdom's early decades, the population was swelled by pilgrims visiting the holiest sites of Christendom. Merchants from the Mediterranean city-states of Italy and France were eager to exploit the rich trade markets of the east.

William's family probably originated in either France or Italy, since he was very familiar with both countries. His parents were likely merchants who had settled in the kingdom and were "apparently well-to-do", although it is unknown whether they participated in the First Crusade or arrived later. William was born in Jerusalem around 1130. He had at least one brother, Ralph, who was one of the city's burgesses, a non-noble leader of the merchant community. Nothing more is known about his family, except that his mother died before 1165.

As a child William was educated in Jerusalem, at the cathedral school in the Church of the Holy Sepulchre. The scholaster, or school-master, John the Pisan, taught William to read and write, and first introduced him to Latin. From the Historia it is clear that he also knew French and possibly Italian, but there is not enough evidence to determine whether he learned Greek, Persian, and Arabic, as is sometimes claimed.

Around 1145 William went to Europe to continue his education in the schools of France and Italy, especially in those of Paris and Bologna, "the two most important intellectual centers of twelfth-century Christendom." These schools were not yet the official universities that they would become in the 13th century, but by the end of the 11th century both had numerous schools for the arts and sciences. They were separate from the cathedral schools, and were established by independent professors who were masters of their field of study. Students from all over Europe gathered there to hear lectures from these masters. William studied liberal arts and theology in Paris and Orléans for about ten years, with professors who had been students of Thierry of Chartres and Gilbert de la Porrée. He also spent time studying under Robert of Melun and Adam de Parvo Ponte, among others. In Orléans, one of the pre-eminent centres of classical studies, he read ancient Roman literature (known simply as "the Authors") with Hilary of Orléans, and learned mathematics ("especially Euclid") with William of Soissons. For six years, he studied theology with Peter Lombard and Maurice de Sully. Afterwards, he studied civil law and canon law in Bologna, with the "Four Doctors", Hugo de Porta Ravennate, Bulgarus, Martinus Gosia, and Jacobus de Boragine. William's list of professors "gives us almost a who's who of the grammarians, philosophers, theologians, and law teachers of the so-called Twelfth-Century Renaissance", and shows that he was as well-educated as any European cleric. His contemporary John of Salisbury had many of the same teachers.

== Religious and political life in Jerusalem ==
The highest religious and political offices in Jerusalem were usually held by Europeans who had arrived on pilgrimage or crusade. William was one of the few natives with a European education, and he quickly rose through the ranks. After his return to the Holy Land in 1165, he became canon of the cathedral at Acre. In 1167 he was appointed archdeacon of the cathedral of Tyre by Frederick de la Roche, archbishop of Tyre, with the support of King Amalric.

Amalric had come to power in 1164 and had made it his goal to conquer Egypt. Egypt had been invaded by King Baldwin I fifty years earlier, and the weak Fatimid Caliphate was forced to pay yearly tribute to Jerusalem. Amalric turned towards Egypt because Muslim territory to the east of Jerusalem had fallen under the control of the powerful Zengid sultan Nur ad-Din. Nur ad-Din had taken control of Damascus in 1154, six years after the disastrous siege of Damascus by the Second Crusade in 1148. Jerusalem could now expand only to the southwest, towards Egypt, and in 1153 Ascalon, the last Fatimid outpost in Palestine, fell to the crusaders. Nur ad-Din, however, also wished to acquire Egypt, and sent his army to hinder Amalric's plans. This was the situation in the east when William returned from Europe. In 1167 Amalric married Maria Comnena, grand-niece of Byzantine emperor Manuel I Comnenus, and in 1168 the king sent William to finalize a treaty for a joint Byzantine-crusader campaign against Egypt. The expedition, Amalric's fourth, was the first with support from the Byzantine navy. Amalric, however, did not wait for the fleet to arrive. He managed to capture Damietta, but within a few years he was expelled from Egypt by one of Nur ad-Din's generals, Saladin, who would later become Jerusalem's greatest threat.

Meanwhile, William continued his advancement in the kingdom. In 1169 he visited Rome, possibly to answer accusations made against him by Archbishop Frederick, although if so, the charge is unknown. It is also possible that while Frederick was away on a diplomatic mission in Europe, a problem within the diocese forced William to seek the archbishop's assistance.

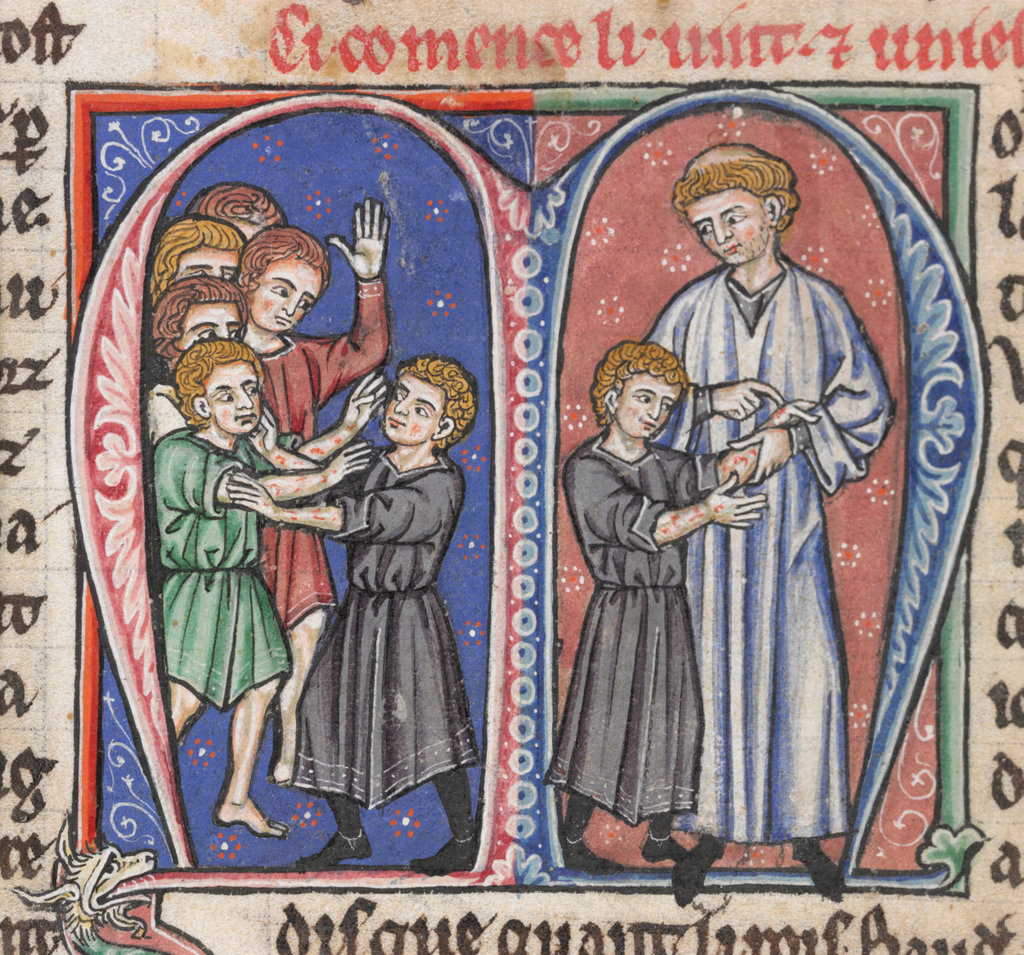
William of Tyre discovers Baldwin's first symptoms of leprosy (MS of L'Estoire d'Eracles (French translation of William of Tyre's Historia), painted in France, 1250s. British Library, London).

On his return from Rome in 1170 he may have been commissioned by Amalric to write a history of the kingdom. He also became the tutor of Amalric's son and heir, Baldwin IV. When Baldwin was thirteen years old, he was playing with some children, who were trying to cause each other pain by scratching each other's arms. "The other boys gave evidence of pain by their outcries," wrote William, "but Baldwin, although his comrades did not spare him, endured it altogether too patiently, as if he felt nothing ... It is impossible to refrain from tears while speaking of this great misfortune." William inspected Baldwin's arms and recognized the possible symptoms of leprosy, which was confirmed as Baldwin grew older.

Amalric died in 1174, and Baldwin IV succeeded him as king. Nur ad-Din also died in 1174, and his general Saladin spent the rest of the decade consolidating his hold on both Egypt and Nur ad-Din's possessions in Syria, which allowed him to completely encircle Jerusalem. The subsequent events have often been interpreted as a struggle between two opposing factions, a "court party" and a "noble party." The "court party" was led by Baldwin's mother, Amalric's first wife Agnes of Courtenay, and her immediate family, as well as recent arrivals from Europe who were inexperienced in the affairs of the kingdom and were in favour of war with Saladin. The "noble party" was led by Raymond III of Tripoli and the native nobility of the kingdom, who favoured peaceful co-existence with the Muslims. This is the interpretation offered by William himself in the Historia, and it was taken as fact by later historians. Peter W. Edbury, however, has more recently argued that William must be considered extremely partisan as he was naturally allied with Raymond, who was responsible for his later advancement in political and religious offices. The accounts of the 13th-century authors who continued the Historia in French must also be considered suspect, as they were allied to Raymond's supporters in the Ibelin family. The general consensus among recent historians is that although there was a dynastic struggle, "the division was not between native barons and newcomers from the West, but between the king's maternal and paternal kin."

Miles of Plancy briefly held the regency for the underaged Baldwin IV. Miles was assassinated in October 1174, and Raymond III was soon appointed to replace him. Raymond named William chancellor of Jerusalem, as well as archdeacon of Nazareth, and on 6 June 1175, William was elected archbishop of Tyre to replace Frederick de la Roche, who had died in October 1174. William's duties as chancellor probably did not take up too much of his time; the scribes and officials in the chancery drafted documents and it may not have even been necessary for him to be present to sign them. Instead he focused on his duties as archbishop. In 1177 he performed the funeral services for William of Montferrat, husband of Baldwin IV's sister Sibylla, when the patriarch of Jerusalem, Amalric of Nesle, was too sick to attend.

In 1179, William was one of the delegates from Jerusalem and the other crusader states at the Third Lateran Council; among the others were Heraclius, archbishop of Caesarea, Joscius, bishop of Acre and William's future successor in Tyre, the bishops of Sebastea, Bethlehem, Tripoli, and Jabala, and the abbot of Mount Sion. Patriarch Amalric and Patriarch of Antioch Aimery of Limoges were unable to attend, and William and the other bishops did not have sufficient weight to persuade Pope Alexander III of the need for a new crusade. William was, however, sent by Alexander as an ambassador to Emperor Manuel, and Manuel then sent him on a mission to the Principality of Antioch. William does not mention exactly what happened during these embassies, but he probably discussed the Byzantine alliance with Jerusalem, and Manuel's protectorate over Antioch, where, due to pressure from Rome and Jerusalem, the emperor was forced to give up his attempts to restore a Greek patriarch. William was absent from Jerusalem for two years, returning home in 1180.

== Patriarchal election of 1180 ==
During William's absence a crisis had developed in Jerusalem. King Baldwin had reached the age of majority in 1176 and Raymond III had been removed from the regency, but as a leper Baldwin could have no children and could not be expected to rule much longer. After the death of William of Montferrat in 1177, King Baldwin's widowed sister Sibylla required a new husband. At Easter in 1180, the two factions were divided even further when Raymond and his cousin Bohemond III of Antioch attempted to force Sibylla to marry Baldwin of Ibelin. Raymond and Bohemond were King Baldwin's nearest male relatives in the paternal line, and could have claimed the throne if the king died without an heir or a suitable replacement. Before Raymond and Bohemond arrived, however, Agnes and King Baldwin arranged for Sibylla to be married to a Poitevin newcomer, Guy of Lusignan, whose older brother Aimery of Lusignan was already an established figure at court.

The dispute affected William, since he had been appointed chancellor by Raymond and may have fallen out of favour after Raymond was removed from the regency. When Patriarch Amalric died on 6 October 1180, the two most obvious choices for his successor were William and Heraclius of Caesarea. They were fairly evenly matched in background and education, but politically they were allied with opposite parties, as Heraclius was one of Agnes of Courtenay's supporters. It seems that the canons of the Holy Sepulchre were unable to decide, and asked the king for advice; due to Agnes' influence, Heraclius was elected. There were rumours that Agnes and Heraclius were lovers, but this information comes from the partisan 13th-century continuations of the Historia, and there is no other evidence to substantiate such a claim. William himself says almost nothing about the election and Heraclius' character or his subsequent patriarchate, probably reflecting his disappointment at the outcome.

== Death ==
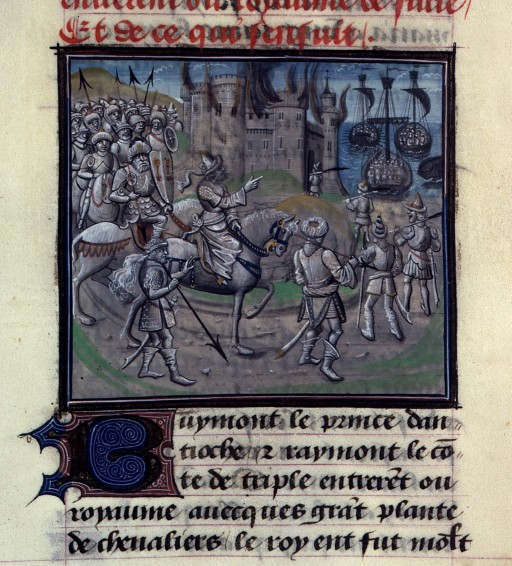
Saladin burning a town, from a manuscript of the French translation of the Historia

William remained archbishop of Tyre and chancellor of the kingdom, but the details of his life at this time are obscure. The 13th-century continuators claim that Heraclius excommunicated William in 1183, but it is unknown why Heraclius would have done this. They also claim that William went to Rome to appeal to the Pope, where Heraclius had him poisoned. According to Peter W. Edbury and John Rowe, the obscurity of William's life during these years shows that he did not play a large political role, but concentrated on ecclesiastical affairs and the writing of his history. The story of his excommunication, and the unlikely detail that he was poisoned, were probably an invention of the Old French continuators. William remained in the kingdom and continued to write up until 1184, but by then Jerusalem was internally divided by political factions and externally surrounded by the forces of Saladin, and "the only subjects that present themselves are the disasters of a sorrowing country and its manifold misfortunes, themes which can serve only to draw forth lamentations and tears."

His importance had dwindled with the victory of Agnes and her supporters, and with the accession of Baldwin V, infant son of Sibylla and William of Montferrat. Baldwin was a sickly child and he died the next year. In 1186 he was succeeded by his mother Sibylla and her second husband Guy of Lusignan, ruling jointly. William was probably in failing health by this point. Rudolf Hiestand discovered that the date of William's death was 29 September, but the year was not recorded; whatever the year, there was a new chancellor in May 1185 and a new archbishop of Tyre by 21 October 1186. Hans E. Mayer concluded that William died in 1186, and this is the year generally accepted by scholars.

William's foresight about the misfortunes of his country was proven correct less than a year later. Saladin defeated King Guy at the Battle of Hattin in 1187, and went on to capture Jerusalem and almost every other city of the kingdom, except the seat of William's archdiocese, Tyre. News of the fall of Jerusalem shocked Europe and plans were made to send assistance. According to Roger of Wendover, William was present at Gisors in France in 1188 when Henry II of England and Philip II of France agreed to go on crusade: "Thereupon the king of the English first took the sign of the cross at the hands of the Archbishop of Rheims and William of Tyre, the latter of whom had been entrusted by our lord the pope with the office of legate in the affairs of the crusade in the western part of Europe." Roger was however mistaken; he knew that an unnamed archbishop of Tyre was present and assumed it must have been the William whose chronicle he possessed, although the archbishop in question was actually William's successor Joscius.

== Works ==
=== Historia ===
==== Latin chronicle ====
In the present work we seem to have fallen into manifold dangers and perplexities. For, as the series of events seemed to require, we have included in this study on which we are now engaged many details about the characters, lives, and personal traits of kings, regardless of whether these facts were commendable or open to criticism. Possibly descendants of these monarchs, while perusing this work, may find this treatment difficult to brook and be angry with the chronicler beyond his just deserts. They will regard him as either mendacious or jealous—both of which charges, as God lives, we have endeavored to avoid as we would a pestilence.

— William of Tyre, prologue to the Historia

William's great work is a Latin chronicle, written between 1170 and 1184. It contains twenty-three books; the final book, which deals with the events of 1183 and the beginning of 1184, has only a prologue and one chapter, so it is either unfinished or the rest of the pages were lost before the whole chronicle began to be copied. The first book begins with the conquest of Syria by Umar in the seventh century, but otherwise the work deals with the advent of the First Crusade and the subsequent political history of the Kingdom of Jerusalem. It is arranged, but was not written, chronologically; the first sections to be written were probably the chapters about the invasion of Egypt in 1167, which are extremely detailed and were likely composed before the Fatimid dynasty was overthrown in 1171. Much of the Historia was finished before William left to attend the Lateran Council, but new additions and corrections were made after his return in 1180, perhaps because he now realized that European readers would also be interested in the history of the kingdom. In 1184 he wrote the Prologue and the beginning of the twenty-third book.

August C. Krey thought William's Arabic sources may have come from the library of the Damascene diplomat Usama ibn Munqidh, whose library was looted by Baldwin III from a shipwreck in 1154. Alan V. Murray, however, has argued that, at least for the accounts of Persia and the Turks in his chronicle, William relied on Biblical and earlier medieval legends rather than actual history, and his knowledge "may be less indicative of eastern ethnography than of western mythography." William had access to the chronicles of the First Crusade, including Fulcher of Chartres, Albert of Aix, Raymond of Aguilers, Baldric of Dol, and the Gesta Francorum, as well as other documents located in the kingdom's archives. He used Walter the Chancellor and other now-lost works for the history of the Principality of Antioch. From the end of Fulcher's chronicle in 1127, William is the only source of information from an author living in Jerusalem. For events that happened in William's own lifetime, he interviewed older people who had witnessed the events about which he was writing, and drew on his own memory.

William's classical education allowed him to compose Latin superior to that of many medieval writers. He used numerous ancient Roman and early Christian authors, either for quotations or as inspiration for the framework and organization of the Historia. His vocabulary is almost entirely classical, with only a few medieval constructions such as "loricator" (someone who makes armour, a calque of the Arabic "zarra") and "assellare" (to empty one's bowels). He was capable of clever word-play and advanced rhetorical devices, but he was prone to repetition of a number of words and phrases. His writing also shows phrasing and spelling which is unusual or unknown in purely classical Latin but not uncommon in medieval Latin, such as:

- confusion between reflexive and possessive pronouns;
- confusion over the use of the accusative and ablative cases, especially after the preposition in;
- collapsed diphthongs (i.e. the Latin diphthongs ae and oe are spelled simply e);
- the dative "mihi" ("to me") is spelled "michi";
- a single "s" is often doubled, for example in the adjectival place-name ending which he often spells "-enssis"; this spelling is also used to represent the Arabic "sh", a sound which Latin lacks, for example in the name Shawar which he spells "Ssauar".

==== Literary themes and biases ====
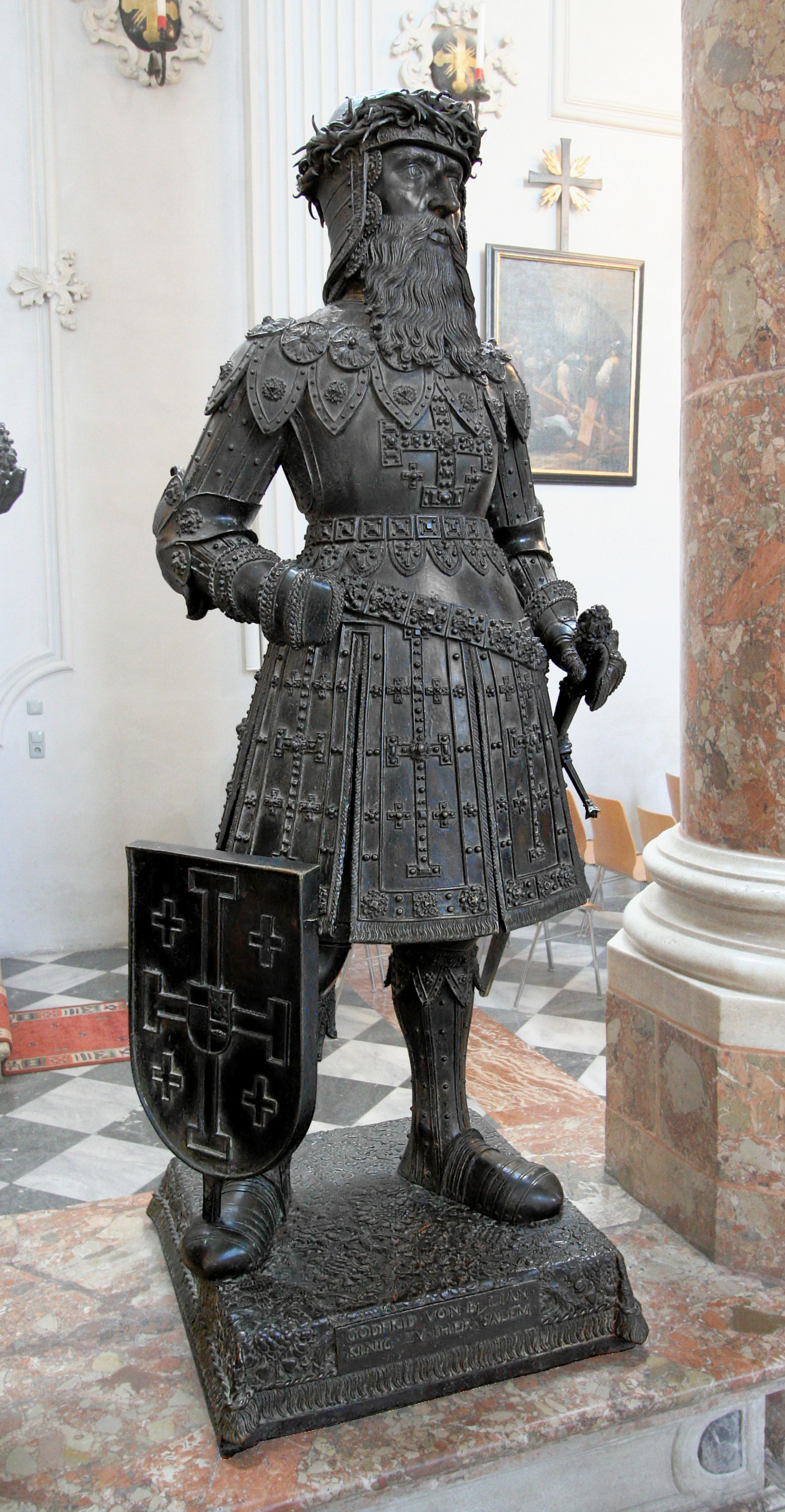
Sixteenth-century bronze statue of Godfrey of Bouillon from the group of heroes surrounding the memorial to Maximilian I, Holy Roman Emperor in the Hofkirche, Innsbruck. By William's time, Godfrey was seen as the heroic leader of the First Crusade, and his strength and virtue had become legendary.

Despite his quotations from Christian authors and from the Bible, William did not place much emphasis on the intervention of God in human affairs, resulting in a somewhat "secular" history. Nevertheless, he included much information that is clearly legendary, especially when referring to the First Crusade, which even in his own day was already considered an age of great Christian heroes. Expanding on the accounts of Albert of Aix, Peter the Hermit is given prominence in the preaching of the First Crusade, to the point that it was he, not Pope Urban II, who originally conceived the crusade. Godfrey of Bouillon, the first ruler of crusader Jerusalem, was also depicted as the leader of the crusade from the beginning, and William attributed to him legendary strength and virtue. This reflected the almost mythological status that Godfrey and the other first crusaders held for the inhabitants of Jerusalem in the late twelfth century.

William gave a more nuanced picture of the kings of his own day. He claimed to have been commissioned to write by King Amalric himself, but William did not allow himself to praise the king excessively; for example, Amalric did not respect the rights of the church, and although he was a good military commander, he could not stop the increasing threat from the neighbouring Muslim states. On a personal level, William admired the king's education and his interest in history and law, but also noted that Amalric had "breasts like those of a woman hanging down to his waist" and was shocked when the king questioned the resurrection of the dead.

About Amalric's son Baldwin IV, however, "there was no ambiguity". Baldwin was nothing but heroic in the face of his debilitating leprosy, and he led military campaigns against Saladin even while still underaged; William tends to gloss over campaigns where Baldwin was not actually in charge, preferring to direct his praise towards the afflicted king rather than subordinate commanders. William's history can be seen as an apologia, a literary defence, for the kingdom, and more specifically for Baldwin's rule. By the 1170s and 1180s, western Europeans were reluctant to support the kingdom, partly because it was far away and there were more pressing concerns in Europe, but also because leprosy was usually considered divine punishment.

William was famously biased against the Knights Templar, whom he believed to be arrogant and disrespectful of both secular and ecclesiastical hierarchies, as they were not required to pay tithes and were legally accountable only to the Pope. Although he was writing decades later, he is the earliest author to describe the actual foundation of the Templar order. He was generally favourable towards them when discussing their early days, but resented the power and influence they held in his own time. William accused them of hindering the siege of Ascalon in 1153; of poorly defending a cave-fortress in 1165, for which twelve Templars were hanged by King Amalric; of sabotaging the invasion of Egypt in 1168; and of murdering Assassin ambassadors in 1173.

Compared to other Latin authors of the twelfth century, William is surprisingly favourable to the Byzantine Empire. He had visited the Byzantine court as an official ambassador and probably knew more about Byzantine affairs than any other Latin chronicler. He shared the poor opinion of Alexius I Comnenus that had developed during the First Crusade, although he was also critical of some of the crusaders' dealings with Alexius. He was more impressed by Alexius' son John II Comnenus; he did not approve of John's attempts to bring the crusader Principality of Antioch under Byzantine control, but John's military expeditions against the Muslim states, the common enemy of both Greeks and Latins, were considered admirable. Emperor Manuel, whom William met during his visits to Constantinople, was portrayed more ambivalently, much like King Amalric. William admired him personally, but recognized that the Empire was powerless to help Jerusalem against the Muslim forces of Nur ad-Din and Saladin. William was especially disappointed in the failure of the joint campaign against Egypt in 1169. The end of the Historia coincides with the massacre of the Latins in Constantinople and the chaos that followed the coup of Andronicus I Comnenus, and in his description of those events, William was certainly not immune to the extreme anti-Greek rhetoric that was often found in Western European sources.

As a medieval Christian author William could hardly avoid hostility towards the kingdom's Muslim neighbours, but as an educated man who lived among Muslims in the east, he was rarely polemical or completely dismissive of Islam. He did not think Muslims were pagans, but rather that they belonged to a heretical sect of Christianity and followed the teachings of a false prophet. He often praised the Muslim leaders of his own day, even if he lamented their power over the Christian kingdom; thus Muslim rulers such as Mu'in ad-Din Unur, Nur ad-Din, Shirkuh, and even Jerusalem's ultimate conqueror Saladin are presented as honourable and pious men, characteristics that William did not bestow on many of his own Christian contemporaries.

==== Circulation of the chronicle ====
After William's death the Historia was copied and circulated in the crusader states and was eventually brought to Europe. In the 13th century, James of Vitry had access to a copy while he was bishop of Acre, and it was used by Guy of Bazoches, Matthew Paris, and Roger of Wendover in their own chronicles. However, there are only ten known manuscripts that contain the Latin chronicle, all of which come from France and England, so William's work may not have been very widely read in its original form. In England, however, the Historia was expanded in Latin, with additional information from the Itinerarium Regis Ricardi, and the chronicle of Roger Hoveden; this version was written around 1220.

It is unknown what title William himself gave his chronicle, although one group of manuscripts uses Historia rerum in partibus transmarinis gestarum and another uses Historia Ierosolimitana. The Latin text was printed for the first time in Basel in 1549 by Nicholas Brylinger; it was also published in the Gesta Dei per Francos by Jacques Bongars in 1611 and the Recueil des historiens des croisades (RHC) by Auguste-Arthur Beugnot and Auguste Le Prévost in 1844, and Bongars' text was reprinted in the Patrologia Latina by Jacques Paul Migne in 1855. The now-standard Latin critical edition, based on six of the surviving manuscripts, was published as Willelmi Tyrensis Archiepiscopi Chronicon in the Corpus Christianorum in 1986, by R. B. C. Huygens, with notes by Hans E. Mayer and Gerhard Rösch. The RHC edition was translated into English by Emily A. Babcock and August C. Krey in 1943 as "A History of Deeds Done Beyond the Sea," although the translation is sometimes incomplete or inexact.

==== Old French translation ====
A translation of the Historia into Old French, made around 1223, was particularly well-circulated and had many anonymous additions made to it in the 13th century. In contrast to the surviving Latin manuscripts, there are "at least fifty-nine manuscripts or fragments of manuscripts" containing the Old French translation. There are also independent French continuations attributed to Ernoul and Bernard le Trésorier. The translation was sometimes called the Livre dou conqueste; it was known by this name throughout Europe as well as in the crusader Kingdom of Cyprus and in Cilician Armenia, and 14th-century Venetian geographer Marino Sanuto the Elder had a copy of it. The French was further translated into Spanish, as the Gran conquista de Ultramar, during the reign of Alfonso the Wise of Castile in the late 13th century. The French version was so widespread that the Renaissance author Francesco Pipino translated it back into Latin, unaware that a Latin original already existed. A Middle English translation of the French was made by William Caxton in the 15th century.

=== Other works ===
William reports that he wrote an account of the Third Council of the Lateran, which does not survive. He also wrote a history of the Holy Land from the time of Muhammad up to 1184, for which he used Eutychius of Alexandria as his main source. This work seems to have been known in Europe in the 13th century but it also does not survive.

== Modern assessment ==
William's depiction of Baldwin IV as a hero is an attempt "to vindicate the politics of his own party and to blacken those of its opponents." William was opposed to Baldwin's mother Agnes of Courtenay, Patriarch Heraclius, and their supporters; his interpretation of events during Baldwin's reign and his neutrality as an historian was often taken for granted until the late twentieth century. August C. Krey, for example, believed that "his impartiality ... is scarcely less impressive than his critical skill." His view of events was perpetuated by mid-twentieth century historians Marshall W. Baldwin, Steven Runciman, and Hans Eberhard Mayer.

Despite this excellent reputation, more recent re-evaluations of this period by D. W. T. C. Vessey, Peter Edbury and Bernard Hamilton have undone much of William's influence. Vessey has shown that William was certainly not an impartial observer, especially when dealing with the events of the 1170s and 1180s. Vessey believes that William's claim to have been commissioned by Amalric is a typical ancient and medieval topos, or literary theme, in which a wise ruler, a lover of history and literature, wishes to preserve for posterity the grand deeds of his reign. William's claims of impartiality are also a typical topos in ancient and medieval historical writing. An often-noted flaw in the Historia is William's poor memory for dates. "Chronology is sometimes confused, and dates are given wrongly", even for basic information such as the regnal dates of the kings of Jerusalem. For example, William gives the date of Amalric's death as 11 July 1173, when it actually occurred in 1174.

Despite his biases and errors, William "has always been considered one of the greatest medieval writers." Runciman wrote that "he had a broad vision; he understood the significance of the great events of his time and the sequence of cause and effect in history." Christopher Tyerman calls him "the historian's historian", and "the greatest crusade historian of all," and Bernard Hamilton says he "is justly considered one of the finest historians of the Middle Ages". As the Dictionary of the Middle Ages says, "William's achievements in assembling and evaluating sources, and in writing in excellent and original Latin a critical and judicious (if chronologically faulty) narrative, make him an outstanding historian, superior by medieval, and not inferior by modern, standards of scholarship."

== Sources ==
=== Primary ===
- William of Tyre, A History of Deeds Done Beyond the Sea, trans. E.A. Babcock and A.C. Krey. Columbia University Press, 1943.

=== Secondary ===
- Andressohn, John Carl (1947). The Ancestry and Life of Godfrey of Bouillon. Indiana University Publications, Social Science Series 5.
- Babbitt, Susan M. (1989). "William of Tyre". In Strayer, Joseph (ed.). Dictionary of the Middle Ages. Vol. 12. New York: Charles Scribner's Sons.
- Marshall W. Baldwin, "The Decline and Fall of Jerusalem, 1174–1189." A History of the Crusades (gen. ed. Kenneth M. Setton), vol. 1: The First Hundred Years (ed. Marshall W. Baldwin). University of Wisconsin Press, 1969.
- Barber, Malcolm (1993). The Trial of the Templars. Cambridge University Press.
- Frederic Duncalf, "The First Crusade: Clermont to Constantinople." A History of the Crusades (gen. ed. Kenneth M. Setton), vol. 1: The First Hundred Years (ed. Marshall W. Baldwin). University of Wisconsin Press, 1969.
- Peter W. Edbury and John G. Rowe, "William of Tyre and the Patriarchal election of 1180." The English Historical Review 93 (1978), repr. Kingdoms of the Crusaders: From Jerusalem to Cyprus (Aldershot: Ashgate, Variorum Collected Series Studies, 1999), pp. 1–25.
- Edbury, Peter W.; Rowe, John G. (1988). William of Tyre: Historian of the Latin East. Cambridge University Press.
- Peter W. Edbury, "Propaganda and faction in the Kingdom of Jerusalem: the background to Hattin." Crusaders and Muslims in Twelfth-Century Syria, ed. Maya Shatzmiller (Leiden: Brill, 1993), repr. in Kingdoms of the Crusaders: From Jerusalem to Cyprus (Aldershot: Ashgate, Variorum Collected Series Studies, 1999), pp. 173–189.
- Hamilton, Bernard (2000). The Leper King and his Heirs. Cambridge University Press.
- Charles Homer Haskins, The Renaissance of the Twelfth Century. Harvard University Press, 1927; repr. Meridian Books, 1966.
- Huygens, R. B. C. (1962). "Guillaume de Tyr étudiant: un chapître (XIX, 12) de son Histoire retrouvé". Latomus (in French). 21 (4): 811–829.
- Huygens, R. B. C. (1984). "Editing William of Tyre". Sacris Erudiri. 27 (1): 461–473.
- G. A. Loud and J. W. Cox, "The 'Lost' Autobiographical Chapter of William of Tyre's Chronicle (Book XIX.12)." The Crusades: An Encyclopedia, ed. Alan V. Murray (ABC-Clio, 2006), vol. 4, Appendix: Texts and Documents #4, pp. 1305–1308.
- Mayer, Hans E. (1988). The Crusades. Translated by Gillingham, John (2nd ed.). Oxford University Press.
- Alan V. Murray, "William of Tyre and the origin of the Turks: on the sources of the Gesta Orientalium Principum," in Dei gesta Per Francos: Études sur les crioisades dédiées à Jean Richard/Crusade Studies in Honour of Jean Richard, edd. Michel Balard, Benjamin Z. Kedar and Jonathan Riley-Smith (Aldershot: Ashgate, 2001), pp. 217–229.
- Murray, Alan V. (2006). "William of Tyre.". In Murray, Alan V. (ed.). The Crusades: An Encyclopedia. Vol. 4. ABC-Clio.
- Nicholson, Helen J. (1999). "William of Tyre.". In Boyd, Kelly (ed.). Encyclopedia of Historians and Historical Writing. Vol. 2. Taylor & Francis.
- Runciman, Steven (1951). A History of the Crusades. Vol. 1: The First Crusade and the Foundation of the Kingdom of Jerusalem. Cambridge University Press.
- Runciman, Steven (1952). A History of the Crusades. Vol. 2: The Kingdom of Jerusalem and the Frankish East. Cambridge University Press.
- Schwinges, R. C. (2001). "William of Tyre, the Muslim Enemy, and the Problem of Tolerance.". In Gervers, Michael; Powell, James M. (eds.). Tolerance and Intolerance. Social Conflict in the Age of the Crusades. Syracuse University Press.
- Tyerman, Christopher (1998). The Invention of the Crusades. University of Toronto Press.
- Tyerman, Christopher (2006). God's War: A New History of the Crusades. Penguin.
- Verger, Jacques (1992). "The birth of the universities". In de Ridder-Symoens, Hilde (ed.). A History of the University in Europe. Vol. 1: Universities in the Middle Ages. Cambridge University Press. pp. 47–55.
- Vessey, D. W. T. C. (1973). "William of Tyre and the art of historiography". Mediaeval Studies. 35 (1): 433–455.

Religious titles
Preceded by Frederick	Archbishop of Tyre; 1175–1185	Succeeded by Joscius
