= Bulgarus =

Italian legal scholar (d. 1166)

Bulgarus was a twelfth-century Italian jurist, born in Bologna.

He was the most celebrated of the famous Four Doctors of the law school of the University of Bologna and was regarded as the Chrysostom of the Glossators, being frequently designated by the title of the "Golden Mouth" (os aureum). He died in 1166 at a very advanced age.

According to popular tradition, all four of the famous Four Doctors (Bulgarus, Martinus Gosia, Hugo de Porta Ravennate and Jacobus de Boragine) were pupils of Irnerius; however, while there is currently no insuperable difficulty in substantiating this claim with regard to Bulgarus, Friedrich Carl von Savigny considered the evidence to be insufficient to support this claim. Martinus Gosia and Bulgarus were the chiefs of two opposite schools at Bologna, corresponding in many respects to the Proculians and Sabinians of Imperial Rome, Martinus being at the head of a school that accommodated the law in a manner that his opponents referred to as the "equity of the purse" (aequitas bursalis), whilst Bulgarus adhered more closely to the letter of the law. Bulgarus' school ultimately prevailed. Joannes Bassianus, Azo and Accursius all numbered amongst its notable adherents, each of whom, in turn, went on to exercise a commanding influence over the course of legal studies in Bologna.

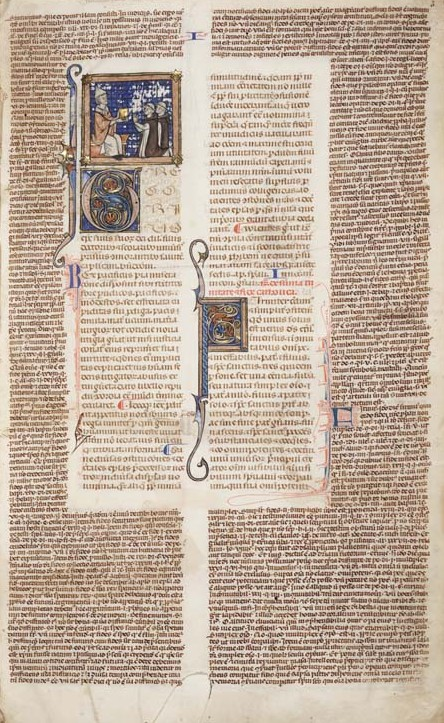
Decretals with Glossa ordinaria

At the Diet of Roncaglia in 1158, Bulgarus assumed the leading role amongst the Four Doctors, and was one of the most trusted advisors to the emperor Frederick I. His most celebrated work is a notable commentary, De Regulis Juris, which was at one time printed amongst the writings of Placentinus. However, this commentary has since been properly credited to its true author, Cujacius, based on internal evidence contained in the additions annexed to it, which were undoubtedly penned by Placentinus himself. This commentary is the earliest extant work of its kind emanating from the school of the Glossators. According to Savigny, it is a model specimen of the excellence of the method introduced by Irnerius, and a striking example of the brilliant results obtained in a short period of time by virtue of a constant, exclusive study of the sources of law.

== See also ==
- Four Doctors of Bologna
