= Four Doctors of Bologna =

12th-century Italian jurists

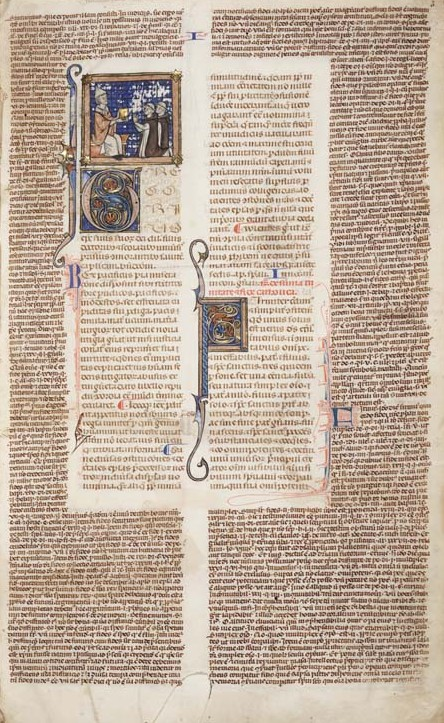
Decretals with Glossa ordinaria

The Four Doctors of Bologna (Latin: Quatuor Doctores) were Italian jurists and glossators of the 12th century, based in the University of Bologna: Bulgarus, Martinus Gosia, Jacobus de Boragine and Hugo de Porta Ravennate.

Their teachings in the law school of Bologna were based on glosses and commentaries on the rediscovered Corpus juris civilis of Justinian. Martinus may have studied with the founder of legal scholarship in Bologna, Irnerius. The revived importance of Roman law, in the form of medieval Roman law, embodied by the Quattuor Doctores made its first impact in the political arena in 1158, when they gave their support to Frederick Barbarossa's Diet of Roncaglia in his conflict with the Italian communes over imperial rights in Lombardy.

Of the four, the strongest contrast in interpretations of the revived Roman law were Bulgarus and Martinus. Bulgarus took the law at face value and applied the narrowest interpretation, the ius strictum; Martinus, on the other hand, applied the legal principle of aequitas, "equity" or "equivalence", which permitted broad latitude in extending Roman principles to modern situations. The followers of Bulgarus, the Bulgari, held sway in Bologna in the following generation, as nostri doctores ("our doctors"), while the followers of Martinus, the Gosiani, taught particularly in southern France. The form of Questiones, questions and answers on the principles of law, rather than glosses on specific texts, was the particular contribution of Hugo.

In the 13th century, the combined tradition of the doctores bononienses were summarized in the form of a glossa ordinaria of Roman law, compiled by Accursius.
