= Half-proof =

Concept in medieval Roman law

Half-proof (semiplena probatio) was a concept of medieval Roman law, describing a level of evidence between mere suspicion and the full proof (plena probatio) needed to convict someone of a crime. The concept was introduced by the Glossators of the 1190s such as Azo, who gives such examples as a single witness or private documents.

In cases where there was half-proof against a defendant, he might be allowed to take an oath as to his innocence, or he might be sent for torture to extract further evidence that could complete the burden of proof.

Sir Matthew Hale, the leading late 17th-century English jurist, wrote:

The evidence at Law which taken singly or apart makes but an imperfect proof, semiplena probatio, yet in conjunction with others grows to a full proof, like Silurus his twigs, that were easily broken apart, but in conjunction or union were not to be broken.

However, the concept never became firmly established in English law.

Voltaire claimed that the Parlement of Toulouse dealt not only in half-proofs but in quarter-proofs and eighth-proofs, but there is no direct evidence of that.

In later times, half-proof was mentioned in 19th century Scots law and in the 1917 Catholic Code of Canon Law.
