= Glossator =

Medieval school of Roman law

The scholars of the 11th- and 12th-century legal schools in Italy, France and Germany are identified as glossators in a specific sense. They studied Roman law based on the Digesta, the Codex of Justinian, the Authenticum (an abridged Latin translation of selected constitutions of Justinian, promulgated in Greek after the enactment of the Codex and therefore called Novellae), and his law manual, the Institutiones Iustiniani, compiled together in the Corpus Iuris Civilis. (This title is itself only a sixteenth-century printers' invention.) Their work transformed the inherited ancient texts into a living tradition of medieval Roman law.

The glossators conducted detailed text studies that resulted in collections of explanations. For their work they used a method of study unknown to the Romans themselves, insisting that contradictions in the legal material were only apparent. They tried to harmonize the sources in the conviction that for every legal question only one binding rule exists. Thus they approached these legal sources in a dialectical way, which is a characteristic of medieval scholasticism. They sometimes needed to invent new concepts not found in Roman law, such as half-proof (evidence short of full proof but of some force, such as a single witness). In other medieval disciplines, for example theology and philosophy, glosses were also made on the main authoritative texts.

In the Greek language, γλῶσσα (glossa) means "tongue" or "language." Originally, the word was used to denote an explanation of an unfamiliar word, but its scope gradually expanded to the more general sense of "commentary". The glossators used to write in the margins of the old texts (glosa marginalis) or between the lines (glosa interlinearis - interlinear glosses). Later these were gathered into large collections, first copied as separate books, but also quickly written in the margins of the legal texts. The medieval copyists at Bologna developed a typical script to enhance the legibility of both the main text and the glosses. The typically Bolognese script is called the Littera Bononiensis.

Accursius's Glossa ordinaria, the final standard redaction of these glosses, contains around 100,000 glosses. Accursius worked for decades on this task. There exists no critical edition of his glosses.

In the older historiography of the medieval learned law, the view developed that after the standard gloss had become fixed a generation of so-called commentators started to take over from the glossators. In fact, the early medieval legal scholars, too, wrote commentaries and lectures, but their main effort was indeed creating glosses.

Most of the older glosses are accessible only in medieval manuscripts: modern editions of only a few manuscripts exist. The main microfilm collections of glossed legal manuscripts are at the Max Planck Institute for European Legal History in Frankfurt am Main, at the universities of Munich, Würzburg, Milan, Leyden and Berkeley.

== People ==
- Irnerius
- Four Doctors of Bologna
  - Bulgarus
  - Martinus Gosia
  - Jacobus de Boragine
  - Hugo de Porta Ravennate
- Placentinus
- Azo of Bologna
- Accursius
- Franciscus Accursius
- Joannes Bassianus
- Tancred of Bologna
- Bernard of Botone

== See also ==
- Decretalist
- Decretist
- Postglossator
