= Jacobus de Boragine =

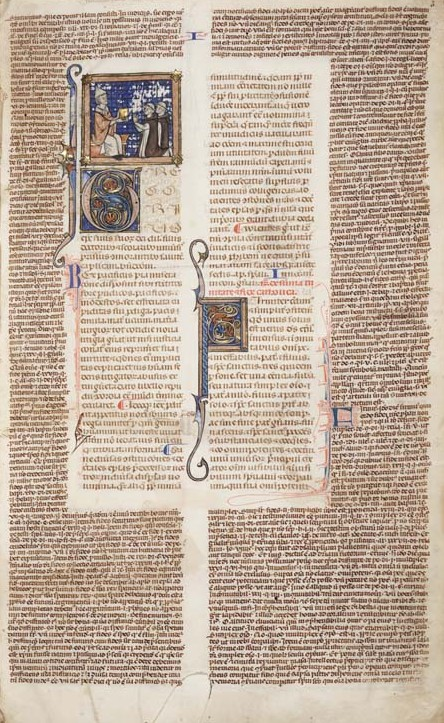
Decretals gloss by the Four Doctors of Bologna.

Jacobus de Boragine was one of the Glossators, and Four Doctors of Bologna. Jacobus was born in the early 12th century and was an Italian lawyer, one of four students of Irnerius called the Quattuor Doctores, although Savigny disputes the general tradition of his inclusion in this list. The other doctors were Bulgarus, Martinus and Hugo. The legal philosophy of Bulgarus adhered closely to the letter of the law while their fellow, Martinus, took a more natural law and Equity approach. His time at Bologna was therefore one of the formative times in legal theory.

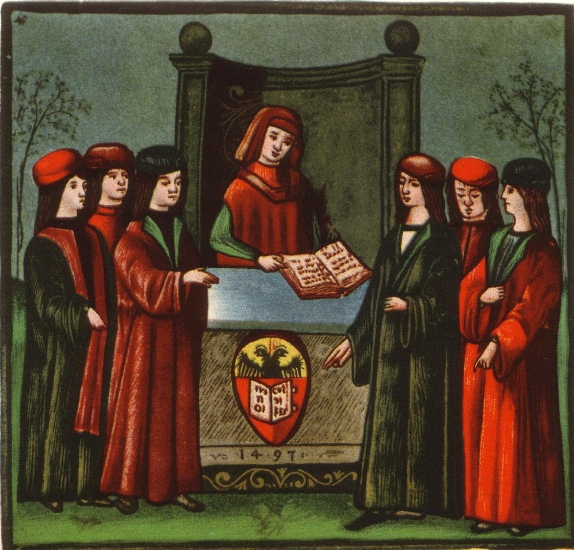
Students of the German nation at Bologna university.

He was an author of many parts of the Gloss of the Corpus juris civilis.

- The legal commentary De Regulis Juris, which Savigny called "a striking example of the brilliant results which had been obtained in a short space of time by a constant and exclusive study of the sources of law".

He died in 1178.
