= Universal power =

Either Pope or the Emperor vying for supremacy of the world

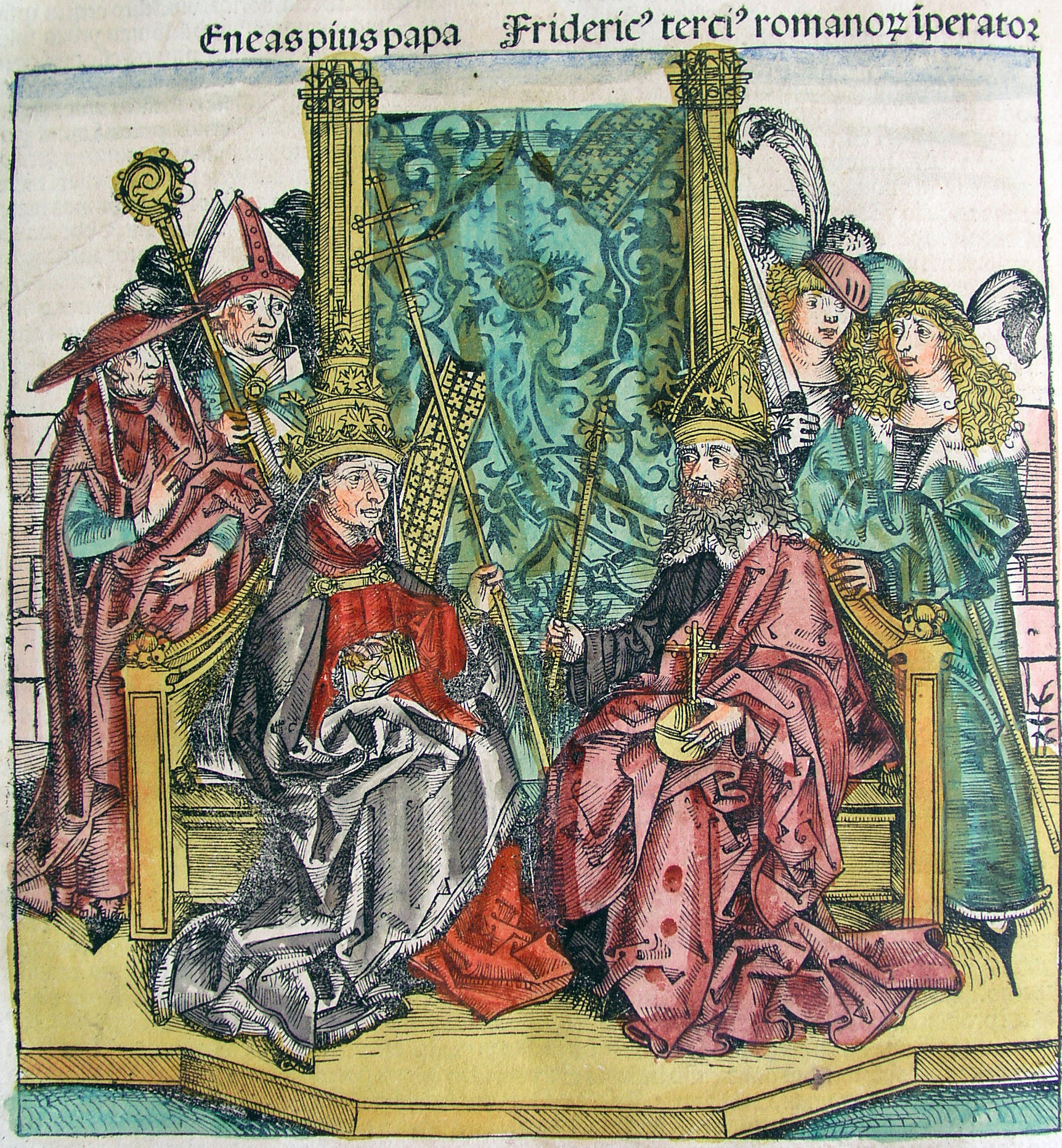
The pope Pius II and the emperor Frederick III.

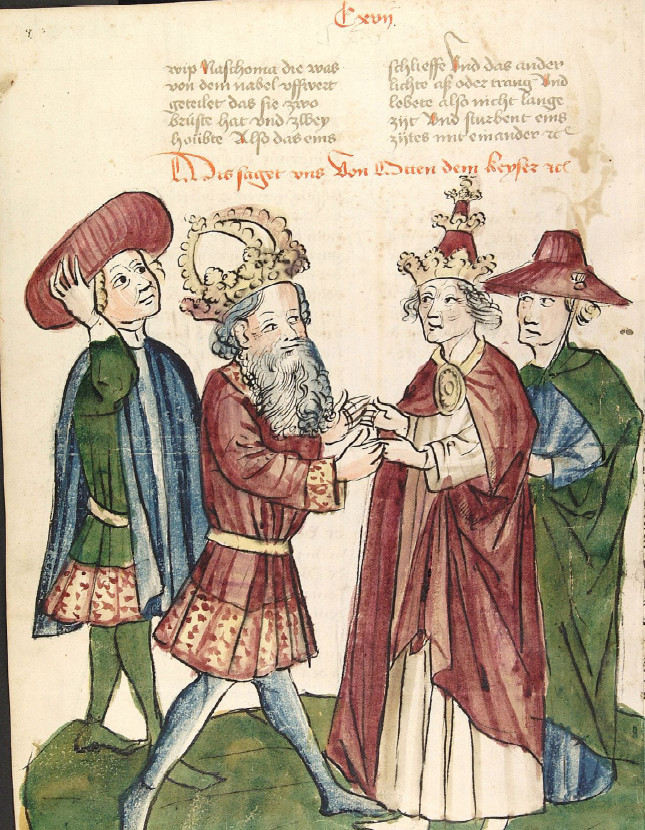
Pope John XII and emperor Otto I.

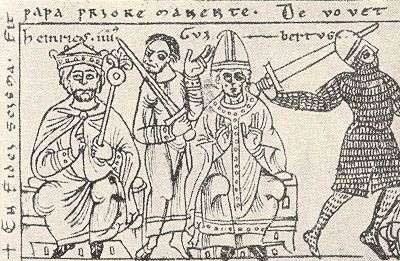
Antipope Clement III and emperor Henry IV.

In the Middle Ages, the term universal power referred to the Holy Roman Emperor and the Pope. Both were struggling for the so-called dominium mundi, or world dominion, in terms of political and spiritual supremacy.

The universal powers continued into the early 19th century until the Napoleonic Wars. The reshaping of Europe meant the effective end of the Empire. Although the Papacy had its territorial limits confined to the Vatican, it retained its soft power in the contemporary world.

== Origins ==
Given the Caesaropapism of the Byzantine Empire, the situation in the Western World after the decline of the Roman Empire assumed an exceptionally powerful position of the Bishop of Rome. As the only patriarch in the Western World, his status was soon converted into that of a primate (bishop). In addition to this spiritual power, the Bishop of Rome sought to gain temporal power over a territory held by various Germanic Kingdoms in order to make it a true theocracy. The Bishop of Rome tried to extend his territory from the city of Rome to the whole of Italy and further to the whole of the Western Roman Empire (in accordance with the Donation of Constantine). The coronation of Charlemagne in the year 800, which began the Carolingian Empire, marked the appearance of a secular authority with universal claims. The two century long coexistence of the Pontiff and the Empire (regnum et sacerdocium) was difficult and yielded the Investiture Controversy and several different ideological formulations (the theory of the two swords, Plenitutdo postestatis, Dictatus papae, condemnations of simony, and nicolaism). In these, the Pope tried to establish the supremacy of religious authority over civil authority. Meanwhile, the Emperor tried to enforce the legitimacy of his position, which claimed to come from the old Roman Empire (Translatio imperii). In order to do this, he established his military capability to impose his territorial power and extend his power over religious life. This was done in a manner similar to that of his equivalent in the East. Both efforts fell far short of their goals.

== Evolution ==
The division of the Carolingian Empire between the heirs of Louis the Pious and the claims of different dynasties, such as the Ottonian and the House of Hohenstaufen, to the imperial title, debilitated the power of the emperors and subjected them to a system of election. The system of election made them dependent on a delicate game of alliances between the nobles that held the title of Prince-Elector, some laymen and others clergymen. Notwithstanding, he would periodically try to regain imperial power (Otto III, Henry II). At times, this led to spectacular confrontations (Henry IV, Frederick I Barbarossa, Frederick II). The strengthening of the power of the papacy was very important from Pope Gregory I on, and depended on the support of the monastic orders, above all the Order of Cluny. The constitution of many of these new kingdoms made them feudally obligated to the Pope, which liberated them from the theoretical feudal subjugation of the emperor or another king (such was the case of Portugal). In the territory of the Sacred Empire, the rivalry between the Guelphs, supporting the Papacy, and Ghibellines, supporting the Emperor, dominated German and Italian political life from the 12th to the 15th century.

Eventually, the authority of the Emperor was converted into something purely theoretical, lacking a strong economic or military base. He was incapable of not only standing up to the feudal monarchies definitively free of all subordination Rex superiorem non recognoscens in regno suo est Imperator (Decretal Per Venerabilem by Innocent III, 1202), but to his own territorial princes or Italian city-states. The papal authority also decayed. The Crusades, advocated by the pope, did not give him more control of the briefly conquered territories in the Holy Land, the European kingdoms, or of the new religious orders. With the Avignon Papacy and the Western Schism, the French Monarchy subjugated the Papacy to its control. This further weakened the Pope's power and undermined the intimidating power of excommunication, which had been greatly feared.

The production of theoretical arguments on the theme of universal power, on the other hand, continued and included contributions such as those of Marsilius of Padua, Defensor Pacis or William of Ockham, Eight Questions about the Authority of the Pope (1342) and De imperatorum et pontificum potestate (1347). Such works continued to undermine the universal ambitions of both authorities and were produced by the most important authors of the scholasticism crisis. The scholasticism crisis debated the adoption and extension of new legal ideas taken from Roman Law, with the jus commune of the School of Bologna on one side and conciliarism of the Council of Florence on the other.

== End ==
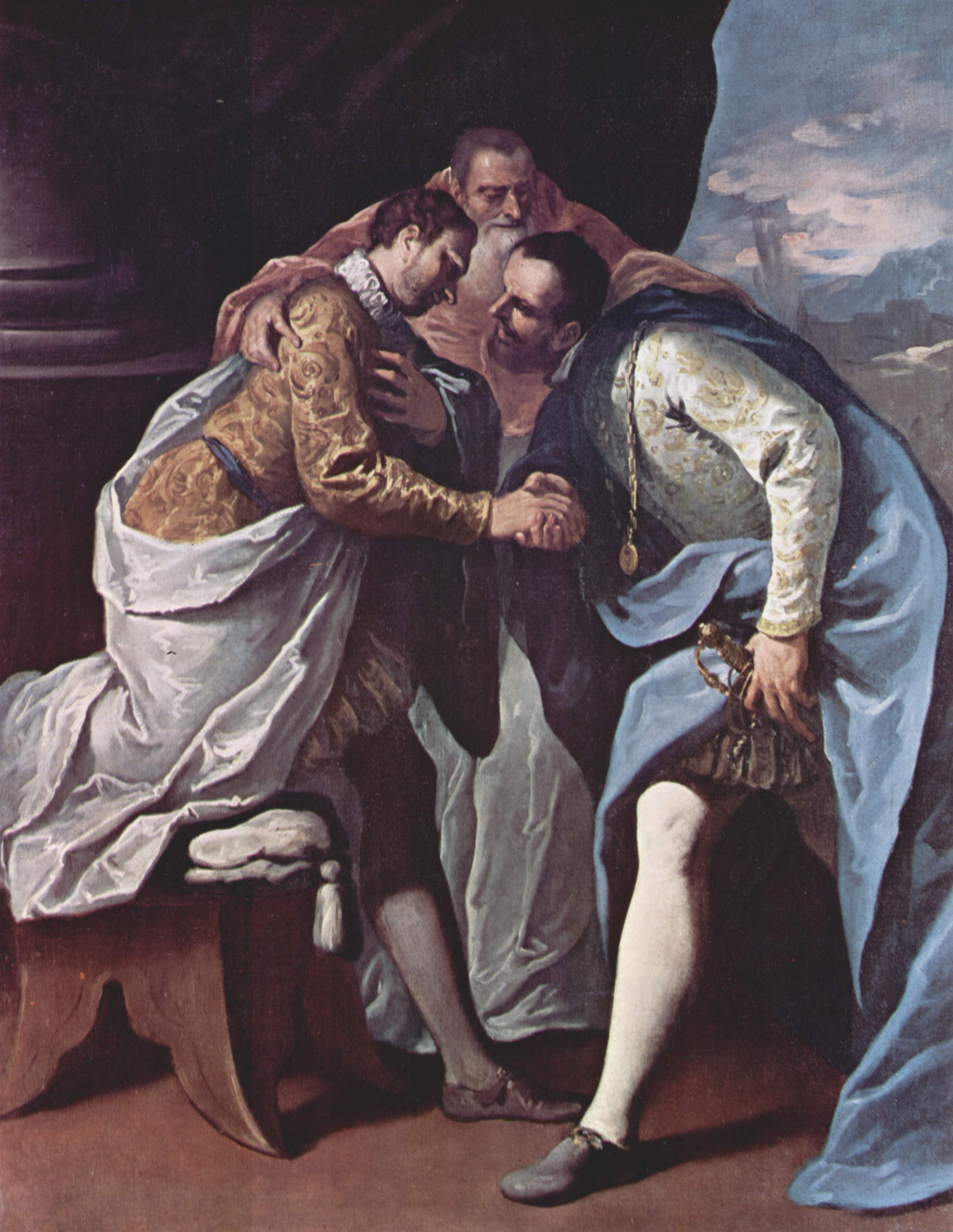
The emperor Charles V was reconciled with the king Francis I of France both encouraged by pope Paul III, oil by Sebastiano Ricci.

Both universal powers entered the Modern Age very debilitated, although their power continued to be notable. They tried to recoup what was lost. These attempts, however, proved unsuccessful, as in the cases of the emperor Charles V and the pontiffs of the Renaissance (Julius II and Leo X) and the Counter-Reformation, whose ambitions proved impossible in the long term. The reality that was imposed during the Ancien Régime was that of new authoritarian monarchies (such as the Catholic Monarchy) that evolved towards absolutism (as in France) or towards the bourgeois revolutions (as in the Netherlands with the Dutch Revolt and in England with the English Civil War). In 1648, the Treaty of Westphalia definitively supplanted the role of the universal powers and brought about modern, secularized international relations based on pragmatism and the prominence of states. Even within Catholic countries, the theory that only monarchs could grant royalties effectively limited the pontifical power.

The 19th century was the end of both universal powers as territorial entities: the Sacro Imperio was formally abolished by Napoleon Bonaparte, who created his own empire, and although Napoleon's empire was defeated, the Holy Roman Empire was not restored in the redrawing of the European map following the Congress of Vienna (1814–1815). The territories recuperated by the Habsburg dynasty were transformed into a multinational state, first as the Austrian Empire and later as a dual monarchy, the Austro-Hungarian Empire, which lasted until 1918. Additionally, the leadership of Prussia in the recently created German Confederation brought about the constitution of the Second German Empire in 1871.

Simultaneously, the relations of the Pope with the French Revolution and Napoleon, as with ideological liberalism itself, oscillated between direct opposition and forced coexistence. In 1860, the new Kingdom of Italy, formed by the Kingdom of Piedmont-Sardinia, conquered the Papal States' territorial base (called Marche) in the center of Italy. The Kingdom of Italy did not take Rome itself, however, until 1871 when the Second French Empire of Napoleon III withdrew its garrison in Rome which had served to protect the Papal States. The Pope's rejection of the situation and the voluntary confinement of the popes in the Vatican continued until the Lateran Pacts of 1929 with the Italian fascist Benito Mussolini.

Since then, the efforts of the Pope in the international scene and in the internal business of Catholic countries have transcended the territorial dimensions of the Vatican City, demonstrating that the religious dimension is very decisive. It has also shown that what has come to be called soft power, though subtle, can be effective because of its moral, ideological, and cultural weight.

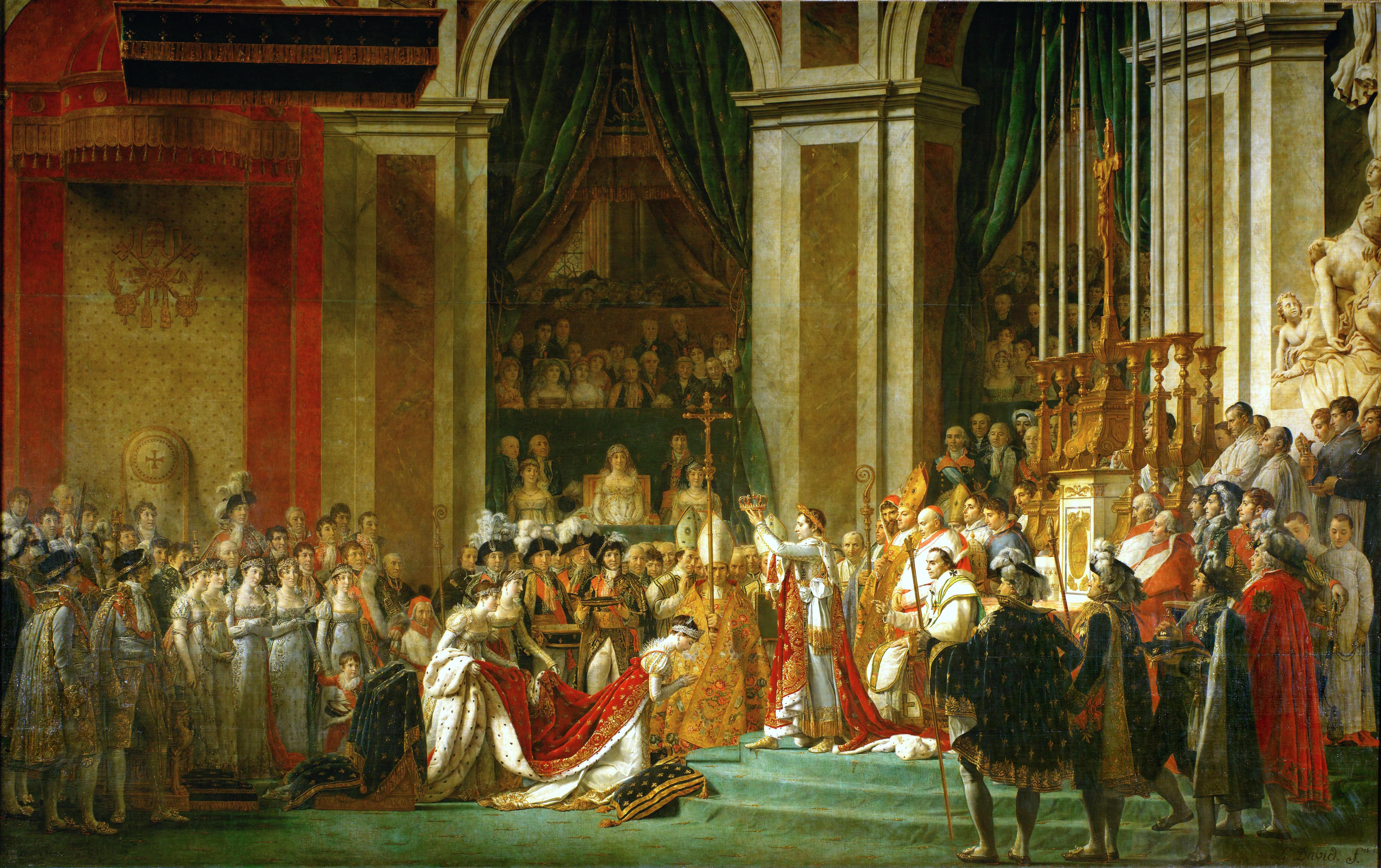
Coronation of Napoleon and Josefina before the Pope, reduced to an observer role, oil by Jacques-Louis David.

== Perseverance of the term ==
The name of "empire" has been applied to types of political entities that have not had a universal function (theocratic or Caesaropapist), but to those with a global, secularized one. This has been possible in geostrategic terms for the first time since the coming about of a global economy. Although the first empires to form (the Portuguese Empire and Spanish Empire in the 16th century) in their day did not refer to themselves as empires, (the Spanish self defined, in providentialist terms, as the Catholic Monarchy), the name typically has been applied by historiography (which applies "empire" to any political form of the past with multinational dimensions: Turk Empire, Mongol Empire, Inca Empire).

Consequently, this is done to the Russian Empire, which claimed to be a third Rome after the fall of Constantinople in 1453 (the title Czar is derived from Caesar).

The term is also applied to the overseas territorial possessions of the European states:

- the British Empire – justified by the Hindu Raj who made Queen Victoria empress of India
- the French Empire – that of the first Napoleon and that of the Third, although the name continued to be used for the colonies of the Third Republic
- the Italian Empire – that Mussolini sought in Africa

Analogously, the name "empire" is also used to refer to non-European entities, such as the Chinese Empire and the Japanese Empire, or give the title of emperor to those like the Negus of Ethiopia, the Shah of Persia, and the Sultan of Morocco. In most cases, this is a "diplomatic courtesy." Since the Cold War, it has also been common to refer to the two rival superpowers as the American Empire and the Soviet Empire.

== See also ==
- Cesaropapism
- Guelphs and Ghibellines
- Investiture Controversy
- Theocracy
- Dictatus papae
- Translatio imperii
