= Martinus Gosia =

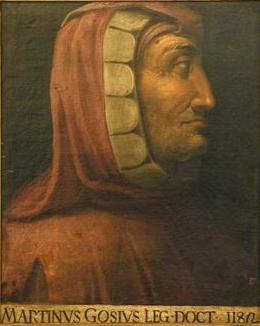
Martino Gosia

Martinus Gosia was one of the glossators and a 12th-century Italian jurist, counted among the Four Doctors of Bologna, the others being Bulgarus, Hugo de Porta Ravennate and Jacobus de Boragine.

Martinus Gosia and Bulgarus were the chiefs of two opposite schools at the University of Bologna, corresponding in many respects to the Proculians and Sabinians of the Roman Empire. Martinus was at the head of a school which accommodated the law to what his opponents styled the equity of the purse (aequitas bursalis), whilst Bulgarus adhered more closely to the letter of the law. The school of Bulgarus ultimately prevailed.

While the teaching of Bulgarus, became dominant in Bologna, among the nostri doctores, the followers of Martinus, taught in southern France where they became known as the commentators.

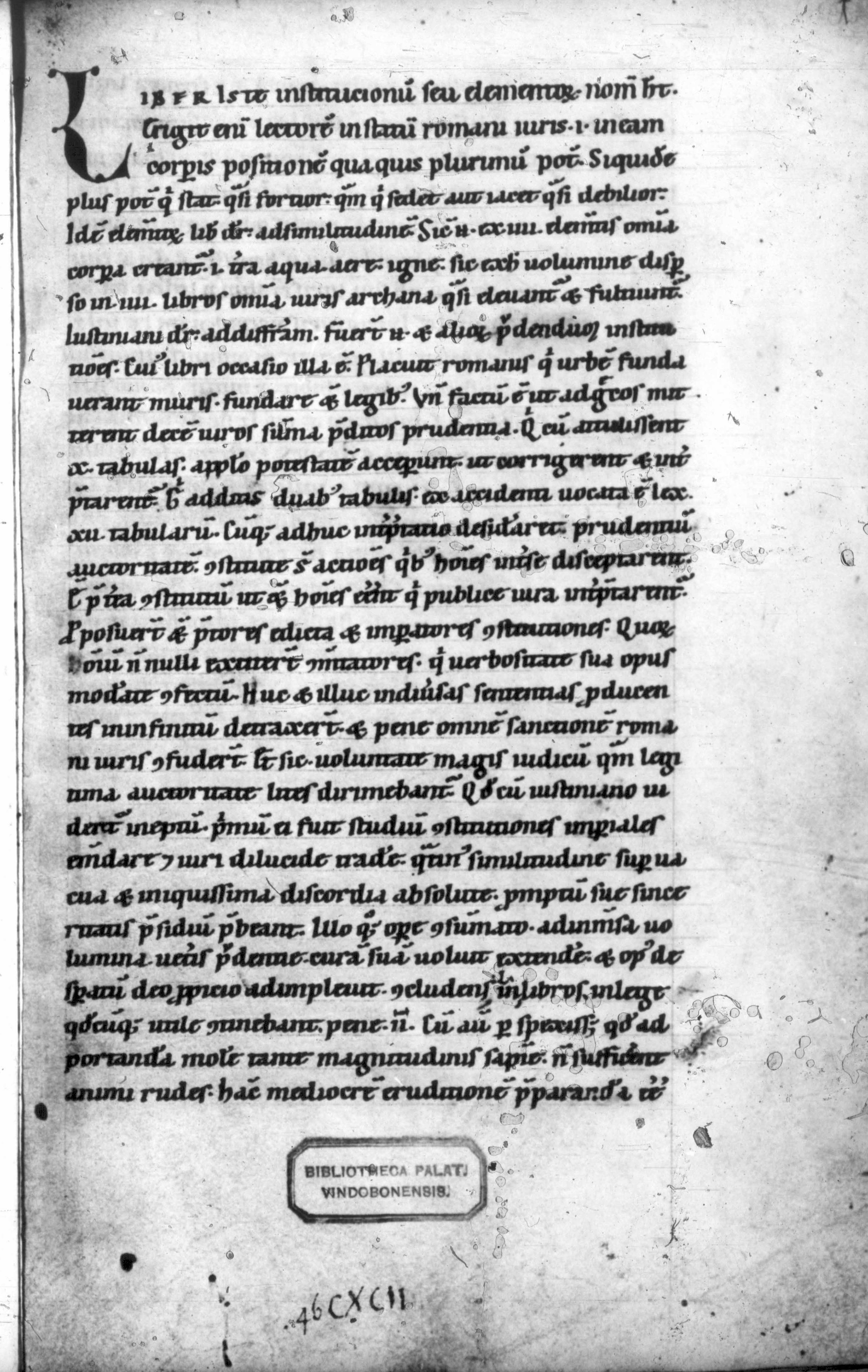
Distinctio de interesse, 12th-century manuscript. Wien, Österreichische Nationalbibliothek, Codices (Altbestand), Cod. 2176 (antea Jus civ. 192), ff. 162r-163v.

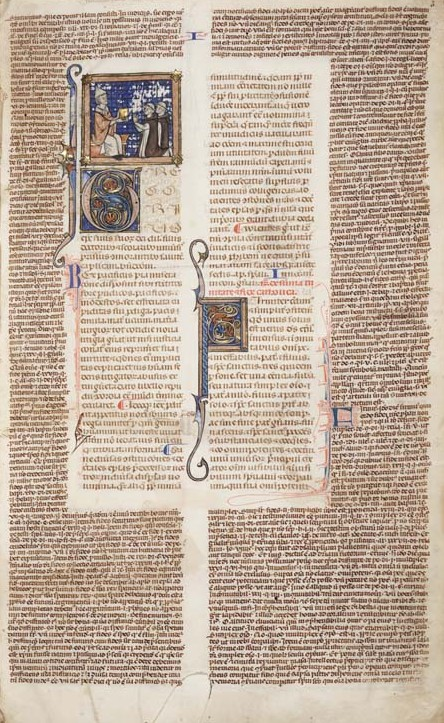
Decretals with Glossa ordinaria
