= Joannes Bassianus =

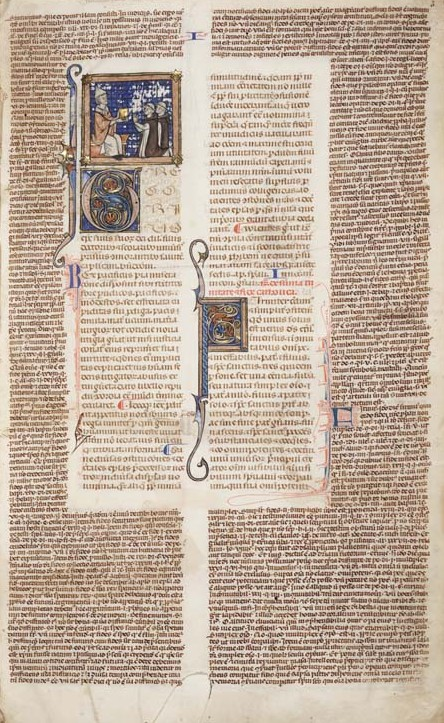
Decretals with Glossa ordinaria

Joannes Bassianus was an Italian jurist of the 12th century.

Little is known of his origin, but he is said by his jurist contemporary Carolus de Tocco to have been a native of Cremona. He was a professor in the law school of Bologna, the pupil of Bulgarus, and the master of Azo. The most important of his writings which have been preserved in his Summary on the Authentica, which Savigny regarded as one of the most precious works of the glossators.

Joannes, as he is generally termed, was remarkable for his talent in inventing ingenious forms for explaining his ideas with greater precision, and perhaps his most celebrated work is his "Law-Tree," which he entitled Arbor Actionum, and which has been the subject of numerous commentaries. The work presents a tree, upon the branches of which the various kinds of actions are arranged after the manner of fruit. The civil actions, or actiones stricti juris, being forty-eight in number, are arranged on one side, while the equitable or praetorian actions, in number one hundred and twenty-one, are arranged on the other side.

A further scientific division of actions was made by him under twelve heads, and by an ingenious system of notation the student was enabled to class at once each of the civil or praetorian actions, as the case might be, under its proper head in the scientific division. By the side of the tree a few glosses were added by Joannes to explain and justify his classification. His lectures on the Pandects and the Code, which were collected by his pupil Nicolaus Furiosus, have unfortunately perished.

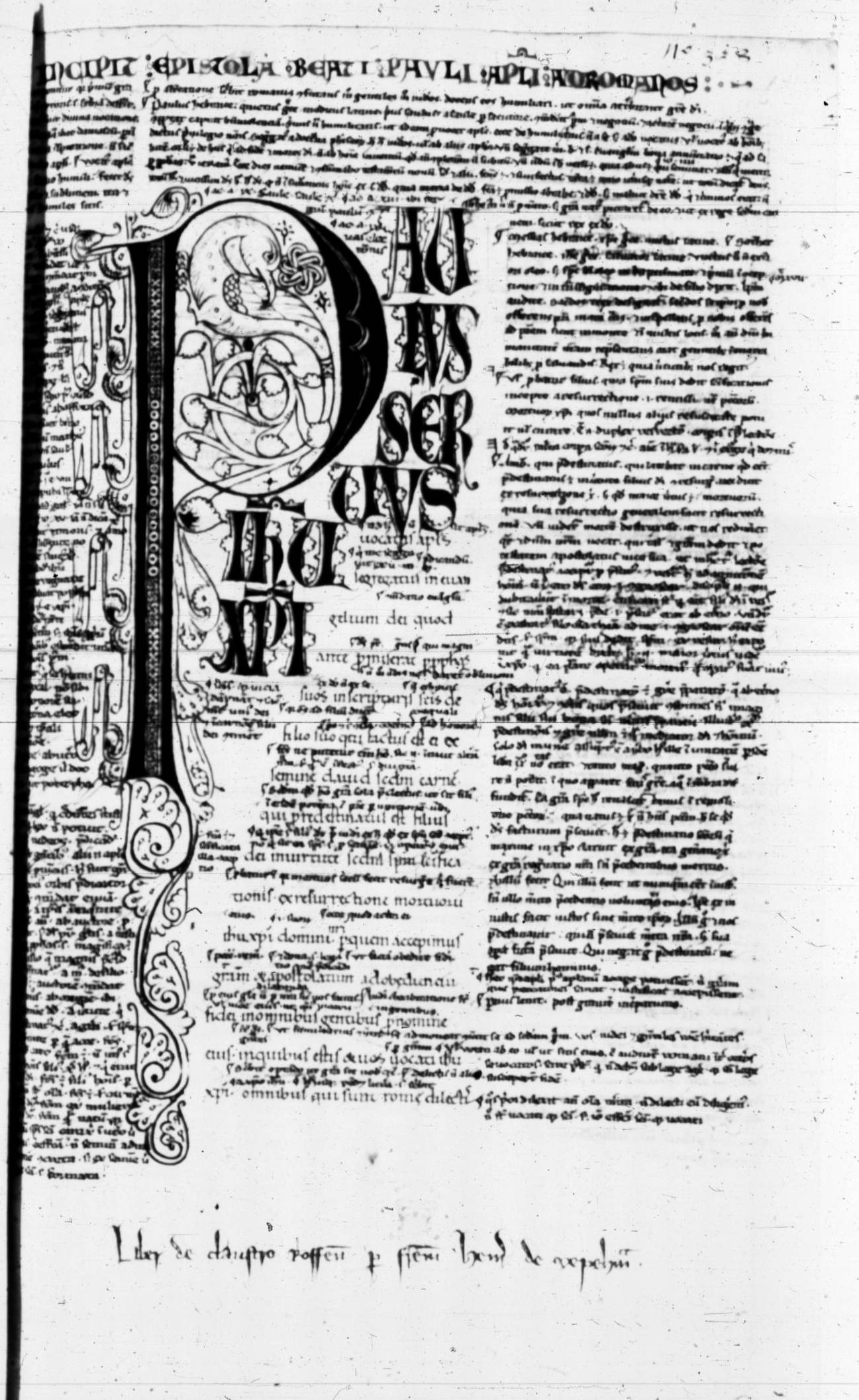
Lectura Institutionum, 13th-century manuscript. London, British Library, Royal MS, Royal 4.B.II.

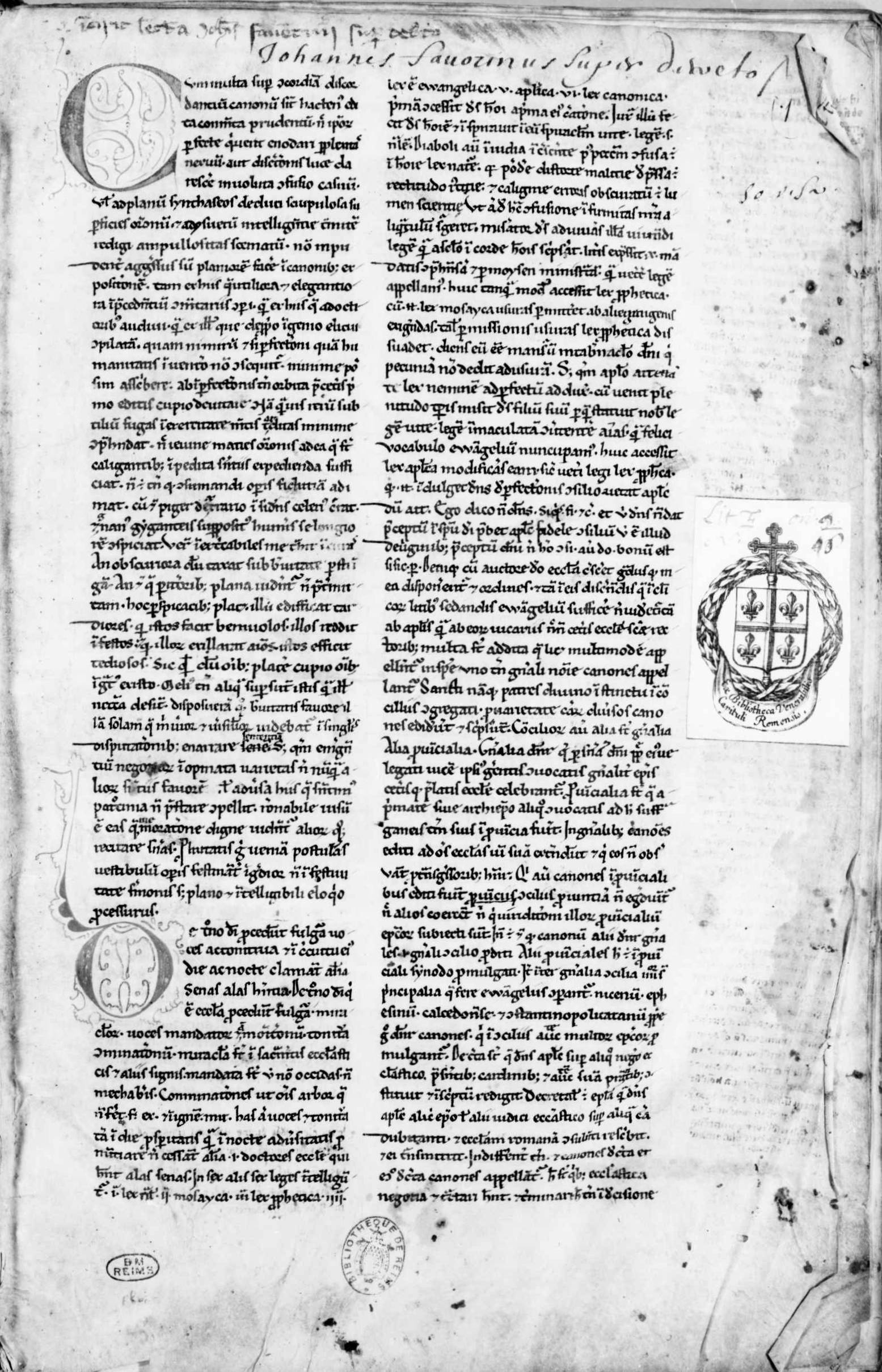
Summa cum glossis Bassiani, 13th-century manuscript. Reims, Bibliothèque municipale, Fonds manuscrits, Ms. 684.
