= Postglossator =

The postglossators or commentators formed a European legal school which arose in Italy and France in the fourteenth century. They form the highest point of development of medieval Roman law.

The school of the glossators in Bologna lost its vitality, resulting in the rise of a new school of legal thought in the 14th century, centred on Orléans in France. Bartolus and Baldus were the most famous of the commentators. Rather than simply seeking to explain the law, the commentators were more concerned with the potential for practical application of the law. Politically at this time, the idea of the Spirit of One – one church and one empire, was popular in Europe. Roman law thus appealed as bringing the potential for one law in addition. Roman law was written and certain as well as being generally consistent and complete. The educated liked its roots and saw the potential for application.

The commentators faced head on the conflict of law with custom as they saw the potential for practical application of the Roman law. They were opportunistic and as medieval Italy flourished, there were many opportunities to be the mediator between the developing political, scientific and economic spheres. Thus many of their ideas were based on practical morality, bold construction of the law and clever interpretations. For example, feudal law, which violated the absoluteness of dominium, was harmonised with Roman law by drawing links with the long lease, which gave rise to a vindicatio directa. The commentators argued that the vindicata directa was evidence of another type of ownership and that feudal ownership could fall within this category. This made Roman law more flexible, although was clearly a move away from the texts, and thus made it of greater practical use to rulers who were seeking a rational and coherent law.

The Commentators went beyond the glossators, who had treated each text separately. The commentators instead wrote prose commentaries on the texts (rather like lectures,) working through, book by book, through the Digest. Rather than simply taking individual Roman law texts at face value, making it useful for practical application involved considering the rationale and principles behind the law. Certain areas were thus not considered at all, for example, Bartolus makes no attempt to consider culpa. However, this general approach produced a far more sophisticated law and enabled harmonisation between Roman law and local law. For example, Roman law said that a will was valid if you had 5 witnesses and that Roman law superseded customary law, whilst Venice law only required 3 witnesses. Bartolus' approach was to consider why Roman law superseded custom. He concluded that this was because custom was presumed bad. However, in certain circumstances, custom would be allowed by the Emperor, where the law was considered good. Since the Venice law had come into practice after the Emperor, the Emperor had not considered if it were good law. However, it clearly was and therefore it should be allowed to continue. The Commentators also harmonised canon law with Roman law to some extent. Canonists argued that bare agreement could give rise to an action (but they only had jurisdiction where that agreement was made by oath.) The Commentators said that the canon law was simply a form of clothing which could make a bare pact enforceable.

The extraction of general principles allowed Roman law to be used in situations which were unfamiliar to the Romans, it provided a coherent and convenient set of rules, which could then be used to interpret local customs, which were given primacy but very narrowly interpreted. The impact of the commentators was thus substantial. Their commentaries were found throughout Europe, in fact it was said that if one was not a Bartolist (a commentator), one could not be a lawyer at all.
