= Placentinus =

Italian jurist (d. 1192)

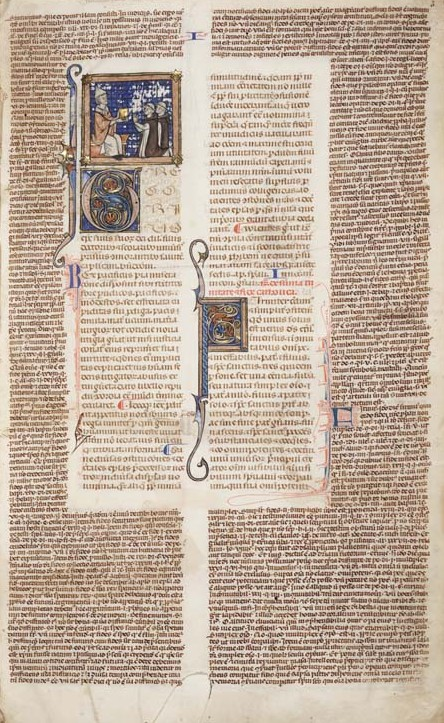
Decretals with Glossa ordinaria

Placentinus (died 1192) was an Italian jurist and glossator. Originally from Piacenza, he taught at the University of Bologna. From there he founded the law school of the University of Montpellier, in 1160.

== Bibliography ==
- Peter Goodrich (1995). Oedipus Lex: Psychoanalysis, History, Law. University of California Press. p. 244. ISBN 978-0-520-08990-7.
