= Medieval Roman law =

Continuation of ancient Roman law in the late Middle Ages

Medieval Roman law is the continuation and development of ancient Roman law that developed in the European Late Middle Ages. Based on the ancient text of Roman law, Corpus iuris civilis, it added many new concepts, and formed the basis of the later civil law systems that prevail in the vast majority of countries.

== Rediscovery of ancient Roman law ==
Although some legal systems in western Europe in the Early Middle Ages, such as the Visigothic Code, retained some features of ancient Roman law, the main texts of Roman law were little known, except in the Byzantine Empire, where its Roman legal system, based on Justinian's Code, prevailed and was occasionally updated. That changed when the Digest was rediscovered in late 11th century Italy. It was soon apparent that the Digest was a massive intellectual achievement and that the assimilation of its contents would require much time and study. The first western European university, the University of Bologna, was set up in large part with the aim of studying it.

== The era of the glossators ==
The ancient Roman law texts were not very explicit about matters of principle, and the commentators found it necessary to develop the scholastic method of comparing potentially conflicting texts and inferring principles that would explain the apparent contradictions. The commentators of the 12th and early 13th centuries, called glossators, such as Azo of Bologna and Accursius, produced large-scale harmonization of and commentary on the texts. They developed new concepts by reflecting on different related texts, such as the concept of half-proof in the law of evidence. Many of these glosses or interpretations, were compiled into one text around 1220 by Accursius. This text was known as the Glossa Ordinaria and was a compilation of the most important commentaries made by the glossators.

Initially the rediscovered Roman law was not the law of any particular country or institution, but as lawyers trained in the concepts of Roman law came to dominate the legal profession, Roman law came to have an immense effect on law as actually practiced. For example, torture was reintroduced into Europe as a means of acquiring evidence, usually when there was half-proof or more against a defendant but not yet sufficient proof for conviction.

English law incorporated a substantial amount of Roman concepts through the works of Glanvill and Bracton. But it adopted the non-Roman jury system as the main form of evidence evaluation, thus remaining less influenced by Roman law than continental systems. However, some English courts, such as the Court of Admiralty, operated on Roman law principles.

Canon law, the law of the Roman Catholic Church which governed such matters as marriage, developed in parallel with medieval Roman law and incorporated many of its concepts.

== The era of the postglossators ==
The postglossators of the 14th century, such as Bartolus de Saxoferato and Baldus de Ubaldis, developed a more mature and deeper legal theory, less closely tied to the ancient texts. That gave the law sufficient flexibility to incorporate new concepts. For example, the first printed book on insurance was the Roman law treatise On Insurance and Merchants' Bets by Pedro de Santarém (Santerna), written in 1488 and published in 1552.

== Later influence ==
Roman law often acted (except in England) as a "common law" (ius commune) that filled the gap where local laws were silent, as well as supplying principles of interpretation for those laws in doubtful cases. In this way, Scots law was heavily influenced by Roman law from the 15th century.

Roman law was in part incorporated in later codifications of continental law such as the Napoleonic Code and hence formed a core of their successors, the civil law systems of modern European and other countries.

Roman law also had wide influence on Western political theory. Questions such as the scope and limits of government and the permissibility of tyrannicide were seen in legal terms and discussed by writers whose primary training was in law. These ideas formed the basis of modern constitutionalism, generally "constitutional law" and many elements of its specific rhetoric.

According to Charles Donahue the difference between procedural and substantive law entered the modern law from medieval Roman law.

== Bibliography ==
- Atzeri, Lorena Roman Law and Reception, EGO - European History Online, Mainz: Institute of European History, 2017, retrieved: March 8, 2021 (pdf).
- Manlio Bellomo. The Common Legal Past of Europe, 1000-1800. Washington, DC: The Catholic University of America Press, 1995.
- Berman, Harold J. (1983). Law and Revolution: The Formation of the Western Legal Tradition. Cambridge, Mass: Harvard University Press. ISBN 0-674-51774-1.
- Cairns, John W; Paul J du Plessis (2010). The Creation of the Ius Commune: From Casus to Regula. Edinburgh: Edinburgh University Press. ISBN 978-0-7486-3897-0. Archived from the original on 2012-12-21.
- Canning, Joseph (1987). The Political Thought of Baldus de Ubaldis. Cambridge: Cambridge University Press. ISBN 0-521-32521-8.
- Orazio Condorelli & Rafael Domingo, eds. Law and the Christian tradition in Italy: the legacy of the great jurists. Abingdon: Routledge, 2021.
- Franklin, James (2001). The Science of Conjecture: Evidence and Probability Before Pascal. Baltimore, MD: Johns Hopkins University Press. ISBN 0-8018-6569-7. Archived from the original on 2008-02-07.
- Tamar Herzog. A Short History of European Law: The Last Two and a Half Millennia. Cambridge, Mass.: Harvard University Press, 2018.
- Randall Lesaffer. European Legal History: A Cultural and Political Perspective. Trans. Jan Arriens. Cambridge: Cambridge University Press, 2009.
- Enrico Pattaro, ed. A Treatise of Legal Philosophy and General Jurisprudence. 12 vols. Dordrecht–London–NY: Springer, 2006–16.
  - Andrea Padovani & Peter Stein, eds. A Treatise of Legal Philosophy and General Jurisprudence, vol. 7: The Jurists’ Philosophy of Law from Rome to the Seventeenth Century. Dordrecht–London–NY: Springer, 2016.
  - Damiano Canala, Paolo Grossi, & Hasso Hofmann, eds. A Treatise of Legal Philosophy and General Jurisprudence, vol. 9: A History of the Philosophy of Law in the Civil Law World, 1600-1900. Dordrecht–London–NY: Springer, 2009.
- Pennington, Kenneth (1993). The Prince and the Law, 1200-1600: Sovereignty and rights in the Western legal tradition. Berkeley: University of California Press. ISBN 0-520-07995-7.
- Heikki Pihlajamaki et al., eds. The Oxford Handbook of European Legal History. Oxford: Oxford University Press, 2018.
- O.F. Robinson et al. European Legal History: Sources and Institutions, 3rd edn. Oxford: Oxford University Press, 2005.
- Stein, Peter (1999). Roman Law in European History. Cambridge: Cambridge University Press. ISBN 0-521-64372-4.
- Bart Wauters & Marco De Benito. The History of Law in Europe: An Introduction. Edward Elgar, 2017.
