= Diet of Roncaglia =

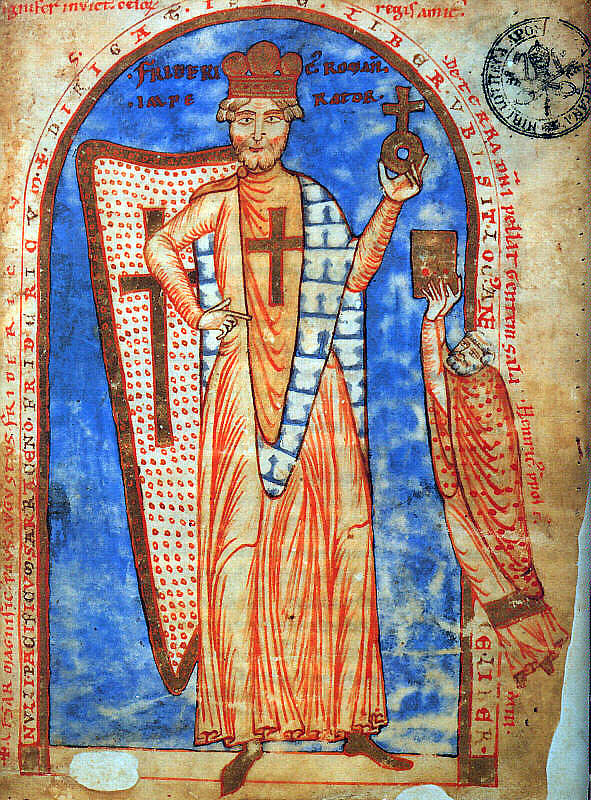
Frederick I, Holy Roman Emperor, who held the Diet of Roncaglia.

The Diet of Roncaglia, held near Piacenza, was an Imperial Diet, a general assembly of the nobles and ecclesiasts of the Holy Roman Empire and representatives of Northern Italian cities held in 1154 and in 1158 by Emperor Frederick Barbarossa to deliberate on the matter of sovereignty of his subjects, which was being challenged by the economical and political flourishing of the northern Italian cities and free comunes, including the cities of Chieri, Asti, Tortona, but most importantly Milan.

It followed a series of raids carried out by the forces of Frederick Barbarossa in Italy, which forced the submission of the leading city of Milan. The Emperor wished to establish his rights as feudal sovereign in the face of the growing independence of trading cities, which had won charters of municipal privilege during the earlier periods of strife between Papacy and Empire.

The determination of the respective rights of the parties was left to four jurists from Bologna, the home of the great law school founded in 1088. The lawyers' decision favored the emperor, judging that his rule was by divine right, thus restoring the Imperial rights established since the period of nascent trade under rule of Emperor Otto. The lawyers proceed to define taxes, tolls, and exactions of various kinds to be imposed on trade.

The Lombard cities would not accept the verdict, and it had to be enforced by war. Imperial forces dominated prior to the true unification of the Lombard League, and the city of Milan was razed to the ground in 1162. But the cities came to understand the value of a proper alliance post Destructionem Mediolani ("after the destruction of Milan").

The decisive battle in the continuing struggle was the Battle of Legnano in 1176, where Frederick was defeated by the Lombard League, and later forced to renege his rights of sovereignty south of the Alps, in the Kingdom of Italy.
