= Hugo de Porta Ravennate =

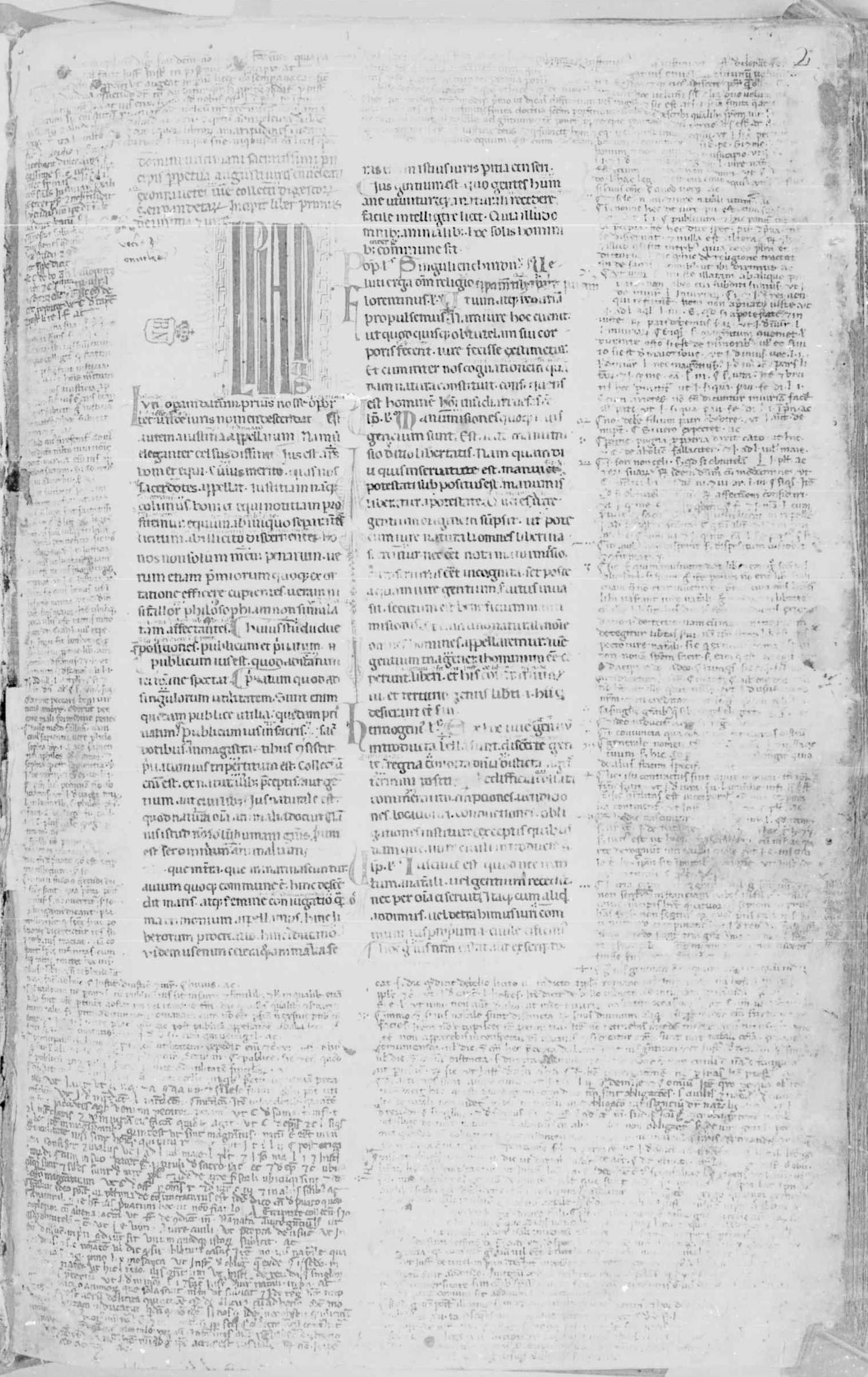
Glossae ad Digestum vetus, 14th-century manuscript

Hugo de Porta Ravennate was an Italian jurist, and member of the Glossators of Bologna. He came from a noble family who had residence in the city of Bologna, but whose family name meant "the gate of Ravenna".

Study and teaching at the University of Bologna, Hugo was one of the "four doctors", a group of disciples of Irnerius who were formative in the development of European law. Their authority was such that the four lawyers were called by Frederick Barbarossa as directors imperial in the diet of Roncaglia in 1158. This royal patronage allowed them to secure privileges for the newly developing institution of the university, at Bologna.

It is not known when he died but it was after 1166 AD, when a document is attested to him, but no later than 1171 AD, when a document mentions his widow.

He wrote the glosses to the recovered Roman law, the distinctiones and Summula de pugna. His students established a third and later a fourth generation of legal scholars at Bologna and also included many leaders of Europe including William of Tyre.
