= Irnerius =

Italian jurist

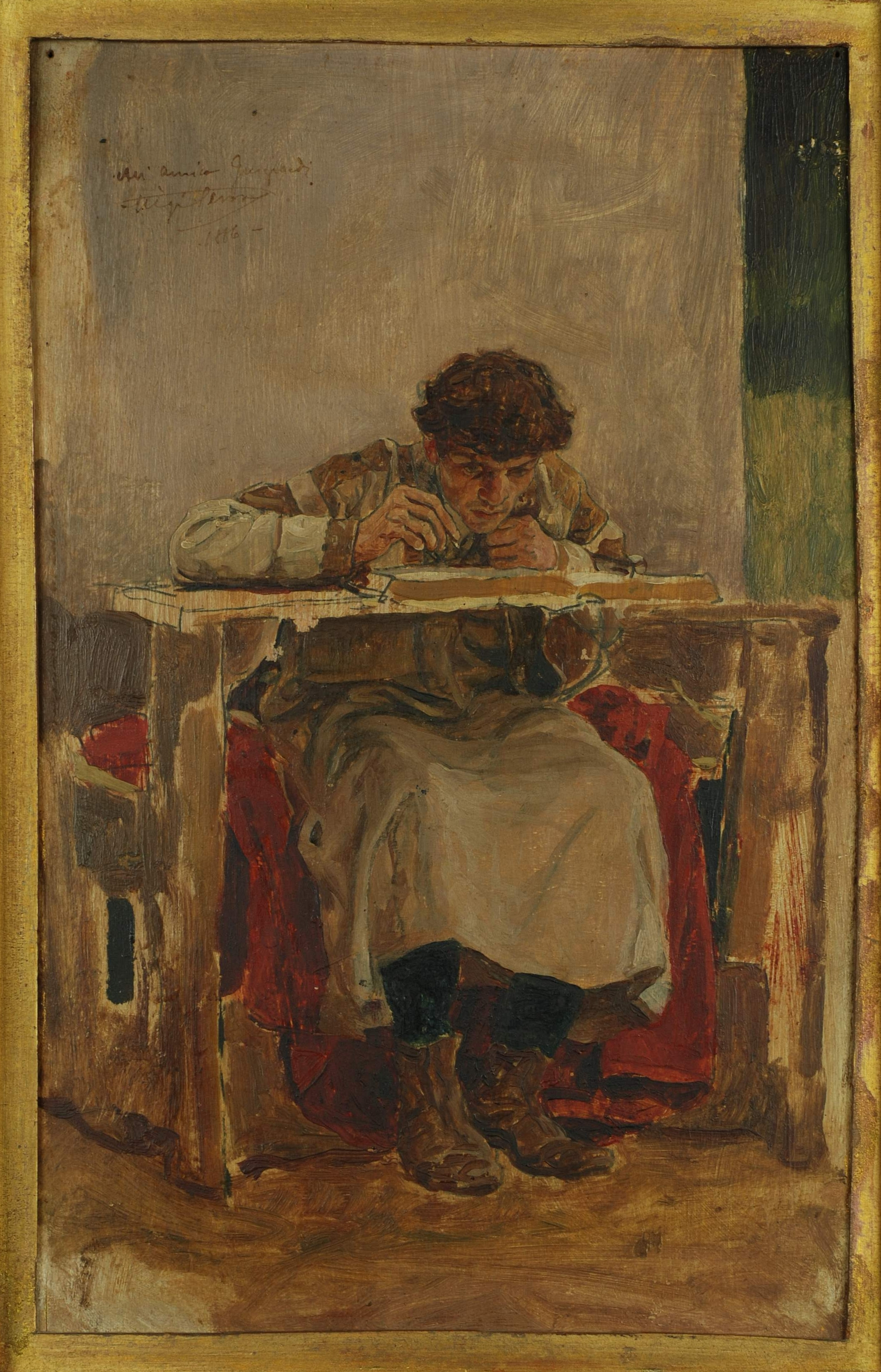
Irnerius elucidates the Justinian Code by Luigi Serra

Irnerius (c. 1050 – after 1125), sometimes referred to as lucerna juris ("lantern of the law"), was an Italian jurist, and founder of the School of Glossators and thus of the tradition of medieval Roman Law.

He taught the newly recovered Roman lawcode of Justinian I, the Corpus Juris Civilis, among the liberal arts at the University of Bologna, his native city. The recovery and revival of Roman law, taught first at Bologna in the 1070s, was a momentous event in European cultural history. Irnerius' interlinear glosses on the Corpus Juris Civilis stand at the beginnings of a European law that was written, systematic, comprehensive and rational, and based on Roman law.

== Life ==
He was born in Bologna about 1050.

At the urging of Countess Matilda of Tuscany, he began to devote himself to the study of jurisprudence, taking the Justinian code as a guide. After teaching jurisprudence for a short while in Rome, he returned to Bologna, where he founded a new school of jurisprudence in 1084 or 1088, which would rival the law school of Ravenna.

Some jurisprudence had been taught at Bologna, before Irnerius founded his school, by Pepo and a few others, and a tradition of jurisprudence had developed at Pavia since the mid-ninth century. He introduced the custom of explaining the Roman law by means of glosses, which originally were meagre interlinear elucidations of the text. But since the glosses were often too extensive to be inserted between the lines of the text, he began to write them on the margin of the page, thus being the first to introduce the marginal glosses which afterwards came into general use.

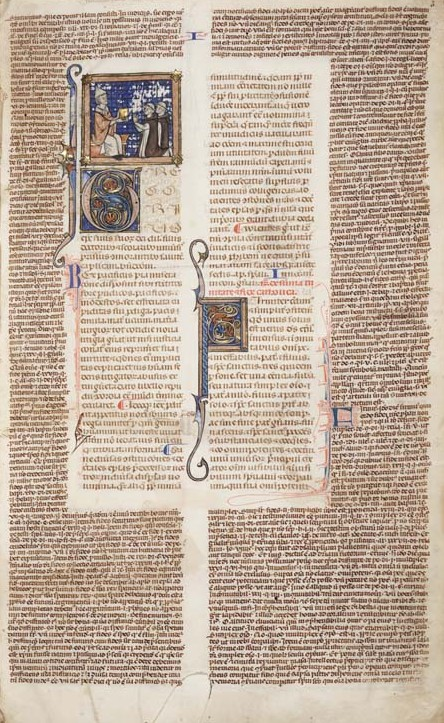
Decretals with Glossa ordinaria

After the death of Pope Paschal II, he defended the rights of Emperor Henry V in the papal election and upheld the legality of the election of the imperial antipope Gregory VIII. After 1116, he appears to have held some office under the emperor.

He died, perhaps during the reign of the emperor Lothair II, but certainly before 1140.

== Teaching ==
Irnerius taught along lines firmly established in the teaching of Scripture, by reading aloud a section of the civil law, which the students would copy, and add to the text his commentary and explanatory glosses. Thus he was the first of the glossators, whose explications of the law became an essential part of the legal curriculum.

The text of Justinian's Pandects used in Bologna, referred to as the Littera Bononiensis, closely parallel to the Littera Florentina, would be disseminated throughout Europe as students returned home from Bologna: there are versions of the Bolognese Littera with provenances in Paris, Padua, Leipzig and at the Vatican (Purpura 2001).

== Works ==
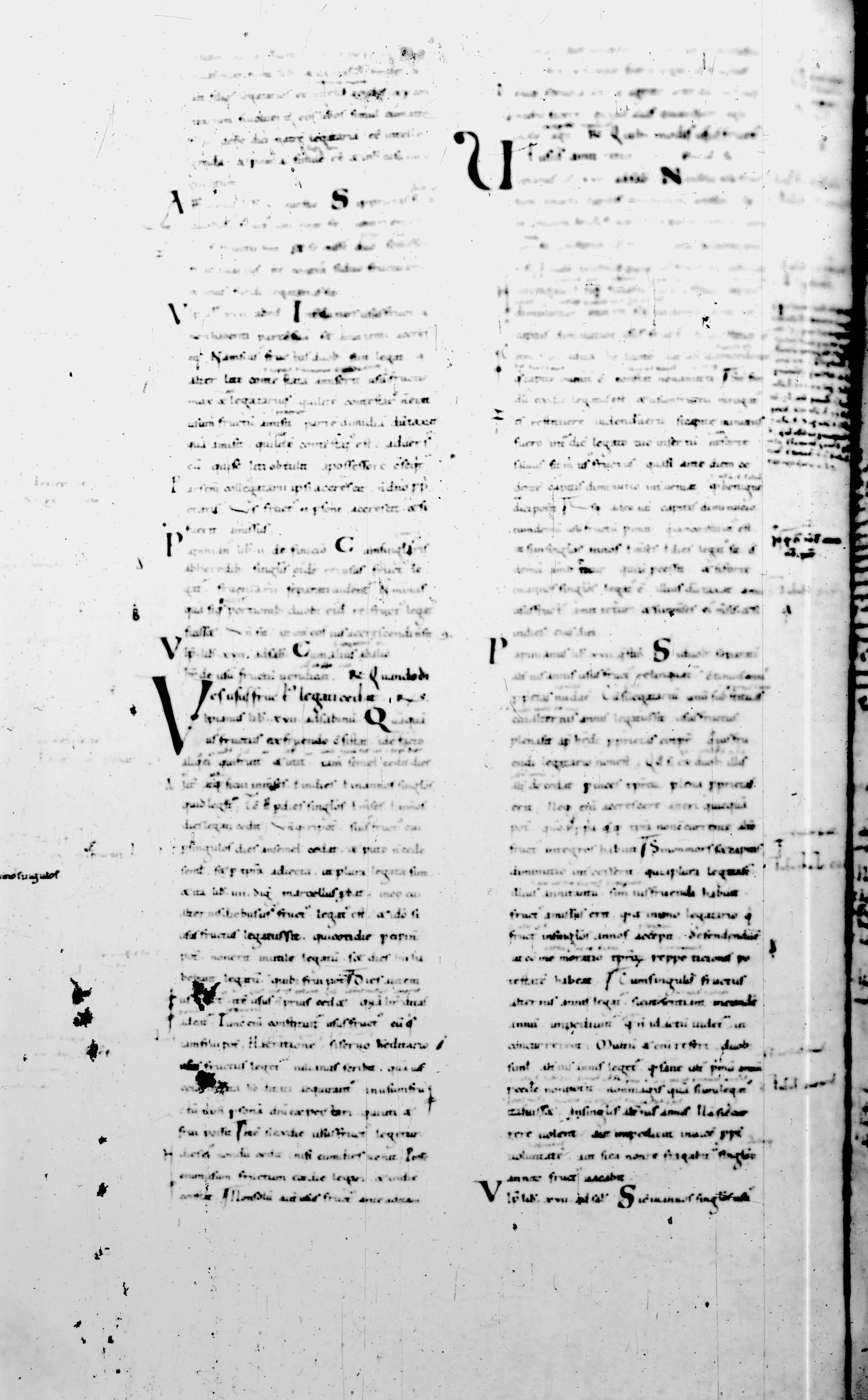
Glossae ad Digestum vetus, 12th-century manuscript. Padua, Biblioteca Universitaria di Padova, Fondo manoscritti, ms. 941, ff. 1-198.

According to ancient opinion (which, however, has been much controverted), Irnerius was the author of the epitome of the Novellae of Justinian, called the Authentica, arranged according to the titles of the Code. His Formularium tabellionum (a directory for notaries) and Quaestiones (a book of judicial decisions) are no longer extant.

The Summa Codicis, attributed to Irnerius by Herman Fitting in his 1894 edition is now widely considered a later work of between 1130 and 1159, but remains the earliest known summa on Justinian's Code

Another important work, Quaestiones de juris subtilitatibus, was generally ascribed to Irnerius until Hermann Kantorowicz published a manuscript from the British Museum.

Other juridical works and glosses that are ascribed to Irnerius are extant only in fragments, or their authorship is uncertain.

== Reputation ==
Irnerius was largely forgotten until his name was revived by German historians of the later 19th century and came to prominence with the celebrations marking the octocentennial of the University of Bologna.

Anders Winroth has questioned much of the received account of Irnerius' life as well as his importance to the history of Roman law in the Middle Ages.

== Sources ==
- Nouveau Larousse illustré (in French) undated, early 20th century
