= Medieval law =

Law of the European Middle Ages

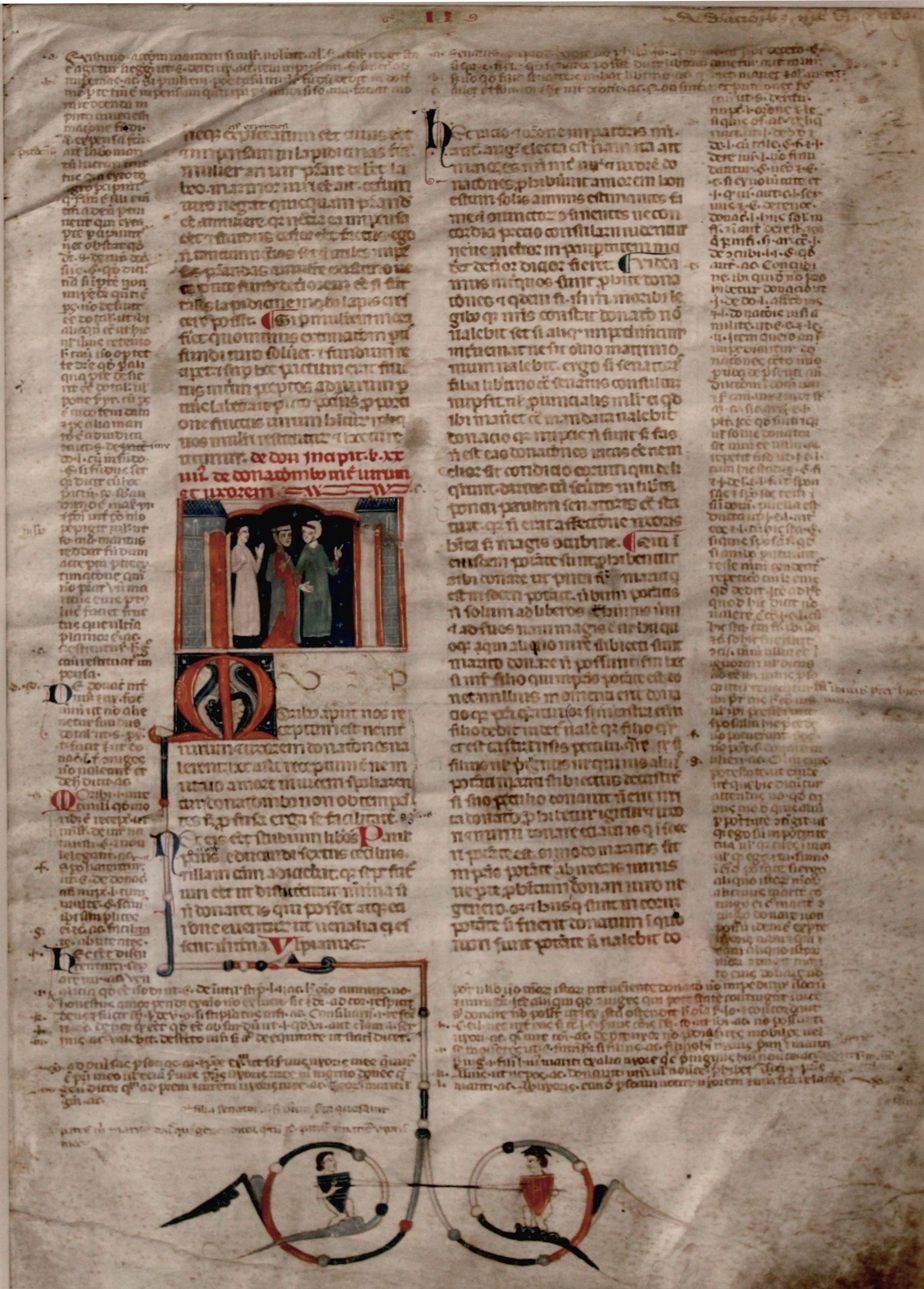
Incipit of Book XXIV of the Digest of the Corpus iuris civilis of Justinian I, devoted to gifts between spouses, with the related glosses. Manuscript illuminated manuscript by an anonymous author, probably from the Lombard area, active at the end of the 13th century and preserved in the Casa Museo di Palazzo Maffei in Verona.

Medieval law was the law in force in Europe from the final phases of Roman law, coinciding with the disintegration of the Western Roman Empire in the 5th century, until the beginning of the early modern period, around the 15th–16th century, a period that traditional historiography identifies as the Middle Ages. Legal historians have emphasized how this legal experience was distinguished by certain peculiar features, to the point that it has been defined as "a new legal mentality embodied in a harmonious complex of behaviors, rules, and reflections, with its own distinctly characteristic profile".

With the consolidation of the barbarian kingdoms, an order characterized by the personality of law emerged: the subjected Latin populations were allowed to retain the ancient Roman law, while relations within the community of the ruling barbarians were regulated by their own law. Although Germanic law was largely customary in nature and transmitted orally, some rulers nevertheless sought to record the legal tradition of their people in writing; however, such compilations neither had nor sought to have a universal character, dealing mainly with criminal and family law, and leaving ample room for ancient customs in matters not addressed. The absence of a central power intent on holding a monopoly over legal production was one of the aspects that most strongly influenced the entire history of medieval law. Among the most important compilations of law of the Early Middle Ages are the Lex Burgundionum, commissioned by Gundobad at the beginning of the 6th century, the Edictum of the king of the Goths Theodoric the Great, the Edict of Rothari promulgated by the Lombard king Rothari in 643, and the various capitularies issued by the Frankish rulers. Separate mention should be made of the monastic rules, one of the most characteristic forms of early medieval legal production.

After the year 1000, Europe experienced a period of cultural and economic revival. To respond to the new needs of an increasingly complex society, there was a rediscovery of Roman law, ancient yet technically sophisticated. The texts collected in the Corpus iuris civilis of Justinian were reconstructed and studied by the school of the glossators, initiated by Irnerius in Bologna around the beginning of the 12th century. From this point onward, a class of learned jurists trained in law schools increasingly came to prominence; these would give rise to the medieval universities and to the elaboration of a new legal system, common law, destined to spread throughout Europe. Among the most significant figures of the new system was the notary, from whose activities important legal institutions emerged, sometimes drawn from Roman law but at other times the result of autonomous elaborations, intended to regulate the many aspects of practical life: commerce, navigation, the organization of the free communes, and so forth. Particularly notable was the development of canon law, achieved through the compilation of sources and the production of glosses, including the famous Decretum Gratiani of the mid-12th century. The system of "common law", in Latin ius commune, came to coexist, and at times to clash, with the law produced by authorities, the ius proprium; however, it did so "leaving to the jurist the task of elaborating an underlying framework capable of giving unitary coherence to such multiplicity". Only with the early modern period and the affirmation of the nation-states would central authority acquire full control over the production and administration of law, bringing the experience of medieval law to an end and ushering in the modern one.

== Introduction: periodization and characteristics ==
The beginning of medieval law can be identified with the progressive decline, which began toward the end of the 4th century, of the Western Roman Empire and its refined and complex legal institutions, culminating, according to traditional historiography, with the deposition of the last Western emperor Romulus Augustulus by the barbarian Odoacer in 476. The subsequent roughly 1,000 years, commonly referred to as the Middle Ages, saw in Europe the succession of various forms of government, from the Roman–barbarian kingdoms to the Carolingian Empire, to feudalism, to medieval communes, to principalities and lordships, without forgetting the complex constitution of the Holy Roman Empire; all these systems, however, shared a lack of sovereignty, typical of the previous Roman experience and of later modern states, which was reflected in a relative disinterest in the production of law. It was thus that different legal systems gradually emerged, initially the result of customary consolidations and later through the work of learned jurists.

Traditionally, the Middle Ages are divided into the Early Middle Ages and the Late Middle Ages, whose temporal boundaries are not unambiguously defined: for Italy, the 11th century is usually assumed as the dividing line, while for regions of Northern Europe this period shifts forward by a couple of centuries. Despite these uncertainties, this article follows the Italian historiographical tradition while keeping in mind that it is primarily a "convenient" division and does not correspond to a substantial change in the medieval legal experience, which, according to many historians, such as Paolo Grossi, remains consistent in its most peculiar characteristics until the end of the Middle Ages. However, Grossi himself speaks of an «officina della prassi» (workshop of practice) regarding the early-medieval period, in relation to the frequent recourse to custom by the jurists of the time, and a «laboratorio sapienziale» (sapiential laboratory) for the late-medieval period, characterized by cities and trade, where a new class of jurists developed new solutions based on existing material.

Depending on the author, the Middle Ages end around the transition between the late 15th and the early 16th century: this period can also be associated with the decline of medieval law, stifled by the rise of the nation-states, increasingly inclined to assume responsibility for legal production, and by a religious reform that definitively changed Europe following profound anthropological reflection developed over more than two centuries within the Western Christian society of the time.

== Christian Roman Law between the 4th and 5th centuries: the first codifications ==
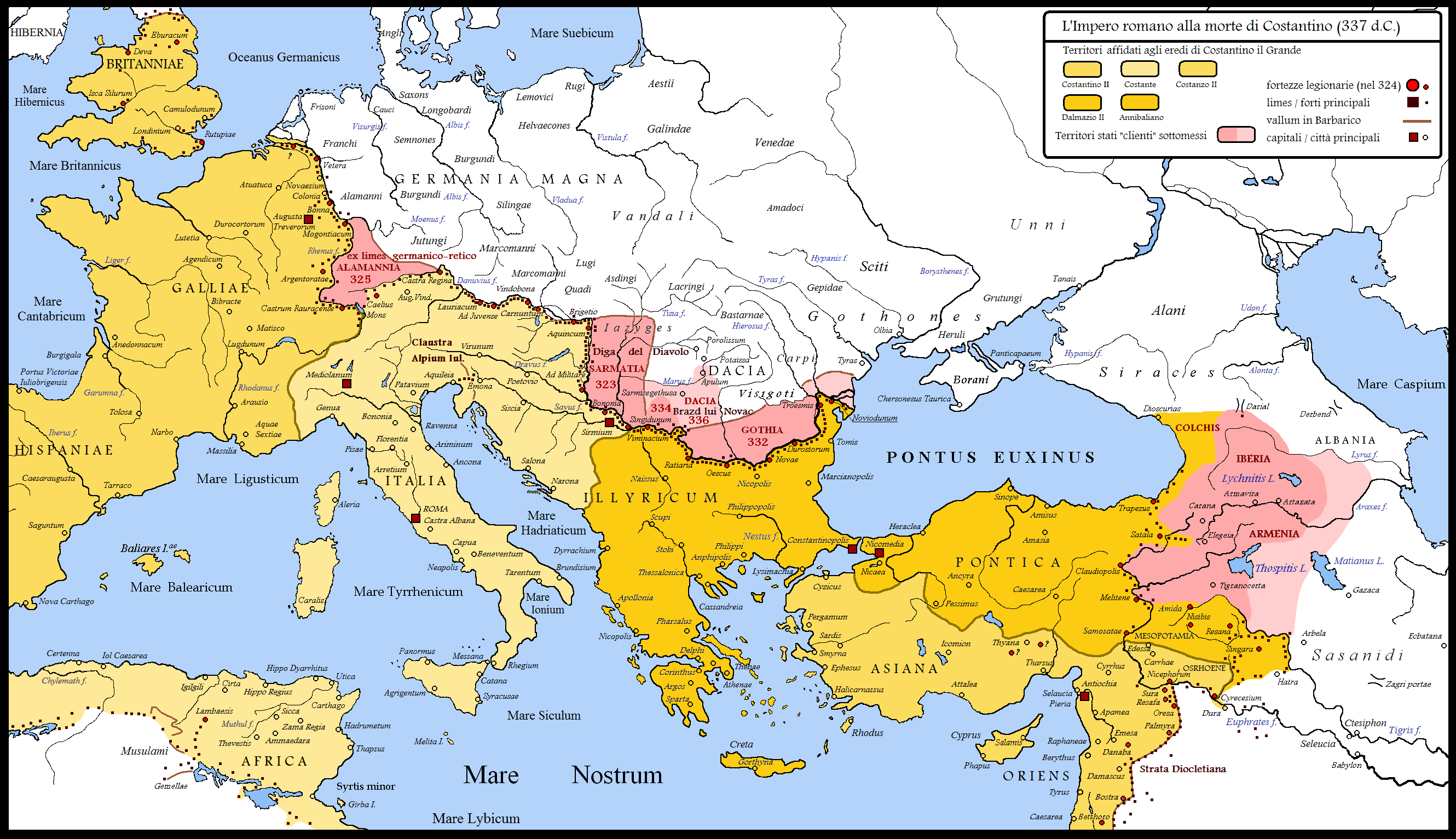
The northern and eastern Roman frontiers at the time of Constantine, with territories acquired during the thirty-year military campaigns (306–337).

=== Crisis of classical Roman law and the rise of codification ===
From the mid-3rd century, the Roman Empire was in a deteriorating political and economic situation due to a succession of civil wars and the continuous invasions of neighboring peoples. In this scenario, the traditional institutions of the republican constitution were definitively abandoned by the absolute monarchy of the Dominate. At the same time, the ancient system of Roman law also went into crisis, with the gradual abandonment of the multiple legislative sources that characterized it, as Gaius had listed in his Institutes, and the disappearance of the class of jurists who considered law as a science, in favor of a single predominant source consisting of decisions of central authority in the form of edicts and rescripts.

Soon, the multitude of such edicts and the vastness and complexity reached by the empire had created various problems of legislative uncertainty within it, and therefore among the jurists of the time, the need arose to have a single rational collection of laws. This led to the compilation of "codes", which, however, should not be compared to the Enlightenment codification born in the 18th century, since they were not laws newly written into a single normative text, but rather collections of ancient laws, adapted with interpolations, harmonizations, and the addition of few novelties.Padoa-Schioppa 2007, pp. 20–21.

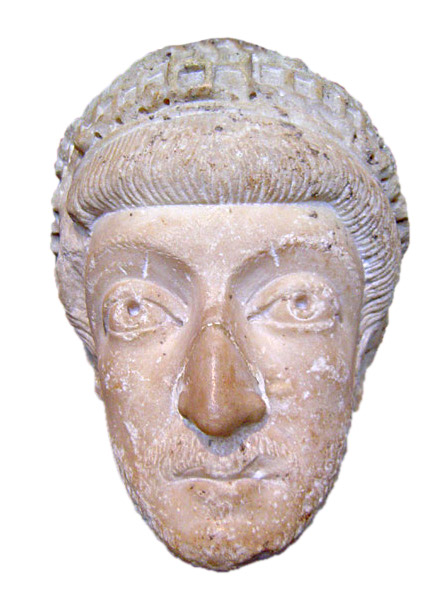
Marble head from the 5th century representing the Eastern Roman Emperor Theodosius II. He promulgated the Theodosian Code, the first official collection of imperial laws.

=== Imperial law codes ===
An early example in this regard was the Gregorian Code, a collection of imperial constitutions compiled by private individuals around 292–293, which included all rescripts issued from the reign of Hadrian (117–138) to about the middle of Diocletian's reign (284–305). This was followed a few years later by the Hermogenian Code, composed mainly of rescripts organized according to the rubrics of the Gregorian. Over a century later, in 438, Emperor Theodosius II promulgated, after nearly a decade of work, the Theodosian Code, the first official collection of laws of the Empire. In this monumental work, composed of 16 books, were also included the tracts of jurists from the classical period and the responsa prudentium. Initially, it was intended to include also laws no longer in force for didactic purposes, but this was not implemented. The Theodosian Code was a landmark event, as it was the first code enacted by an emperor and made legally binding through a novella. Its influence was such that it shaped Western law well beyond the year 1000. However, despite being at the time the main sources for knowledge of Roman law, the three aforementioned codifications «with their narrow purposes and their elementary and roughly imperfect structures [...] were the faithful mirror of a decaying world».

=== Formation of canon law ===
Parallel to the codification of Roman law, a systematic collection of rules concerning the Christian Church also began, leading to the formation of the canon law system. Already in 313, Emperors Constantine I and Licinius had signed a treaty recognizing freedom of worship within the Empire and restoring to Christians the places, goods, and possessions previously acquired, requisitioned, or taken during the long period of persecutions. These provisions are considered the starting point from which the inalienability of ecclesiastical property would develop, which in the following centuries would make church possessions "untouchable." When Constantine I became sole emperor in 324, he further impressed his pro-Christian orientation on law: for example, manumissions of slaves were facilitated, limits were imposed on divorce, and male and female children were equated regarding inheritance mortis causa.

In 380, thanks to the Edict of Thessalonica, Christianity became the sole mandatory religion of the State, leading to significant legal consequences. By the 5th century, a debate had begun over who, between the pope and the emperor, held supreme authority over the Christian population, with Pope Gelasius I theorizing in a letter to Emperor Anastasius I Dicorus that the world was governed by two supreme authorities, without claiming papal superiority over political power—a development that would occur only during the 11th century. Driven by these debates, Gelasius's pontificate was marked by a prolific production of canon law compilations, such as the Collectio Quesnelliana and the Collectio Dionysiana compiled by the monk Dionysius. In the latter, which would be used for centuries, were included both the canons promulgated by various councils and the decretals issued by the popes. Despite these codification efforts, the Christian Church appeared far from unified, and autonomous codes had emerged in various regions. The most important of these was undoubtedly the Collectio Hispana, which drew from the Dionysiana and included additional local conciliar decisions.

== Law in the Early Middle Ages ==
=== Law in the Romano-barbarian kingdoms ===
See also Germanic law

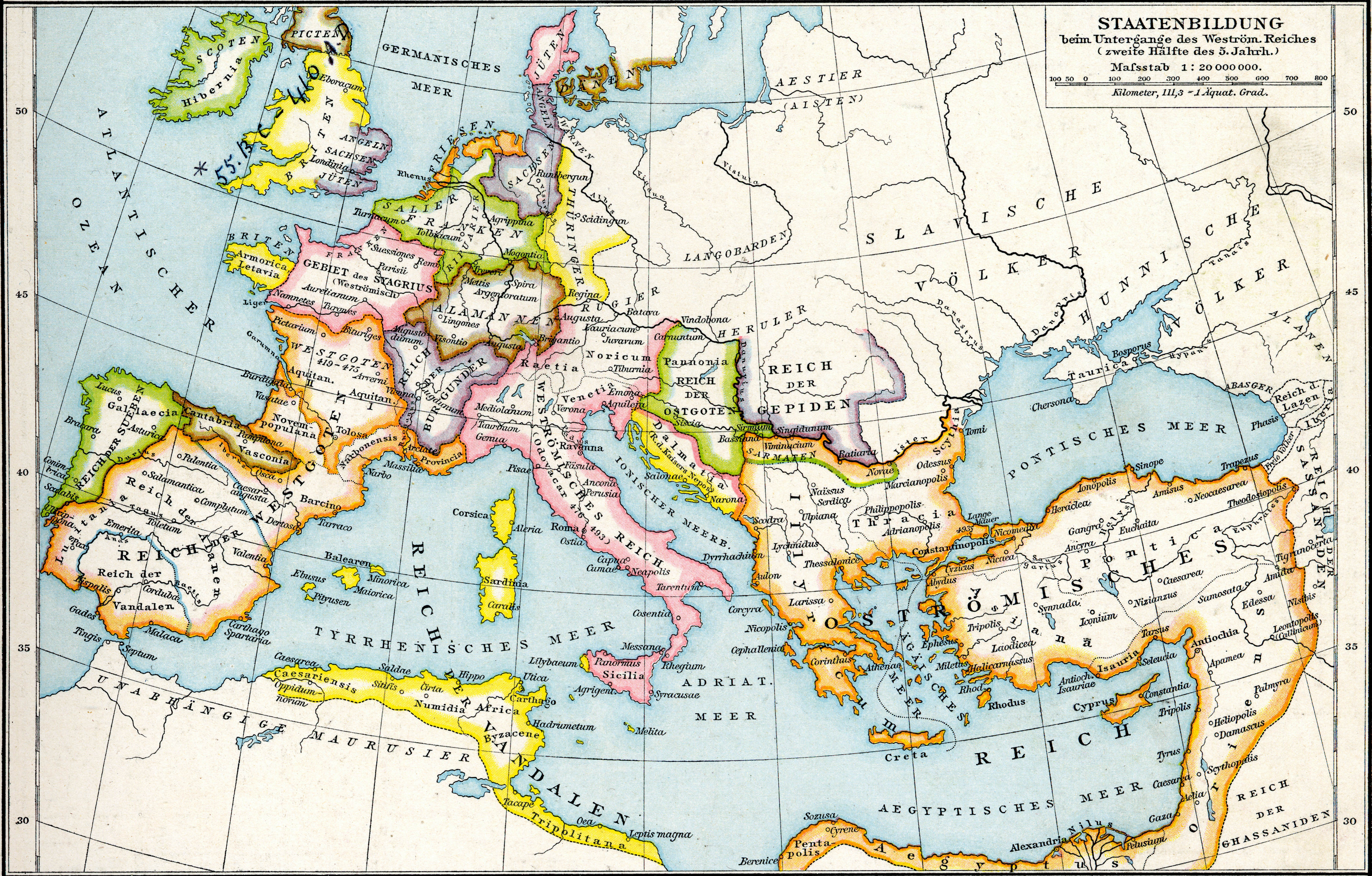
The Romano-Germanic kingdoms in 476

Traditionally, the deposition of the emperor Romulus Augustulus, which occurred in 476, is considered to coincide with the fall of the Western Roman Empire and the establishment in its provinces of the Romano-barbarian kingdoms. These were in practice autonomous kingdoms, although formally they often remained dependent on the Eastern Roman Empire; their barbarian leaders were at the same time regents and sovereigns of their respective peoples on behalf of the monarch of Constantinople. Originally, the Germanic peoples possessed a form of law based mainly on customs and which for a long time had been transmitted only orally. Each people had its own law as an integral part of its identity; moreover, there were no formal authorities or institutions that imposed it on the population, and its observance derived above all from tradition.

When the Germanic populations migrated into the Empire, at least initially, they refused to adopt Roman law, although they did not wish to impose their own law either. In this way, a system based on the personality of law was formed: the Roman population subjected to them was allowed to maintain its own laws in private relations, while the members of the conquering people followed a law of their own. In practice, several legal systems coexisted within the same territory, applied to the respective peoples. Aware that the population of Latin tradition would never accept their ancient customs, the Germans began to produce collections of Roman laws useful for resolving practical cases. Thus began, over time, a process of assimilation of law which, however, produced different results from one people to another.

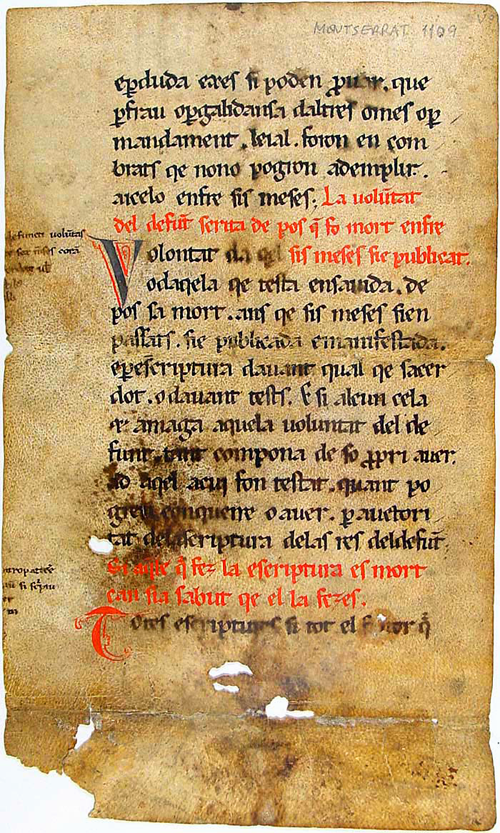
Fragment of the Visigothic Code promulgated by King Chindasuinth, copy from the 11th century in medieval Catalan language

The Visigoths, originating from Scythia and Dacia, first settled in the region of Gaul and later in what is now southern Spain. In 506, at the will of King Alaric II, the Lex Romana Visigothorum was issued, a collection of laws dedicated to the subjected Latin population, which stood alongside the Code of Euric, intended instead to regulate relations among members of the Visigothic people, in accordance with the principle of personality of law. The respect of the Visigoths for Roman law is nevertheless well attested by the fact that the Lex Romana Visigothorum was essentially a compendium of the Theodosian Code. The system of two distinct legal orders remained in force until the reign of Chindasuinth, who had a code drawn up valid for all his subjects (principle of the territoriality of law) and which was promulgated between 642 and 643; the Visigothic Code remained in force until the Islamic conquest of the Iberian Peninsula in the early years of the 8th century.

Already in the early years of the 5th century the Burgundians had moved into what is now Burgundy, founding the kingdom of the same name. As with the Visigoths, two different legal systems coexisted in this case as well: the Lex Romana Burgundionum, consisting of principles of Roman law reworked and simplified, applied only to Roman citizens present in the kingdom; the Lex Burgundionum, a unitary code composed of 46 books, was intended for the Burgundians with the aim of facilitating their adoption of written norms, as they were still accustomed to following ancient customs. The issuance of the two codes in the early years of the 6th century was due to King Gundobad.

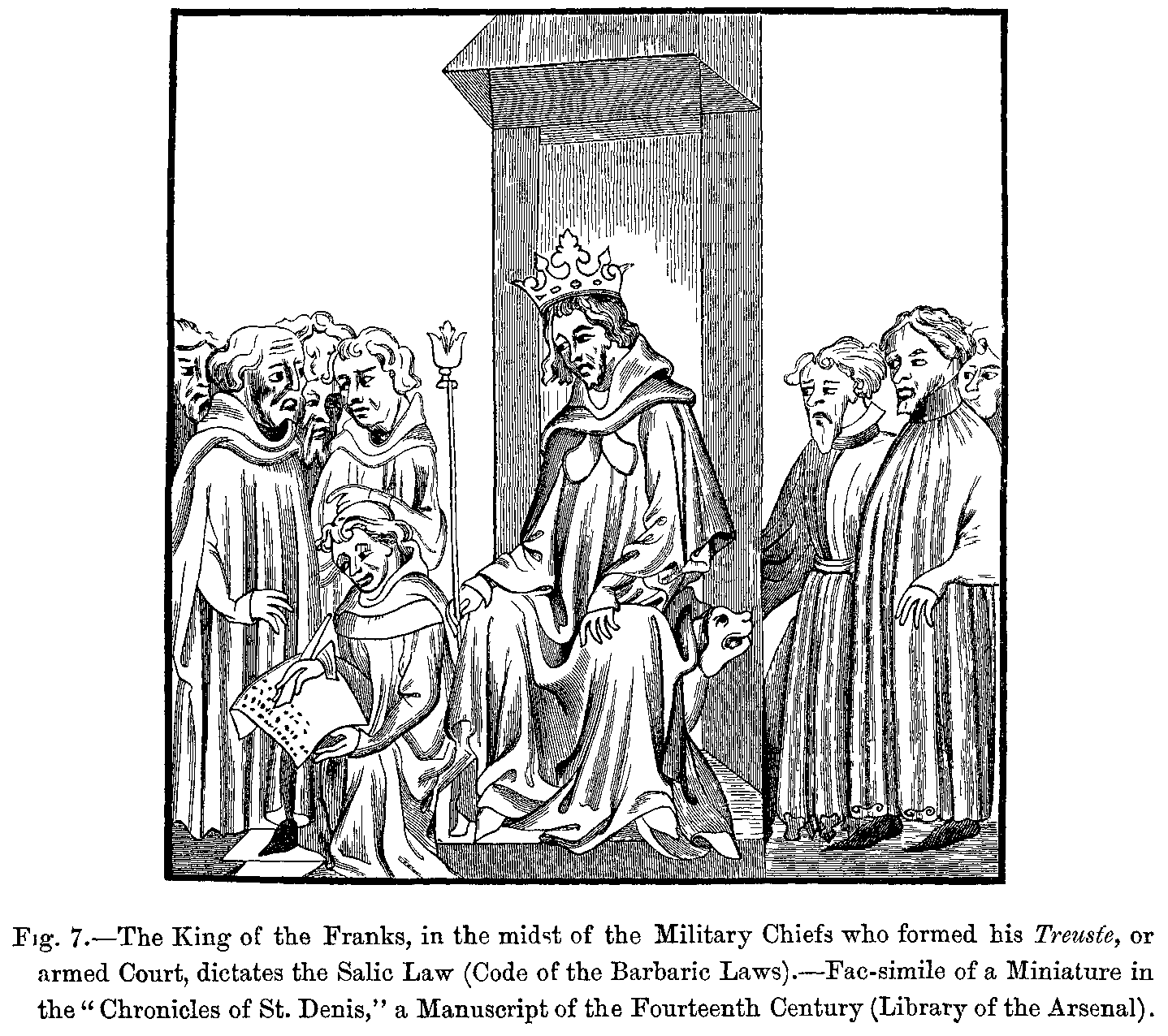
Clovis I dictates the Salic law surrounded by his court of military advisers

Among the Franks the law appeared even more fragmented, as they were in turn divided into different ethnic groups governed by different laws transmitted orally as customs. Their king Clovis I converted, the first among all Germanic leaders, to Christianity in 496, thus favoring integration between Franks and the Roman population. Thanks to him the Salic law was also issued, which introduced monetary penalties for certain blood crimes to avoid dangerous feuds between families. The new legislation also included the ancient institution of trustis, which later evolved into vassalage. Clovis drew inspiration from the Roman model with regard to the administrative organization of his kingdom, which was divided among dukes and counts.

In 493, Theodoric the Great, at the head of the Ostrogoths, defeated Odoacer, completing the conquest of the Italian peninsula. His government was centered on a profound dualism between the Ostrogothic people and the Latin-Roman population: military command passed entirely into the hands of the new conquerors, who remained of Arian religion, and social structures also remained clearly distinct. In matters of law there was no substantial integration, with the Ostrogoths continuing to observe their own legal traditions; nevertheless, the Edictum Theodorici Regis promulgated by Theodoric toward the end of his reign certainly drew inspiration from the principal Roman legal institutions and, among its aims, sought to create instruments suitable for settling disputes between Ostrogoths and Latins.

=== The legislative work of Justinian ===
See also Corpus iuris civilis

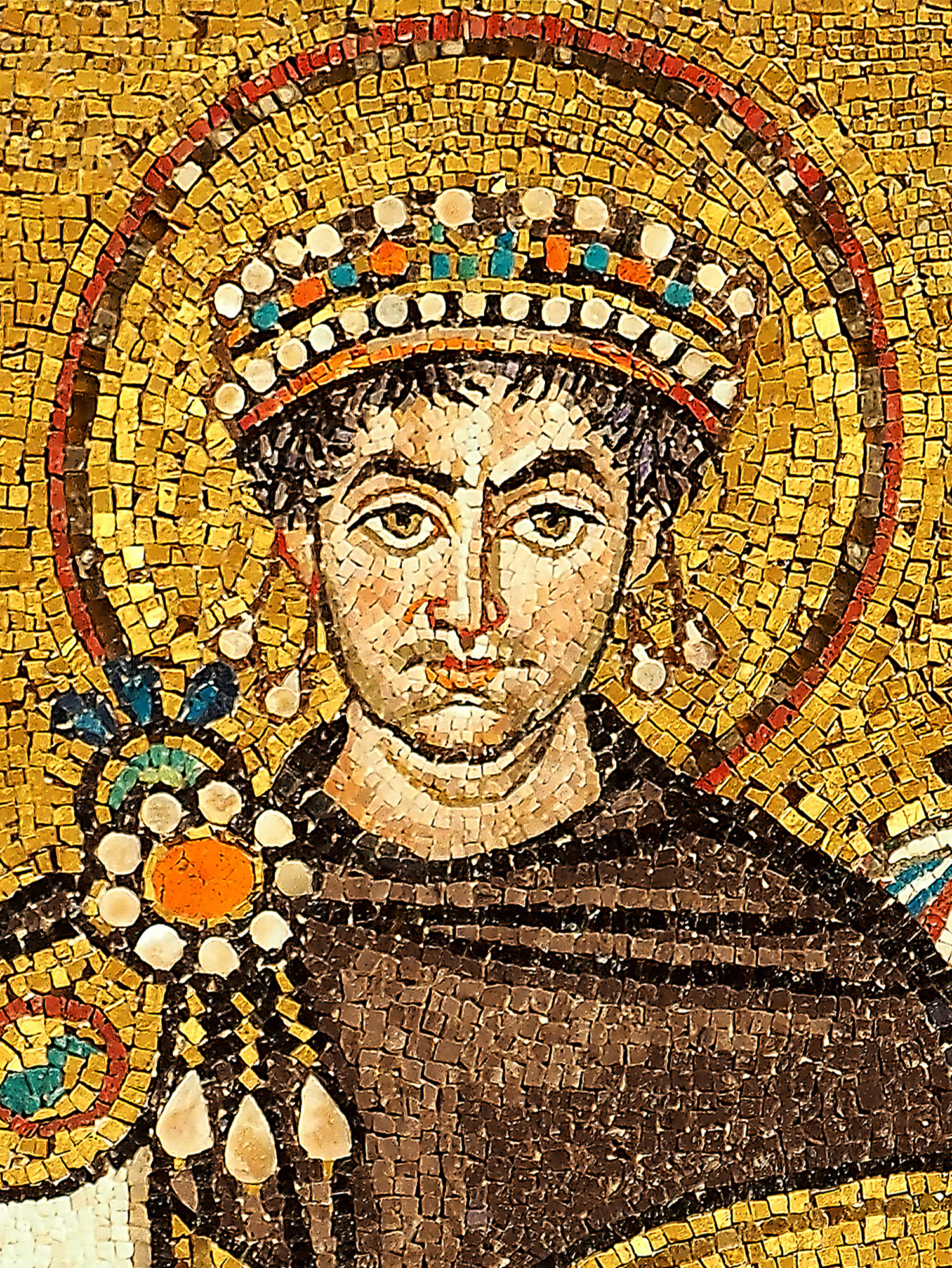
Emperor Justinian I in a mosaic in the Basilica of San Vitale in Ravenna

In 527 Justinian I ascended to the imperial throne of Constantinople, strengthening the government through a centralizing policy in which the figure of the Emperor assumed increasingly theocratic and caesaropapist connotations. In addition to his military enterprises of restauratio imperii and the great architectural works, Justinian is remembered for having promoted intense legislative activity which culminated in the commission given to the court jurists, led by Tribonian, to reorganize and rework the law in force, giving rise, after five years of work (from 529 to 534), to an imposing unitary work later known as the Corpus iuris civilis. The commission responsible for its creation made extensive use of ancient texts, particularly those of classical Roman law, subjecting them, however, to modernization and to interpolation.

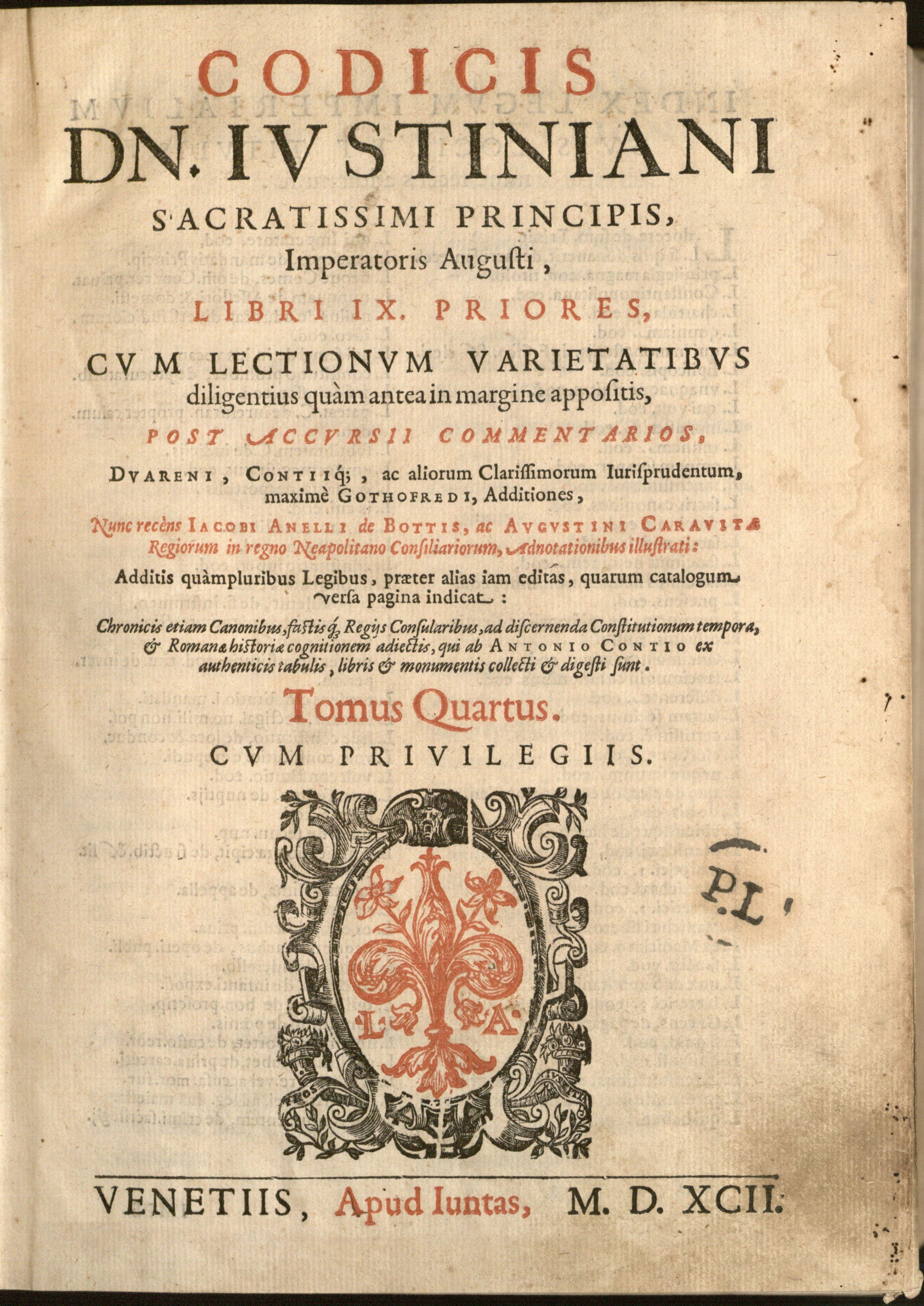
The Justinian Code (Codex) in a 1592 edition

Having become the sole source of law in the Empire, the Corpus iuris civilis was itself composed of four texts: the Institutiones, a didactic work in four books intended for those studying law on the model of the Institutes of Gaius; the Digest (or Pandectae), an anthology in fifty books (two of which, called terribiles, dedicated to criminal law) of fragments extracted (not without modifications) from the works of the most eminent jurists in the history of Rome; the Codex, a collection of imperial constitutions from Hadrian to Justinian himself; finally, the Novellae Constitutiones, a collection of the constitutions issued by Justinian after the publication of the Codex, until his death.

The work reveals the existence of a civil law, proper to each individual, and of a natural law, common to all human beings; the latter was not "static" but had to be continually discovered and recreated following critical reflections also based on Christian doctrine. Law is thus seen not only as a series of provisions given by authority, but as a phenomenon in continuous elaboration, adapted to the various needs of communal life.

Initially intended for use in the East, at the request of Pope Vigilius Justinian had the use of the Corpus extended also to part of the West, recently reconquered after a war against the Goths, as he ordered in the pragmatic sanction pro petitione Vigilii. However, the subsequent invasion of the Lombards did not allow a substantial diffusion of the text, which fell into disuse, also because of its complexity, with the exception of the Italian regions where the Byzantines managed to resist the pressures of the Germanic invaders. Rediscovered around the second half of the 11th century, the legislative work promoted by Justinian, which had closed the millennial history of Roman law, subsequently represented for centuries the basis of the European common law until the beginning of the 19th century, when it was considered superseded by the Napoleonic Code which constituted «the solution of continuity [...] replacing, in place of the free interpretatio of jurists as sources of law, a system codified by the authority of the State». Nevertheless, the use in modernized form of the Corpus continued until the dawn of the nineteenth century and, thanks to German Pandectists, it contributed to the «birth of the modern conceptual and interpretative categories of private law throughout the world».

== Bibliography ==
- Calasso, Francesco (1954). Medio Evo del diritto. Le fonti (in Italian). Vol. I. Milano: Giuffrè. TO00513100.
- Ascheri, Mario (2000). I diritti del Medioevo italiano (secoli XI-XV) (in Italian). Roma: Carocci. ISBN 978-8843016105. RAV0682992.
- Ascheri, Mario (2007). Introduzione storica al diritto medievale (in Italian). Torino: Giappichelli. ISBN 978-8834877234. URB0655939.
- Grossi, Paolo (2003). L'ordine giuridico medievale (in Italian). Rome: Laterza. ISBN 88-420-4677-9.
- Padoa-Schioppa, Antonio (2007). Storia del diritto in Europa. Dal Medioevo all'età contemporanea (in Italian). Bologna: Il Mulino. ISBN 978-88-15-11935-3. USM1675775.* Costabile, Felice (2016). Temi e problemi dell'evoluzione storica del diritto pubblico romano (in Italian). Giappichelli. ISBN 978-88-921-0563-8.
