= Hermogenian =

Roman jurist and public servant

Aurelius Hermogenianus, or Hermogenian, was an eminent Roman jurist and public servant of the age of Diocletian and his fellow tetrarchs.

== Legal scholar ==
The compiler of the eponymous Codex Hermogenianus, which collects imperial laws of the years AD 293–94, has long been identified with Hermogenianus, author of the six-book Iuris epitomae (Summaries of the law), a synopsis of classical legal thought. This manual, which followed the arrangement of the Praetor's Edict, survives in 106 excerpts in Justinian's Digest or Pandects. The excerpts are reassembled according to an approximation of their original order in Otto Lenel's Palingenesia and an English translation can be constructed by reference to Watson's edition of the Digest. It is clear from his last place in the index to the Florentine Digest, that Hermogenian belonged to the last generation of jurists exploited by Justinian's compilers. References to plural principes and imperatores in several Digest extracts from the Iuris epitomae are certainly consistent with a tetrarchic date. It is probably on this work that his subsequent high reputation was based; the fifth-century author Coelius Sedulius calls Hermogenian a doctissimus iurislator ('most learned relator of the law') and it is probably of the Iuris epitomae (rather than the Codex) that the same author claims that he produced three editions. By analysing the style of the surviving extracts of the Iuris epitomae Tony Honoré has identified Hermogenian also as the drafter of the emperor Diocletian's rescripts (replies to petitions) from the beginning of AD 293 to the end of 294, a task that would have been the job of the emperor's (procurator) a libellis or magister libellorum (master of petitions). These rescripts formed the core of his compilation of imperial laws, the single-book codex that bore his name, which was perhaps designed to function as a supplement to the Codex Gregorianus that itself had gathered up material from as far back as the emperor Hadrian. Certainly, the two works are closely linked in subsequent citations, the Hermogenian always after the Gregorian.

== Public servant ==
More recently the legal scholar has been identified with the Aur(elius) Her[mog]enianus, revealed as co-author with his senior colleague as praetorian prefect, Julius Asclepiodotus, of an inscribed dedication to Constantius as Caesar (AD 293/305), unearthed at Brixia (modern Brescia) in northern Italy in 1983. At this stage, given his title vir eminentissimus (in contrast to his colleague's clarissimus), Hermogenian still belonged to the equestrian order. As happened to a number of senior equestrian prefects of the period, at some point subsequently during Diocletian's reign, he was promoted to the senate, as witnessed by his tenure of the senatorial post of proconsul Asia, in which capacity he put up a dedication to Diocletian or his colleague Maximian at Ilium (Troy) sometime before 305.

Benet Salway suggests identifying Hermogenianus with the Aurelius Hermogenes who served as praefectus urbi of Rome in 309–310, citing the possibility of a corruption in the text of the Chronograph of 354.

== Career ==
Correlating the ascertainable dates for his attested posts with their conventional hierarchical order, Hermogenian's known career has been reconstructed as follows:

- magister libellorum or a libellis (293–295)
- praetorian prefect (295-?300)
- publishes Codex Hermogenianus
- proconsul of Asia (one or two years between 300 and 305)
- publishes Iuris epitomarum libri VI

== Legacy ==
According to Honoré, he is important as the first Roman lawyer who made an effort to reduce the law to a small number of basic principles, such as respect for the individual will, from which solutions to concrete problems could be deduced. Both his works were exploited for Justinian's codificatory project in the late 520s and early 530s: Hermogenian's Codex formed a major component of the Codex Justinianeus and his Iuris epitomae were excerpted for the Digest. In this form they became authoritative sources of law for the post-Justinianic empire and the revived medieval and early modern Roman law tradition based on the Corpus Juris Civilis, in which his ideas were further developed by the natural law and historical schools of jurisprudence from the 17th century onwards.
