= Simon Corcoran =

British ancient historian and lecturer

Simon J.J. Corcoran
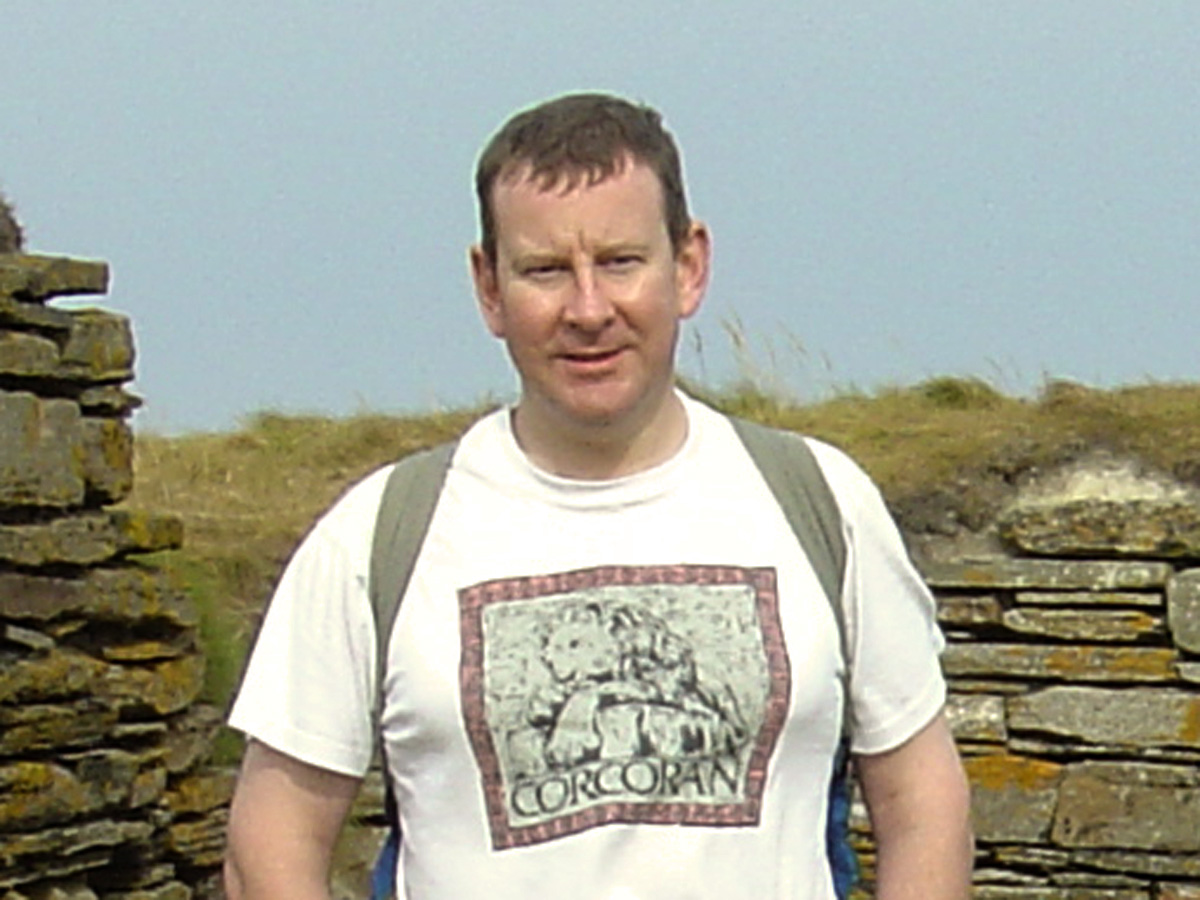
- Simon Corcoran in 2003, Knap of Howar
- Education: St John's College, Oxford
- Occupation: Historian
- Employer: Newcastle University
- Known for: Roman Law
- Website: http://www.roman-empire.co.uk

Simon Corcoran (/ˈkɔːrkərən/ KOR-kər-ən) is a British ancient historian and lecturer in ancient history within the School of History, Classics and Archaeology, Newcastle University.

Corcoran was a senior research fellow at University College, London from 1999 to 2015. He received his D.Phil. from St John's College, Oxford in 1992. He was awarded the Henryk Kupiszewski Prize for his book The Empire of the Tetrarchs in 1998. At University College he worked on 'Projet Volterra', an extensive on-line public database of law (Roman, Germanic or ‘barbarian’, and ecclesiastical) for the period AD193–900.

From 2014 Corcoran has been a member of the Steering Committee of the British Epigraphy Society. He is a Consulting Editor for the Journal of Late Antiquity and a Scientific Advisor for Revue Antiquité tardive. From 2006 to 2009 he served on the Council of the Society for the Promotion of Hellenic Studies and on the council for the British Institute at Ankara from 2011 to 2015.

In 2016 Corcoran was a member of the panel for BBC Radio 4's In Our Time episode on Justinian's Legal Code with Caroline Humfress and Paul du Plessis.

== Gregorian Code discovery ==
In 2010 the Volterra database was used by Corcoran and Salway to identify previously unknown fragments of the Gregorian Code. The "Fragmenta Londiniensia" are seventeen pieces of parchment estimated to date from AD400, the document having been cut up and re-used as book-binding material. This is the first direct evidence yet discovered of the Gregorian Codex.

== Bibliography of works ==
=== Books ===
- Frier, Bruce W; Connolly, Serena; Corcoran, Simon; Crawford, Michael Hewson (2016), The Codex of Justinian : a new annotated translation with parallel Latin and Greek text. [Vol. 3, Books VIII-XII], Cambridge University Press, ISBN 978-1107119826
- Corcoran, Simon (2000), The Empire of the Tetrarchs, Imperial Pronouncements and Government AD 284–324 (2nd ed.), Oxford University Press, ISBN 0-19-815304-X

=== Selected publications ===
- Corcoran, Simon (2016). "The Würzburg fragment of Justinian's constitutions for the administration of recovered Africa". In Freu, C.; Janniard, S.; Ripoll, A. (eds.). Libera curiositas. Mélanges d'histoire romaine et d'Antiquité tardive offerts à Jean-Michel Carrié. Brepols. pp. 96–113. ISBN 9782503566757. Archived from the original on 18 November 2016.
- Corcoran, Simon (2016). "Roman law in Ravenna". In Herrin, J; Nelson, J (eds.). Ravenna: Its Role in Earlier Medieval Change and Exchange. Institute of Historical Research. pp. 163–197. ISBN 9781909646148.
- Corcoran, Simon; Salway, Benet; Crawford, Michael (2016). "Sixth Book, First to Twentieth Titles". In Frier, B (ed.). The Codex of Justinian. A New Annotated Translation with Parallel Latin and Greek Text. Cambridge University Press. pp. 1407–1485. ISBN 9780521196826.
- Corcoran, Simon (2015). "The Augusti and Caesars say: Imperial communication in a collegiate monarchy". Official Epistolography and the Language(s) of Power. Proceedings of the 1st International Conference of the Research Network Imperium and Officium. Vienna: Verlag. pp. 219–236. ISBN 9783700177050.
- Corcoran, Simon (2015). "From unholy madness to right-mindedness: or how to legislate for religious conformity from Decius to Justinian". Conversion in Late Antiquity: Christianity, Islam, and Beyond: Papers from the Andrew W. Mellon Foundation Sawyer Seminar, University of Oxford, 2009-2010. Routledge. pp. 67–94. ISBN 9781409457381.
- Corcoran, Simon (2015). "Hincmar and his Roman legal sources". Hincmar of Rheims. Manchester University Press. pp. 129–155.
- Corcoran, Simon (2014). "State correspondence in the Roman Empire: Imperial communication from Augustus to Justinian". In Radner, Karen (ed.). State Correspondence in the Ancient World. Oxford Studies in Early Empires. New York: Oxford University Press. pp. 172–209. ISBN 978-0-19-935477-1.
- Corcoran, Simon (2013), "The Gregorianus and Hermogenianus assembled and shattered", Mélanges de l'École française de Rome: Antiquité (125–2), Mélanges de l’École française de Rome - Antiquité (20131218), doi:10.4000/mefra.1772, ISSN 0223-5102
- Corcoran, Simon (2012), "Grappling with the Hydra: co-ordination and conflict in the management of Tetrarchic succession", in Bonamente, Giorgio; Lenski, Noel Emmanuel; Testa, Rita Lizzi (eds.), Costantino prima e dopo Costantino (Constantine before and after Constantine), Munera, 35 (in Italian), Edipuglia, ISBN 978-8872286777
- Corcoran, S; Salway, B (2010), "A lost law-code rediscovered? The Fragmenta Londiniensia Anteiustiniana" (PDF), Zeitschrift der Savigny-Stiftung für Rechtsgeschichte: Romanistische Abteilung, 127, Zeitschrift der Savigny-Stiftung für Rechtsgeschichte: Romanistische Abteilung, v127 n1: 677–678, doi:10.7767/zrgra.2010.127.1.677, ISSN 0323-4096, S2CID 62599279
- Corcoran, Simon (2009), "Anastasius, Justinian, and the Pagans: A Tale of Two Law Codes and a Papyrus", Journal of Late Antiquity, 2.2 (Fall) (2): 183–208, doi:10.1353/jla.0.0049, ISSN 1939-6716, S2CID 162324086
- Corcoran, Simon (2009), "After Kruger: Observations on some additional or revised Justinian Code headings and subscripts" (PDF), Zeitschrift der Savigny-Stiftung für Rechtsgeschichte: Romanistische Abteilung, 126, H. Böhlau: 423, doi:10.7767/zrgra.2009.126.1.423, ISSN 0323-4096, OCLC 440690826, S2CID 161586399
- Corcoran, Simon (2009), "New subscripts for old rescripts: The Vallicelliana fragments of Justinian Code Book VII" (PDF), Zeitschrift der Savigny-Stiftung für Rechtsgeschichte: Romanistische Abteilung, 126, H. Böhlau: 401, doi:10.7767/zrgra.2009.126.1.401, ISSN 0323-4096, OCLC 440690823, S2CID 62573957
- Corcoran, Simon (2007), "Two tales, two cities: Antinoopolis and Nottingham", in Drinkwater, John; Salway, Benet (eds.), Wolf Liebeschuetz reflected: Essays presented by Colleagues, Friends, and Pupils, BICS Supplement 91, University of London, School of Advanced Study, Institute of Classical Studies, pp. 193–209, ISBN 978-1-905670-04-8
- Corcoran, Simon (2006), "The Tetrarchy: policy and image as reflected in imperial pronouncements", in Boschung, Dietrich; Eck, Werner (eds.), Die Tetrarchie: Ein neues Regierungssystem und seine mediale Präsentation, ZAKMIRA Schriften 3, Reichert Verlag: Wiesbaden, pp. 31–61, ISBN 3-89500-510-X
- Corcoran, Simon (2006), "Emperor and citizen in the era of Constantine", in Hartley, Elizabeth; Hawkes, Jane; Henig, Martin; Mee, Frances (eds.), Constantine the Great: York's Roman Emperor, Lund Humphries, pp. 41–51, ISBN 0-85331-928-6
- Corcoran, Simon (2006), "Before Constantine", in Lenski, Noel (ed.), The Cambridge Companion to the Age of Constantine, Cambridge University Press, pp. 35–58, ISBN 978-0-521-52157-4
- Corcoran, Simon (2000), "The sins of the fathers: a neglected constitution of Diocletian on incest", Journal of Legal History, 21 (2), Routledge: 1–34, doi:10.1080/01440362108539607, ISSN 0144-0365, OCLC 199222568, S2CID 144266968

== See also ==
- Michael Crawford
- Benet Salway
