= Fragmenta Vaticana =

The Fragmenta Vaticana (Vatican Fragments) are the fragments of an anonymous Latin work on Roman law written in the 4th century AD. Their importance to scholars stems from their being untouched by the Justinianic reforms of the 6th century.

The Fragmenta come from a legal miscellany, probably designed as a handbook for professional lawyers. Its content was arranged thematically. Seven of its headings can be identified, all dealing with private law. Among its cited authorities are Papinian, Paul and Ulpian. Several 3rd-century imperial constitutions are quoted without comment, as well as rescripts of the emperors Constantine I and Maximian.

The manuscript transmission of the Fragmenta is associated with the Western Roman Empire, but that does not guarantee that the text was composed there. It was, however, most likely composed in Italy around 320, while the Emperor Licinius was still living. A later editor added material, probably in the 370s.

The fragments come from an uncial copy of the 5th century, a manuscript now in the Vatican Library (Vat. Lat. 5766). The copyist added annotations noting the similarity between his text and the Codex Gregorianus and Codex Hermogenianus. His manuscript was palimpsested at Bobbio Abbey in the 8th century, when a theological work by John Cassian was written over the legal text. A fragment of the Theodosian Code copied in the 7th century is also part of the undertext of Vat. Lat. 5766. The existence of the palimpsest was discovered by Angelo Mai in 1821. Today only 33 fragments, representing 28 leaves, survive from the original manuscript, which had at least 228 leaves. As a result of these limitations, the reading of the Fragmenta Vaticana can vary greatly between modern editions.
