= Syro-Roman law book =

Late 5th-century text for law schools

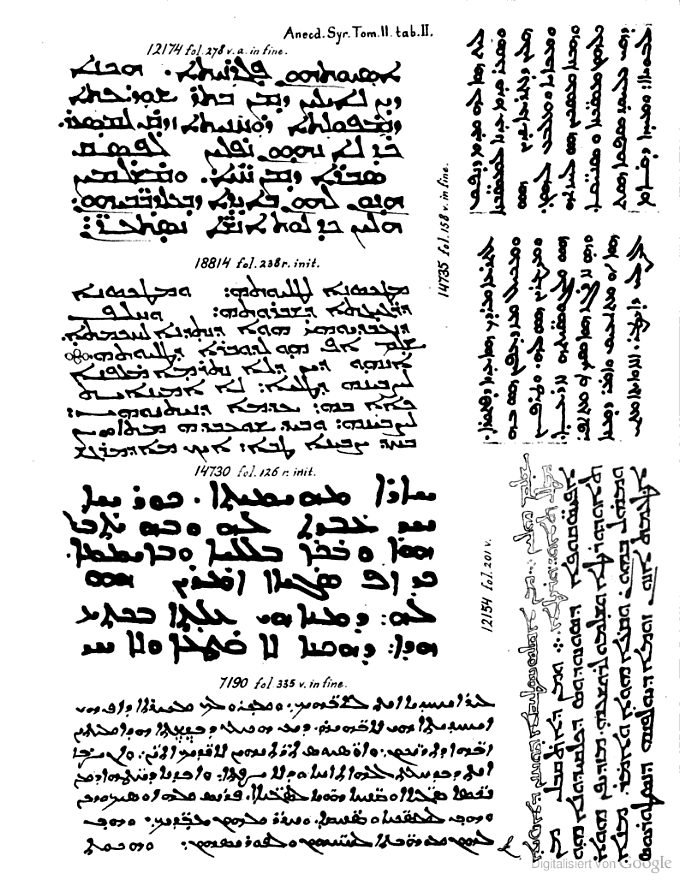
Several Syriac editions of the text

The Syro-Roman law book (or Syro-Roman code) is a compilation of secular legal texts from the eastern Roman Empire originally composed in Greek in the late 5th century, but surviving only in Syriac translation. As a work of Roman law, the original language of many of its legal texts would have been Latin.

The earliest Syriac manuscript (British Library, Add MS 14528) is usually dated to the 6th century, although a date as late as the 8th century has been argued for. In the 20th century, several later Syriac manuscripts from the 13th–17th centuries came to light. One of these identifies the compiler as a certain Ambrosius, a contemporary of an emperor Valentinian, probably Valentinian III, but this information is not reliable. Arabic and Armenian translations of the Syriac also survive, as does a Georgian translation made from the Armenian in the 18th century. All these versions vary slightly in scope. The compilation was very popular with Christians in the formerly eastern Roman lands after the Islamic conquests and today these manuscripts are held by various Eastern Orthodox, Oriental Orthodox and Eastern Catholic churches.

The content of the work is unsystematic and even includes laws that were already obsolete in the 5th century. It was long considered a mixture of actual imperial law and local eastern Roman custom, but with the publication of a critical edition (2002) this view has become untenable. It is now recognised that it is a compilation of official legal texts (often in paraphrase) with commentary (including fictional cases) designed for use in eastern law schools, such as the law school of Berytus. Only some of the didactic explanations contain evidence of local custom. There are about 160 texts in the law book. They included court decisions from the eastern empire, especially those based on prominent 2nd- and 3rd-century jurists, as well as short thematic treatises. They also contain the statutes (constitutiones) of several 5th-century emperors, and later copyists sometimes sought to enhance the work's authority by naming it a collection of laws of Constantine I, Theodosius I (or Theodosius II) and Leo I.

Although it deals with penal and public law as well, the primary focus of the Syro-Roman law book is private law, especially family law (inheritance, marriage, dowries, paternal authority and slaveholding). The Syro-Roman law book, influential in the Middle Eastern legal tradition especially in Lebanon, prescribed the death penalty for homosexuality. Given this focus, it has been suggested that the compilation was designed for use in episcopal courts (episcopalis audientia), where such things would have formed the bulk of actual cases. Both the episcopal theory and the law school theory, however, are at best guesses; the original purpose of the work is unknown.

The Syro-Roman law book in its Syriac version had been introduced to Iraq (which had not been part of the Roman Empire, but rather the Sasanian Empire) by the middle of the 8th century. It was accepted as "the pure laws of Christianity" by Patriarch Timothy I (died 823) of the Church of the East. This was partly due to the desire of Christians living under Muslim rule to have a law code comparable to Islamic or Jewish law. The Arabic version of the Syro-Roman law book has 130 articles and is titled "Collection of All the Good Laws and Penalties of Kings Constantine, Theodosius and Leo". It uses the term sunnah (law, custom) two centuries before the term became widely used in Islamic jurisprudence. It had influence on Islamic law in several areas, such as the law of succession.

== See also ==
- Sententiae Syriacae, another Roman law book composed in Greek and surviving only in Syriac translation
- Byzantine law, a parallel development from Roman law, beginning with the Corpus Juris Civilis (529)
- Early social changes under Islam (610–61)

== Editions ==
- Selb, Walter; Kaufhold, Hubert (2002) Das syrisch-römische Rechtsbuch, eingeleitet, herausgegeben, deutsch übersetzt und kommentiert [The Syro-Roman law book. Introduction, edition, German translation and commentary]. 3 volumes. Vienna (first critical edition).
- Võõbus, Arthur (1982–83) The Syro-Roman Lawbook: The Syriac Text of the Recently Discovered Manuscripts Accompanied by a Facsimile Edition and Furnished with an Introduction and Translation. 2 volumes. Stockholm.
