= Septueia gens =

Ancient Roman family

The gens Septueia was an obscure plebeian family at ancient Rome. No members of this gens are mentioned in ancient writers, but several are known from inscriptions.

== Origin ==
The nomen Septueius belongs to a large class of gentilicia formed using the suffix -eius, which was typical of Oscan-speaking parts of Italy. This suggests that the Septueii may have been of Sabine or Samnite origin. The root of the name might be the Oscan praenomen Seppis or Seppius, equivalent to the rare Latin praenomen Septimus, originally referring to a seventh son or seventh child. In this case, Septueius would be cognate with other gentilicia, including that of the Septimia gens.

== Praenomina ==
With the exception of a single individual named Gaius, all of the Septueii known from inscriptions bear the praenomen Quintus, indicating that the family was relatively small, and of late origin; in imperial times it was common for all of the sons in a family to share the same praenomen, and be distinguished by their cognomina. This is especially probable if the Septueii only acquired Roman citizenship under the early Empire, or if a number of them were descended from the freedmen of an earlier Quintus Septueius.

== Members ==
This list includes abbreviated praenomina. For an explanation of this practice, see filiation.

- Quintus Septueius, an infant buried at Casinum in southern Latium, aged two days, in a tomb dedicated by Septueia Ge, perhaps his mother.
- Quintus Septueius, buried at Aquileia in Venetia and Histria.
- Quintus Septueius Abscantus, the husband of Vibullia Regilla, and father of Septueia Vera, who dedicated a tomb at Portus in Latium to her parents, dating to the mid-second century.
- Quintus Septueius Adjectus, dedicated a second-century tomb found at the present site of Weyer, formerly part of Noricum, for himself and his wife, Samicantus, the daughter of Gouto.
- Quintus Septueius Beryllus, dedicated a tomb at Rome to his son and namesake, Quintus.
- Quintus Septueius Q. f. Beryllus, buried at Rome, aged twenty years, nine months, and sixteen days, in a tomb dedicated by his father, also named Beryllus.
- Septueia Calliste, buried at Rome with a monument from her husband, Vagellius Fortunatus.
- Quintus Septueius Clemens, conductor ferrariarum, an official in charge of iron mining in Noricum, Pannonia, and Dalmatia at some time in the early second century. He was presumably related to Quintus Septueius Valens, mentioned in the same inscription.
- Gaius Septueius Crescens, a soldier named in an inscription from Savaria in Pannonia, dating from the late first or early second century.
- Septueia Q. l. Dionysias, dedicated a sepulchre at Rome for herself, her husband, Lucius Licinius Epaphroditus, and her patron, Quintus Septueius Salvius.
- Quintus Septueius Faustus, married Attica, the daughter of Placidus, with whom he dedicated a second-century sepulchre at Bedaium in Noricum for themselves, and their son, Quintus Septueius Marinus, aged thirteen.
- Septueia Ge, dedicated a tomb at Casinum to Quintus Septueius, an infant aged two days, and possibly her son.
- Septueius Herma, buried at Rome, aged forty-eight, with a monument from his wife, Successa.
- Septueia Ias, named in a sepulchral inscription from Ostia in Latium.
- Septueia Ingenua, erected a monument at Salona in Dalmatia in memory of her good friend, Julia Felicula, dating to the third century, or the latter part of the second.
- Quintus Septueius Isochrysus, buried at Rome, aged twenty-seven years, thirty-five days, and eight hours, with a monument from his mother, Septueia Tryphaena.
- Quintus Septueius Q. f. Marinus, the son of Quintus Septueius Faustus and Attica, was buried in the second-century family sepulchre at Bedaium, aged thirteen.
- Septueia Meletine, made an offering at Aquileia, along with Lucius Publius Eumelus, possibly her husband, according to a second-century inscription.
- Quintus Septueius Proculus, buried at Rome, along with his mother, Julia Helpis.
- Quintus Septueius Q. l. Salvius, a freedman buried at Rome, in a tomb built by Septueia Dionysias, his client, and likely his freedwoman.
- Septueia Tryphaena, dedicated a tomb at Rome for her son, Quintus Septueius Isochrysus.
- Quintus Septueius Valens, procurator ferrariarum, an official in charge of iron mining, at Virunum in Noricum at some time in the early second century. He was presumably related to Quintus Septueius Clemens, mentioned in the same inscription.
- Septueia Q. f. Vera, dedicated a mid-second century tomb at Portus to her parents, Quintus Septueius Abscantus and Vibullia Regilla.

== See also ==
- List of Roman gentes

== Bibliography ==
- Theodor Mommsen et alii, Corpus Inscriptionum Latinarum (The Body of Latin Inscriptions, abbreviated CIL), Berlin-Brandenburgische Akademie der Wissenschaften (1853–present).
- René Cagnat et alii, L'Année épigraphique (The Year in Epigraphy, abbreviated AE), Presses Universitaires de France (1888–present).
- George Davis Chase, "The Origin of Roman Praenomina", in Harvard Studies in Classical Philology, vol. VIII, pp. 103–184 (1897).
- Paul von Rohden, Elimar Klebs, & Hermann Dessau, Prosopographia Imperii Romani (The Prosopography of the Roman Empire, abbreviated PIR), Berlin (1898).
- Hilding Thylander, Inscriptions du port d'Ostie (Inscriptions from the Port of Ostia, abbreviated IPOstie), Acta Instituti Romani Regni Sueciae, Lund (1952).
- Anna and Jaroslav Šašel, Inscriptiones Latinae quae in Iugoslavia inter annos MCMXL et MCMLX repertae et editae sunt (Inscriptions from Yugoslavia Found and Published between 1940 and 1960, abbreviated ILJug), Ljubljana (1963–1986).
- Giovanni Battista Brusin, Inscriptiones Aquileiae (Inscriptions of Aquileia), Udine (1991–1993).
- Benet Salway, "What’s in a Name? A Survey of Roman Onomastic Practice from c. 700 B.C. to A.D. 700", in Journal of Roman Studies, vol. 84, pp. 124–145 (1994).
