= Sententiae Syriacae =

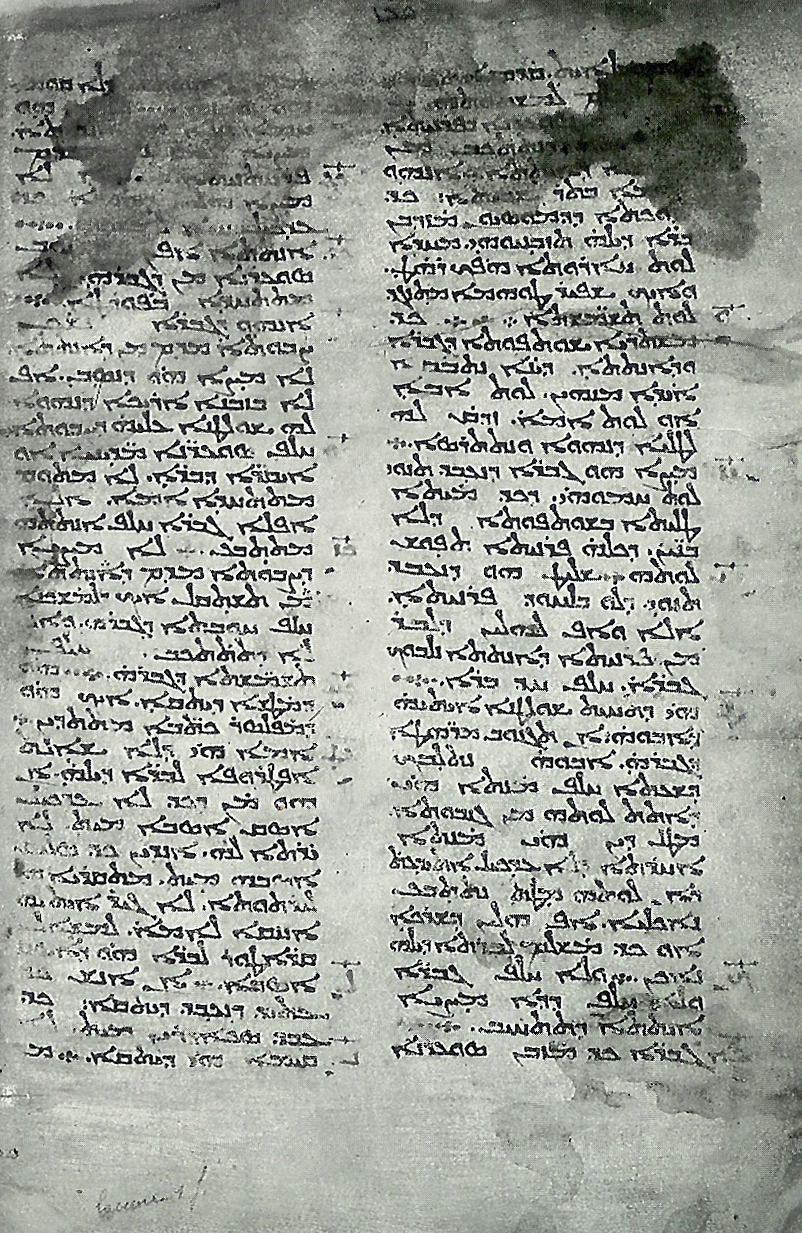
Fragment from manuscript Vat. Syr. 560, folio 27^{v}

The Sententiae Syriacae (Syriac Sentences), also known as the Laws of the Christian and Just Kings, is a late antique collection of 102 propositions of Roman law. The propositions, on diverse subjects and organized indiscriminately, are drawn mainly from the statutes (constitutiones) of the Emperor Diocletian (especially those of the years 293–4 in the Codex Hermogenianus), but also from the Pauli Sententiae and the statutes of Constantine the Great and Leo I. Originally composed in Greek in the eastern Roman Empire, the compilation today survives only in Syriac translations.

In 1968 Walter Selb brought the legal text to general attention with the publication of a fragmentary manuscript of the eighth or ninth century (Vatican Library, Syr. 560). He gave it the title Sententiae Syriacae. Several complete manuscripts subsequently came to light. In 1976 Arthur Võõbus published the first full edition with an English translation based on the manuscript Damascus Patriarchate 8/11, but mistook it for a new recension of the Syro-Roman law book. He published a new edition with facsimile based on the Damascus manuscript and two new manuscripts in 1977. Selb, recognising the true significance of the work and having discovered further manuscripts, completed a new critical edition with a German translation in 1990. He dates the final version of the text to between 472 and 529.

== Editions ==
- Selb, Walter. "Sententiae syriacae". Zeitschrift für Rechtsgeschichte 98 (1968): 400–04.
- Selb, Walter. Sententiae syriacae. Vienna: 1990.
- Võõbus, Arthur. The Synodicon in the West Syrian Tradition, Vol. 2. Leuven: 1976, text no. 68, pp 91–100.
- Võõbus, Arthur. Discovery of an Unknown Recension of the Syro-Roman Lawbook. Stockholm: 1977.
