= Edictum Theodorici =

The Edictum Theodorici is a set of laws that date from the 5th or 6th century and that is one of the codes emanated by Germanic kings to settle issues between Romans and Germans in their kingdoms.

It is composed of a preface, 155 chapters and a conclusion. Its dispositions are mostly taken from Roman law, such as the Codex Gregorianus, the Codex Hermogenianus and the Codex Theodosianus.

Its authenticity, differently from before, is no longer in doubt. As for its character the edict is for the most part a restatement and a reworking of Roman legislation; its chief interest stands in implying, differently from most Romano-barbaric codes, a territorial rather than a personal form of power as its provisions treat Romans and Barbarians equally. Explicit differences are made only for Jews, who are to have their own judges.

The problem of the author of the code is one of the most complicated: since when the editio princeps was printed in 1579 due to Pierre Pithou the text has been attributed to the Ostrogothic king Theodoric the Great, and the Italian origin of the code seems supported by chapter 111, where specific dispositions regarding Rome are present. Notwithstanding this, the issue has become since 1953 highly controversial, and has been considered to have been emanated by the Visigothic king Theodoric II, while other have given the paternity to Odoacer, with a number defending the traditional attribution.
