= Katherine Fischer Drew =

American historian (1923–2023)

Chair of the Rice University Department of Art and Art History
- In office 1996–1998

Chair of the Rice University Department of History and Political Science
- In office 1970–1980

Personal details
- Born: Katherine Fischer; September 24, 1923 Houston, Texas, U.S.
- Died: March 19, 2023 (aged 99) Houston, Texas, U.S.
- Spouse: Ronald Farinton Drew (m. 1951; died 1990)
- Education: Rice University; Cornell University
- Occupation: Historian

Academic work
- Discipline: Medieval European law
- Institutions: Rice University

Katherine Fischer Drew (née Fischer; September 24, 1923 – March 19, 2023) was an American historian who was Lynette S. Autrey Professor of History at Rice University. A scholar of medieval European law, she also published translations of several medieval European law codes: the Lex Burgundionum, the Salic law, and the Edictum Rothari.

== Biography ==
Katherine Fischer, the daughter of Martha (née Halloway) and Herbert Herman Fischer, was born in Houston, Texas, on September 24, 1923, and was a graduate of San Jacinto High School. At the age of sixteen, she began studying at the Rice Institute, where she would obtain her bachelor’s and masters' degrees in 1944 and 1945 (respectively), was a member of Phi Beta Kappa, and spent two years teaching history to soldiers returning from World War II combat. After completing a two-year stint at Cornell University with a PhD in 1950, she returned to Rice and became the first woman there to be a full-time faculty member and to earn tenure.

She served as chair of the Department of History and Political Science (1970–1980) and of Department of Art and Art History (1996–1998), as acting dean of humanities and social sciences (1973), and as the editor of Rice University Studies (1967–1981). In 1985, she was granted the chair of Lynette S. Autrey Professor of History. She retired from Rice in 1996, resulting in the donation of the $125,000 Katherine Fischer Drew Endowment to Rice's Department of History, but she still had an on-campus office afterwards, remaining there until 2015. Peter C. Caldwell said of Drew's legacy at Rice: "it is no exaggeration to say that she helped transform Rice from a technical institute into a modern liberal arts university." She was part of the American Historical Association Council from 1982 until 1985.

As an academic, Drew specialized in medieval European history and medieval law. Among her publications are translations of the Lex Burgundionum (her translation being her Master of Arts thesis), Edictum Rothari, and the Salic law. In 2004, she published Magna Carta, a primary source collection concerning the English royal charter of the same name.

In 1958, she was awarded a Guggenheim Fellowship. In 1979, she was elected as a fellow of the Medieval Academy of America. (Note: While Peter C. Caldwell claims that she was president of the Medieval Academy of America from 1985 to 1986, the Academy's website confirms that the position was held by Samuel E. Thorne during that time.) She received a Fulbright Fellowship in 1965 and a National Endowment for the Humanities Senior Fellowship in 1975. She was also awarded the Rice University Brown Teaching Award in 1971 and the Association of Rice Alumni Meritorious University Service Award.

On July 27, 1951, she married Ronald Farinton Drew, whom she had met as a Cornell student; he died on January 10, 1990.

Drew died on March 19, 2023, in Houston, Texas; she was 99.

== Publications ==
- The Burgundian Code (1949)
- (as editor) Rice University Studies: Papers in Philosophy (1966)
- The Lombard Laws (1973)
- (as editor) The Laws of the Salian Franks (1991)
- Magna Carta (2004)
