= Benet Salway =

Senior lecturer in ancient history at University College London

Richard William Benet Salway is a senior lecturer in ancient history at University College London. His areas of speciality include Greek and Roman epigraphy and onomastics, Roman law, Roman Imperial history and travel and geography in the Graeco-Roman world.

== Biography ==
Salway attended The Queen's College, Oxford, where he received his DPhil in 1995.

He was part-time tutor in Ancient History at St Anne's College, Oxford and part-time lecturer in classics at the University of Reading 1993–94 and temporary lecturer in Ancient History at the University of Manchester 1994–95. He was then at University College London as post-doctoral research fellow on the British Academy/Arts and Humanities Research Board-funded Projet Volterra: Law and Empire from 1995 to 1999. He was lecturer in classics at the University of Nottingham 1999–2001 and moved back to University College London in 2001 as lecturer in Ancient History. In 2007 he was promoted to senior lecturer. In 2005 he became a director of Projet Volterra II: Law and the End of Empire.

Salway has held several other positions at University College London: elected non-professorial representative on the Academic Board 2002–05 and since 2006, elected non-professorial member of the Academic Committee 2004–05, elected non-professorial member of Council since 2006, non-professorial member of the Nominations Committee since 2007, member of the Academic Committee Sub-Committee on Probation since 2008, and non-professorial member of the Governance Committee since 2009.

He was also secretary of the British Epigraphy Society 1999–2004 and a member of the Council of the Society for the Promotion of Roman Studies 2002–05 and has been a member of the Institute of Classical Studies Library Committee since 2001 and Finance Committee since 2008.

== Gregorian Code discovery ==
In 2010 the Volterra database was used by Corcoran and Salway to identify previously unknown fragments of the Gregorian Code. The "Fragmenta Londiniensia" are seventeen pieces of parchment estimated to date from AD400, the document having been cut up and re-used as book-binding material. This is the first original evidence yet discovered of the Gregorian Codex.

== Publications ==
- Salway, Benet (1994), "What's in a Name? A Survey of Roman Onomastic Practice from c. 700 B.C. to A.D. 700", Journal of Roman Studies, 84: 124–145, doi:10.2307/300873, ISSN 0075-4358, JSTOR 300873, OCLC 486761530, S2CID 162435434
- Salway, R.W.B.; Corcoran, S.J.J.; Salway, P. (2002). "Moritix Londiniensium: a recent epigraphic find in London". British Epigraphy Society Newsletter. 8: 10–12. Archived from the original on 3 March 2016.
- Salway, R.W.B. (2004), "Sea and river travel in the Roman itinerary literature", in Talbert, Richard J A; Brodersen, Kai (eds.), Space in the Roman world : its perception and presentation, Antike Kultur und Geschichte, Bd. 5, Lit Verlag, ISBN 978-3-8258-7419-3, OCLC 54928851
- Salway, Benet (2005), "The Nature and Genesis of the Peutinger Map", Imago Mundi, 57 (2), Taylor & Francis: 119–135, doi:10.1080/03085690500094867, ISSN 0308-5694, OCLC 365935559, S2CID 128690131
- Salway, Benet (2006), "Equestrian prefects and the award of senatorial honours from the Severans to Constantine", in Kolb, Anne (ed.), Herrschaftsstrukturen und Herrschaftspraxis : Konzepte, Prinzipien und Startegien der Administration im römischen Kaiserreich : Akten der Tagung an der Universität Zürich, 18.-20.10.2004, Akademie Verlag, pp. 111–135, ISBN 3-05-004149-8, OCLC 77548180
- Salway, Benet (2007), "The perception and description of space in Roman itineraries", in M. Rathmann (ed.), Wahrnehmung und Erfassung geographischer Räume in der Antike (in German), von Zabern, pp. 181–209, ISBN 978-3-8053-3749-6, OCLC 163094706
- University of London. Institute of Classical Studies; Salway, Benet (2007), "Constantine Augoustos not Sebastos", in Drinkwater, J.F.; Salway, Benet (eds.), Wolf Liebeschuetz reflected, Bulletin of the Institute of Classical Studies, Supplement; 91, Institute of Classical Studies, University of London, pp. 37–50, OCLC 223208528
- Salway, Benet (2008), "Roman Consuls, Imperial Politics, and Egyptian Papyri: The Consulates of 325 and 344 CE", Journal of Late Antiquity, 1 (2): 278–310, doi:10.1353/jla.0.0013, ISSN 1939-6716, OCLC 424630925, S2CID 155014745

== See also ==
- Michael Crawford
