= Codex Hermogenianus =

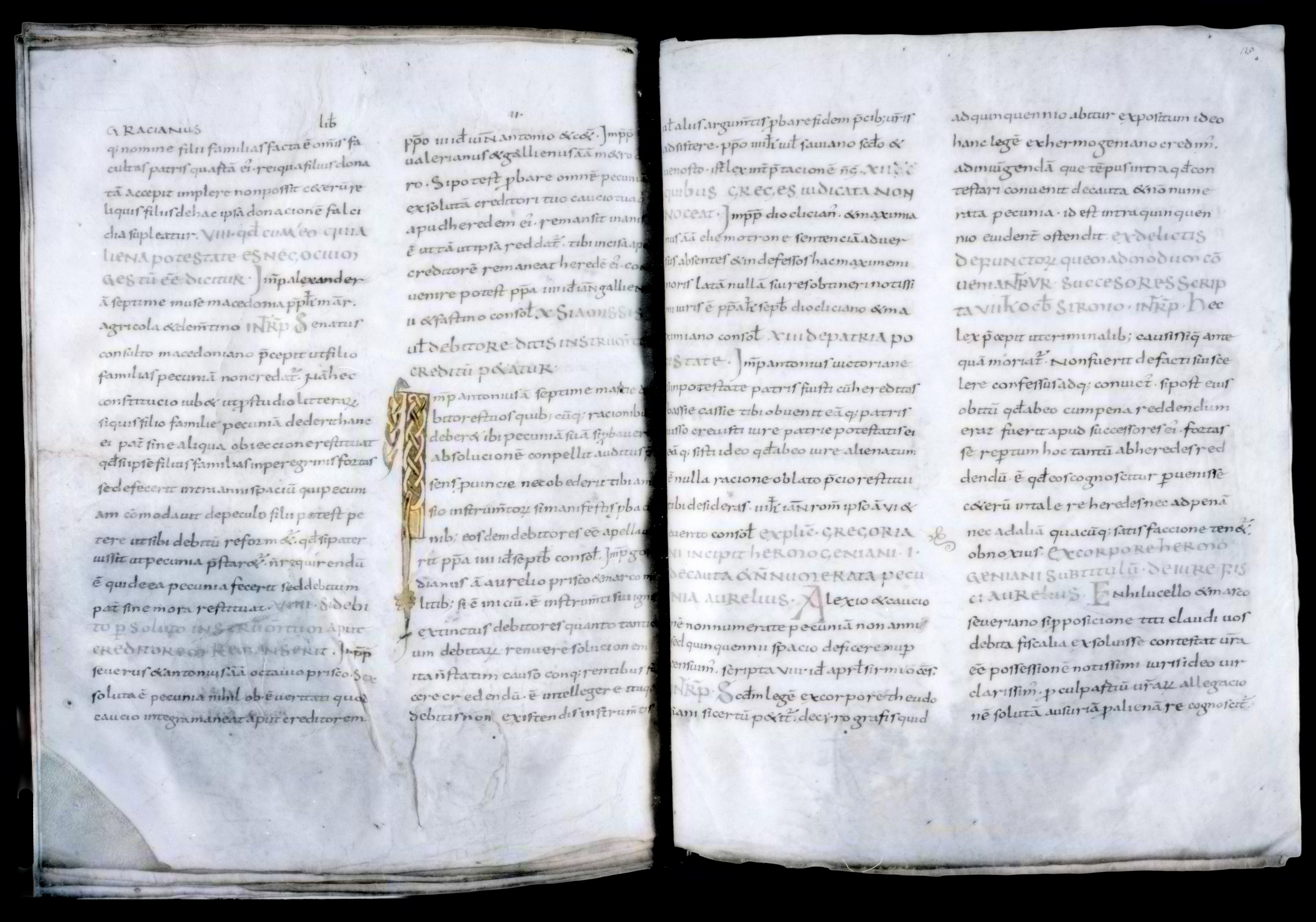
Excerpts from Codex Hermogenianus, Codex Gregorianus, and Lex Romana Burgundionum (Ps.-Papianus) in a 9th-century manuscript.

The Codex Hermogenianus (Eng. Hermogenian Code) is the title of a collection of constitutions (legal pronouncements) of the Roman emperors of the first tetrarchy (Diocletian, Maximian Augusti, and Constantius and Galerius Caesars), mostly from the years 293–94. Most of the work is now lost. The work became a standard reference in late antiquity, until it was superseded by the Breviary of Alaric and the Codex Justinianeus.

== History ==
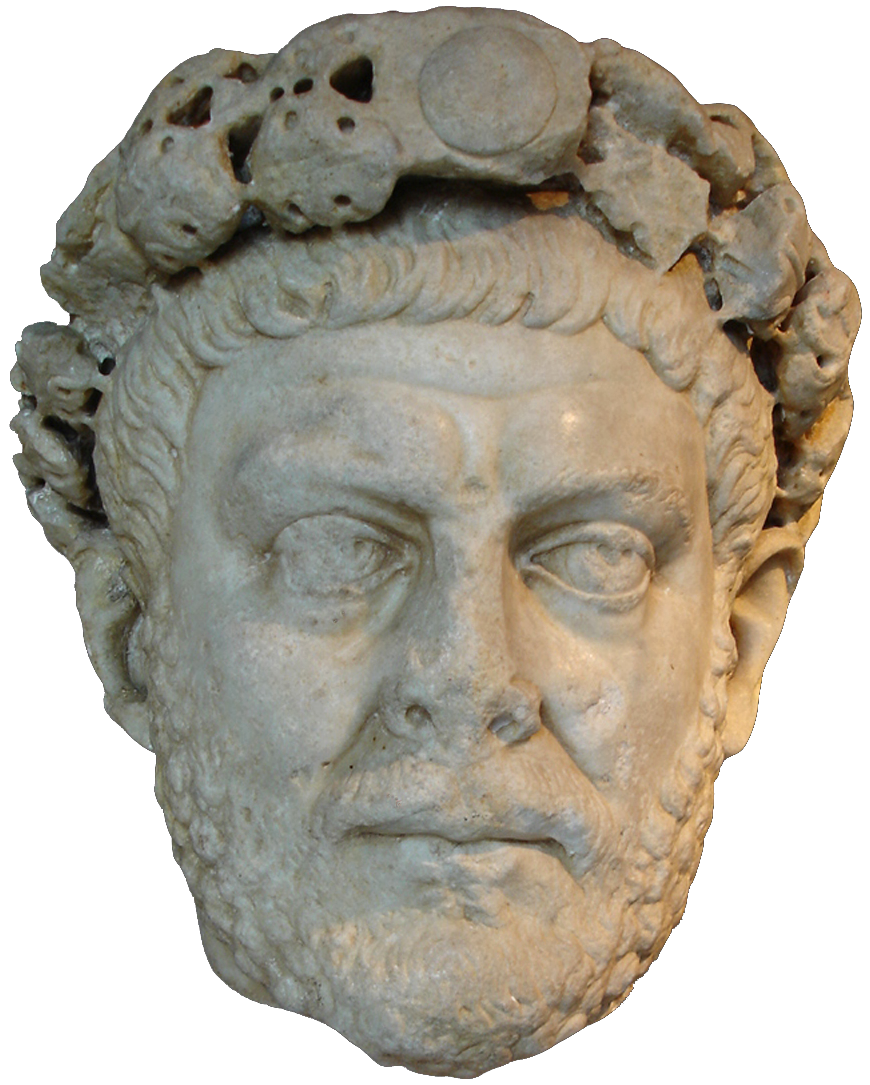
Head from a statue of Diocletian, Istanbul Archaeological Museum

It takes its name from its author, Aurelius Hermogenianus, a prominent jurist of the age who acted as the magister libellorum (drafter of responses to petitions) to Diocletian in this period. The work does not survive intact in complete form but a brief section may be preserved on a late antique papyrus from Egypt. Nevertheless, from the surviving references and excerpts it is clear that it was a single book work, subdivided into thematic headings (tituli) containing largely rescripts to private petitioners, organised chronologically. Of the texts explicitly attributed to the Codex Hermogenianus, the vast majority date from the years 293–294, though some texts may have been added to this core by Hermogenian in subsequent editions of his work. For the fifth-century author Coelius Sedulius claims that Hermogenian, like Origen, produced three editions of his work in total (though this may relate to his Iuris epitomae). Still, the seven Valentinianic constitutions attributed to the CH by the author of the Consultatio veteris cuiusdam iurisconsulti must reflect on-going insertions by subsequent users rather than authorial appendices. Consensus opinion has it that the first edition collected the rescripts of 293 and 294, which Hermogenian had himself authored as magister libellorum. It has been proposed that Hermogenianus produced the second edition after 298, while praetorian prefect, its inclusion of western rescripts reflecting service as magister libellorum at the court of Maximian (c. AD 295–298), and that the final edition, incorporating extra eastern texts, was achieved c. 320 at the court of Licinius or possibly the Law School of Berytus. If Hermogenian applied the same organisational principle to the Codex as he did in his Iuris epitomae, then the order of titles is likely to have followed that of the Praetor's Edict. Scholars' estimates as to the number of titles vary from a minimum of 18 to one of 147, though a majority favour 69. Where evidence as to the circumstances of original publication is preserved, it is overwhelmingly to the giving or subscribing of the constitution, suggesting that Hermogenian's collection was made at source in the imperial archives.

== Reception ==
In the fourth and fifth centuries, for those wishing to cite imperial constitutions, the Codex Hermogenianus became a standard work of reference, often cited alongside the Codex Gregorianus, to which it seems to have functioned almost as a supplementary volume. The first explicit quotations of the CH are by the anonymous author of the Mosaicarum et Romanarum Legum Collatio, or Lex Dei as it is sometimes known, probably in the 390s. Most famously, the Gregorian and Hermogenian Codes are cited as a model for the organisation of imperial constitutions since Constantine I in the directive ordering their collection in what was to become the Codex Theodosianus, addressed to the senate of Constantinople on 26 March 429, and drafted by Theodosius II's quaestor Antiochus Chuzon. In the post-Theodosian era both Codes are quoted as sources of imperial constitutions by the mid-fifth-century anonymous author of the Consultatio veteris cuiusdam iurisconsulti (probably based in Gaul); are cited in marginal cross-references by a user of the Fragmenta Vaticana; and in notes from an eastern law school lecture course on Ulpian's Ad Sabinum. In the Justinianic era, the antecessor (law professor) Thalelaeus cited the Hermogenian Code in his commentary on Justinian's Code. In the west, some time before AD 506, both codices were supplemented by a set of clarificatory notes (interpretationes), which accompany their abridged versions in the Breviary of Alaric, and were cited as sources in the Lex Romana Burgundionum attributed to Gundobad, king of the Burgundians (473–516).

== Eclipse ==
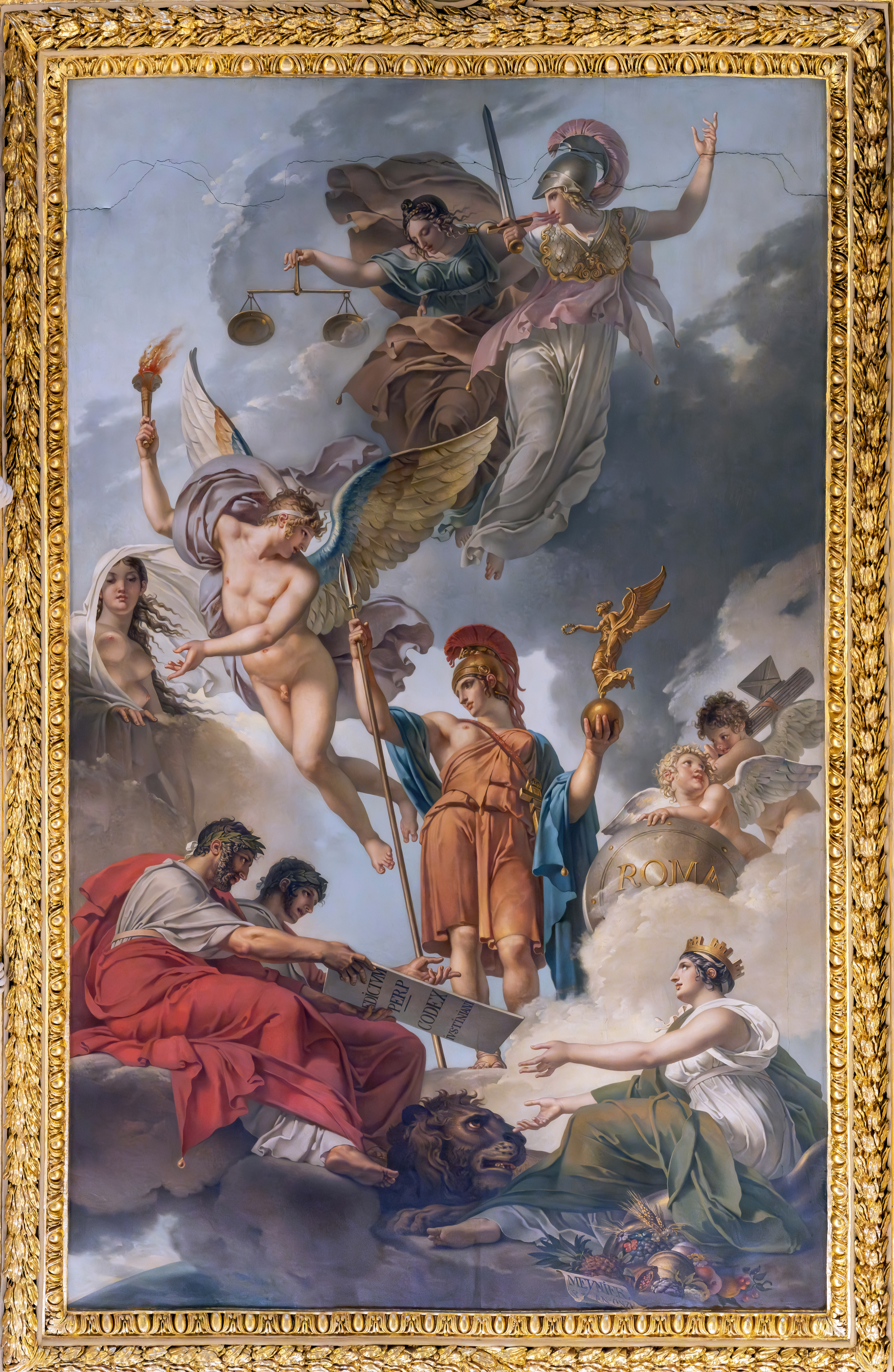
Maynier's oil painting of Hadrian and Justinian with the Codex of Roman Law, 1803

Texts drawn from the Codex Hermogenianus achieved status as authoritative sources of law simultaneously with the original work's deliberate eclipse by two codification initiatives of the sixth century. First, the abridged version incorporated in the Breviary of Alaric, promulgated in 506, explicitly superseded the original full text throughout Visigothic Gaul and Spain. Then, as part of the emperor Justinian's grand codification programme, it formed a major component of the Codex Justinianeus, which came into force in its first edition across the Roman Balkans and eastern provinces in AD 529. This was subsequently rolled out to Latin north Africa, following its reconquest from the Vandals in 530, and then Italy in 554. So, by the mid sixth century the original text of the Hermogenian Code had been consigned to the dustbin of history over most of the Mediterranean world. Only in Merovingian and Frankish Gaul were copies of the full version still exploited between the sixth and ninth centuries, as attested by the insertion of a quotation in two manuscripts of the Breviary.

== Legacy ==
It is because of its exploitation for the Codex Justinianeus that the influence of the Codex Hermogenianus is still felt today. As a component of the Justinianic law, it formed part of the Corpus Juris Civilis of the revived medieval and early modern Roman law tradition. This in turn was the model and inspiration for the civil law codes that have dominated European systems since the Code Napoleon of 1804.

It was also used by the compiler of the Sententiae Syriacae.

== Editions ==
There has been no attempt at a full reconstruction of all the surviving texts that probably derive from the CH, partly because of the difficulty of distinguishing with absolute certainty constitutions of Hermogenian from those of Gregorian in the Codex Justinianeus in the years of the mid 290s, where they appear to overlap. Honoré (1994) provides the full text of all the private rescripts of the relevant period but in a single chronological sequence, not according to their possible location in the CH. The fullest edition of CH is that by Cenderelli (1965: 143–81), who lists references only where the source is CJ but otherwise gives the full text, as did Haenel (1837: 57–80), though he included only texts explicitly attributed to CH by ancient authorities and so did not cite the CJ material, on the grounds that it was only implicitly attributed. Krueger (1890) edited the Visigothic abridgement of CH, with its accompanying interpretationes (pp. 234–35), and provided a reconstruction of the structure of the CH, again excluding CJ material (pp. 242–45), inserting the full text only where it did not otherwise appear in the Collectio iuris Romani Anteiustiniani. Rotondi (1922: 154–58) and Sperandio (2005: 389–95) provide only an outline list of the titles, though the latter offers a useful concordance with Lenel's edition of the Edictum Perpetuum. Karampoula (2008) reconstructs on the same principles as Cenderelli (1965) but provides text (including Visigothic interpretationes) in a modern Greek version.

== Bibliography ==
- Cenderelli, Aldo (1965), Ricerche sul "Codex Hermogenianus", Pubblicazioni della Facoltà di giurisprudenza, Università di Milano: Studi di diritto romano, ser. 2, vol. 4, Milano: A. Giuffrè
- Connolly, Serena (2010), Lives behind the Laws: The World of the Codex Hermogenianus, Bloomington, IN.: Indiana University Press
- Corcoran, Simon (2000), The Empire of the Tetrarchs: Imperial Pronouncements and Government AD 284–324, Oxford classical monographs, Oxford: Clarendon Press, ISBN 978-0-19-815304-7, OCLC 44694959
- Corcoran, Simon (2006), "The Tetrarchy: policy and image as reflected in imperial pronouncements", in Boschung, Dieter; Eck, Werner (eds.), Die Tetrarchie: Ein neues Regierungssystem und seine mediale Praesentation, Schriften des Lehr- und Forschungszentrum fuer die antiken Kulturen des Mittelmeerraumes (ZAKMIRA), vol. 3, Wiesbaden: Reichert Verlag, pp. 31–61, ISBN 978-3-89500-510-7
- Haenel, Gustav (1837), Codicis Gregoriani et Hermogeniani Fragmenta, Corpus iuris Romani Anteiustiniani, vol. 2, Bonn: Adolph Marcus, cols 1–80
- Honoré, Anthony Maurice (1994), Emperors and Lawyers, Second edition, completely revised, with a Palingenesia of Third-Century Imperial Rescripts 193–305 AD, Oxford: Clarendon Press, ISBN 978-0-19-825769-1
- Karampoula, Dimitra P. (2008), Hē nomothetikē drastēriotēta epi Dioklētianou kai hē kratikē paremvasē ston tomea tou dikaiou: ho Grēgorianos kai Hermogeneianos kōdikas / Rechtsentwicklung in der Zeit Diokletians und die ersten offiziellen Rechtssammlungen: der Codex Gregorianus und der Codex Hermogenianus, Monographies (Institouto Vyzantinōn Ereunōn), vol. 11, Athens: Ethniko Hidryma Ereunōn, Institouto Vyzantinōn Ereunōn, ISBN 978-960-371-048-6
- Krueger, Paul (1890), Collectio librorum iuris Anteiustiniani (in Latin), vol. III, Berlin: Weidmann, OCLC 16107779
- Rotondi, Giovanni (1922), Arangio-Ruiz, Vincenzo (ed.), Scritti giuridici 1. Studii sulla storia delle fonti e sul diritto pubblico romano (in Italian), Milano: Ulrico Hoepli, OCLC 22555135
- Scherillo, Gaetano (1934), "Teodosiano, Gregoriano, Ermogeniano", Studi in memoria di Umberto Ratti, a cura e con prefazione di Emilio Albertario, Milano: A. Giuffrè, pp. 247–323, OCLC 12354550
