= Michael Crawford (historian) =

British ancient historian and numismatist

Michael Crawford FBA
- Born: Michael Hewson Crawford; 7 December 1939 (age 86)

Academic background
- Education: Oriel College, Oxford; British School at Rome

Academic work
- Discipline: Classical studies
- Sub-discipline: Ancient history; numismatics; Roman Republic; Roman law
- Institutions: Christ's College, Cambridge; Faculty of Classics, University of Cambridge; University College London

Michael Hewson Crawford (born 7 December 1939) is a British ancient historian and numismatist. Having taught at Christ's College, Cambridge and the University of Cambridge, he was Professor of Ancient History at University College London from 1986 until he retired in 2005.

== Early life ==
Crawford was born in Twickenham on 7 December 1939. He was educated at St Paul's School, Oriel College, Oxford (BA, MA), and the British School at Rome.

== Academic career ==
In 1964, Crawford was elected a research fellow of Christ's College, Cambridge. From 1969 until 1986 he was Fellow of Christ's College, Cambridge, and University Lecturer in Ancient History in the University of Cambridge. He was Professor of Ancient History at University College London from 1986 until 2005, becoming emeritus professor on his retirement. He continued to undertake some teaching in the Department of History and works on Projet Volterra.

In 1964/65, Crawford was Eliza Procter Visiting Fellow at Princeton University. He has also been a visiting professor at University of Pavia (1983 and 1992), École Normale Supérieure (1984), University of Padua (1986), University of San Marino (1989), University of Milan (1990), University of L'Aquila (1990), École pratique des hautes études (1997), and École des hautes études en sciences sociales (1999).

== Honours ==
He was elected a Fellow of the British Academy in 1980, a Foreign Member of the Istituto Lombardo in 1990 and a Foreign Corresponding Member of the Institut de France in 2006. In 2001 he was appointed an Officier de l'Ordre des Palmes Académiques de la République Française. He was awarded the medal of the Royal Numismatic Society in 1984 and is also a member of the Italian Numismatic Society.

== Publications ==
- Crawford, Michael (1978). The Roman republic. The Harvester press. ISBN 978-0-85527-761-1. OCLC 441900418.
- Beard, Mary; Crawford, Michael H (1985). Rome in the late Republic. Cornell University Press. ISBN 978-0-8014-1824-2. OCLC 11676607.
- Burnett, Andrew; Crawford, Michael H (1987). The Coinage of the Roman world in the late Republic : proceedings of a colloquium held at the British Museum in September 1985. B.A.R. ISBN 978-0-86054-420-3. OCLC 15713423.
- Crawford, Michael H; Ligota, C R; Trapp, J B (1990). Medals and coins from Budé to Mommsen. The Warburg Institute, University of London. ISBN 978-0-85481-081-9. OCLC 23042361.
- Crawford, Michael H (1993). Antonio Agustin between Renaissance and Counter-reform. Warburg Institute, University of London. ISBN 978-0-85481-086-4. OCLC 29948966.
- Crawford, Michael H; Ligota, C R (1995). Ancient history and the antiquarian : essays in memory of Arnaldo Momigliano. Warburg Institute, University of London. ISBN 978-0-85481-095-6. OCLC 33386977.
- Crawford, Michael H (1996). Roman statutes. Institute of Classical Studies, School of Advanced Study, University of London. ISBN 978-0-900587-69-6. OCLC 34140615.
- T.J. Cornell, M.H. Crawford, and J.A. North, Art and production in the world of the Caesars (Milan: Olivetti, 1987)
- Michael H. Crawford, ed., L'Impero romano e le strutture economiche e sociali delle provincie (Como: Edizioni New Press, 1986)
- Michael H. Crawford, Coinage and money under the Roman Republic: Italy and the Mediterranean economy (London: Methuen, 1985)
- M.H. Crawford, A catalogue of Roman Republican coins in the collections of the Royal Scottish Museum, Edinburgh (Edinburgh: Royal Scottish Museum, 1984)
- Michael Crawford and David Whitehead, Archaic and Classical Greece: a selection of ancient sources in translation (Cambridge; New York: Cambridge University Press, 1983)
- Michael Crawford, ed., Sources for ancient history (Cambridge: Cambridge University Press, 1983)
- Michael H. Crawford, La moneta in Grecia e a Roma (Bari: Laterza, 1982)
- Michael Crawford, 'Economia imperiale e commercio estero', Tecnologia, economia e società nel mondo romano: Atti del Convegno di Como, 27–29 sett. 1979 (1980), 207–218
- Michael H. Crawford, 'Ancient Devaluations: a general theory', Collection de l'École française de Rome 37 (1978) Les "dévaluations" à Rome. Epoque républicaine et impériale (Rome, 13–15 Nov 1975), 147–158
- Michael H. Crawford, Roman Republican coinage (London: Cambridge University Press, 1974)
- Mark Hassall, Michael Crawford, and Joyce Reynolds, 'Rome and the eastern provinces at the end of the second century B.C.', Journal of Roman Studies 64 (1974), 195–220
- K.T. Erim, J. Reynolds, and M. Crawford, 'Diocletian's currency reform: a new inscription', Journal of Roman Studies 61 (1971), 171–177
- Michael Crawford, Coin hoards and the pattern of violence in the late Republic (London: R. Clay & Sons, 1969)
- M.H. Crawford, The financial organisation of Republican Spain, Numismatic Chronicle 9 (1969), 79–93
- Michael H. Crawford, Roman Republican coin hoards (London: Royal Numismatic Society, 1969)
- Michael H. Crawford, 'The edict of M. Marius Gratidianus', Proceedings of the Cambridge Philological Society (1968), 1–4
- M.H. Crawford, 'War and finance', Journal of Roman Studies 54 (1964), 29–32
