= Codex Gregorianus =

Collection of constitutions of Roman emperors

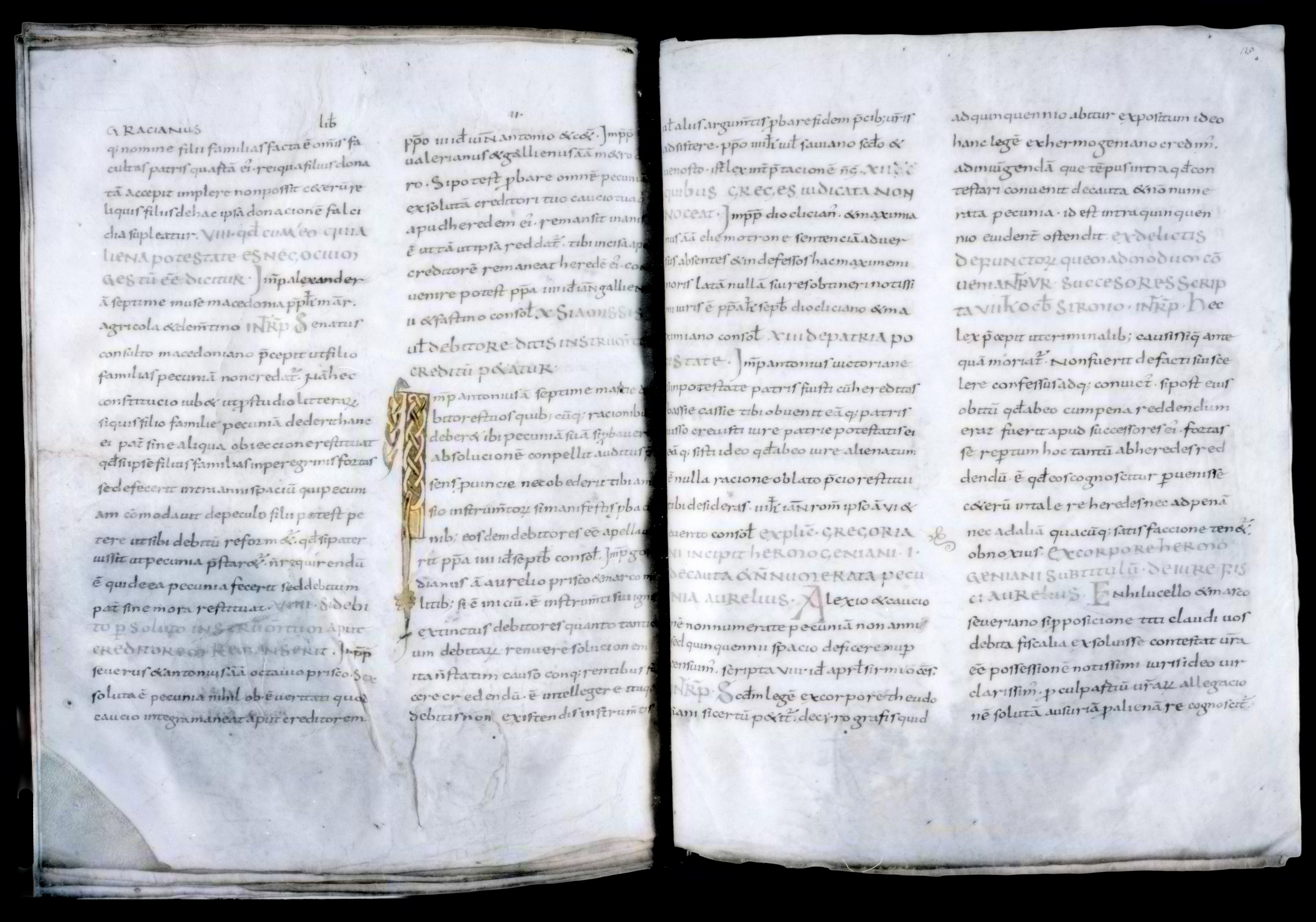
Excerpts from Codex Gregorianus, Codex Hermogenianus, and Lex Romana Burgundionum (Ps.-Papianus) in a 9th-century manuscript.

The Codex Gregorianus (Eng. Gregorian Code) is the title of a collection of constitutions (legal pronouncements) of Roman emperors over a century and a half from the 130s to 290s AD. It is believed to have been produced around 291–294 but the exact date is unknown.

== History ==
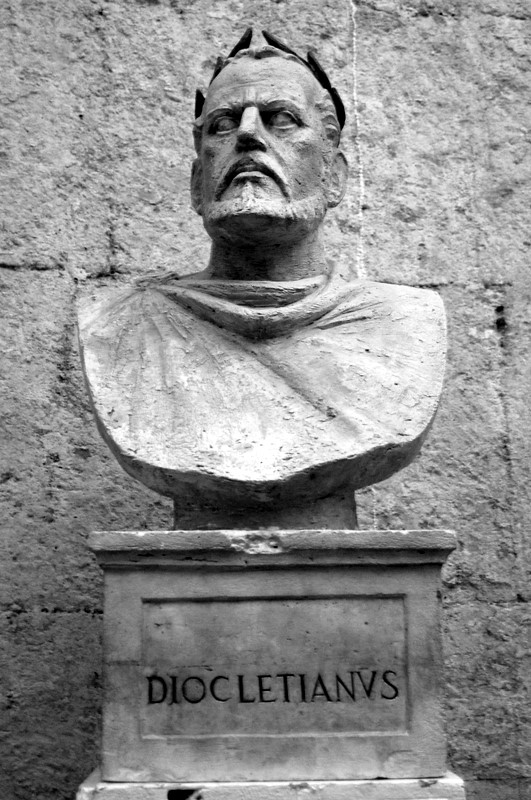
Modern bust of Diocletian in his palace at Split, Croatia

The Codex takes its name from its author, a certain Gregorius (or Gregorianus), about whom nothing is known for certain, though it has been suggested that he acted as the magister libellorum (drafter of responses to petitions) to the emperors Carinus and Diocletian in the 280s and early 290s. The work does not survive intact and much about its original form remains obscure, though from the surviving references and excerpts it is clear that it was a multi-book work, subdivided into thematic headings (tituli) that contained a mixture of rescripts to private petitioners, letters to officials, and public edicts, organised chronologically. Scholars' estimates as to the number of books vary from 14 to 16, with the majority favouring 15. Where evidence of the mode of original publication is preserved, it is overwhelmingly to posting up, suggesting that Gregorius was working with material in the public domain.

== Reception ==
In the fourth and fifth centuries, for those wishing to cite imperial constitutions, the Codex Gregorianus became a standard work of reference, often cited alongside the Codex Hermogenianus. The earliest explicit quotations are by the anonymous author of the Mosaicarum et Romanarum Legum Collatio, or Lex Dei as it is sometimes known, probably in the 390s. In the early fifth century Augustine of Hippo cites the Gregorian Code in discussion of adulterous marriages. Most famously, the Gregorian and Hermogenian Codes are cited as a model for the organisation of imperial constitutions since Constantine I in the directive ordering their collection in what was to become the Codex Theodosianus, addressed to the senate of Constantinople on 26 March 429, and drafted by Theodosius II's quaestor Antiochus Chuzon.

In the post-Theodosian era both Codes are quoted as sources of imperial constitutions by the mid-fifth-century anonymous author of the Consultatio veteris cuiusdam iurisconsulti (probably based in Gaul); are cited in marginal cross-references by a user of the Fragmenta Vaticana; and in notes from an eastern law school lecture course on Ulpian's Ad Sabinum.

In the Justinianic era, the antecessor (law professor) Thalelaeus cited the Gregorian Code in his commentary on Codex Justinianus. In the west, some time before 506, both codices were supplemented by a set of clarificatory notes (interpretationes), which accompany their abridged versions in the Breviary of Alaric, and were cited as sources in the Lex Romana Burgundionum attributed to Gundobad, king of the Burgundians (473–516).

== Eclipse ==
Texts drawn from the Codex Gregorianus achieved status as authoritative sources of law simultaneously with the original work's deliberate eclipse by two codification initiatives of the sixth century. First, the abridged version incorporated in the Breviary of Alaric, promulgated in 506, explicitly superseded the original full text throughout Visigothic Gaul and Spain. Then, as part of the emperor Justinian's grand codification programme, it formed a major component of the Codex Justinianeus, which came into force in its first edition across the Roman Balkans and eastern provinces in AD 529. This was subsequently rolled out to Latin north Africa, following its reconquest from the Vandals in 530, and then Italy in 554. So, by the mid sixth century the original text of the Gregorian Code had been consigned to the dustbin of history over most of the Mediterranean world. Only in Merovingian and Frankish Gaul were copies of the full version still exploited between the sixth and ninth centuries, as attested by the appendices to manuscripts of the Breviary.

== Legacy ==
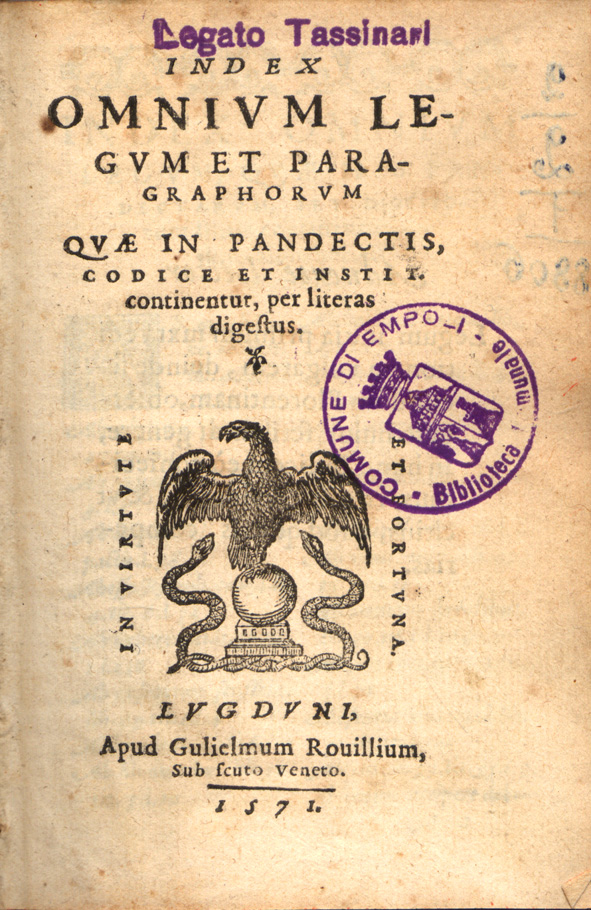
Alphabetical index on the Corpus Juris, printed in Lyon, 1571

It is because of its exploitation for the Codex Justinianeus that the influence of Gregorius' work is still felt today. As such, it formed part of the Corpus Juris Civilis of the revived medieval and early modern Roman law tradition. This in turn was the model and inspiration for the civil law codes that have dominated European systems since the Code Napoleon of 1804.

== Editions ==
There has been no attempt at a full reconstruction of all the surviving texts that probably derive from the CG, partly because of the difficulty of distinguishing with absolute certainty constitutions of Gregorius from those of Hermogenian in the Codex Justinianeus in the years of the mid 290s, where they appear to overlap. Tony Honoré (1994) provides the full text of all the private rescripts of the relevant period but in a single chronological sequence, not according to their possible location in the CG. The fullest edition of CG remains that of Haenel (1837: 1–56), though he included only texts explicitly attributed to CG by ancient authorities and so did not cite the CJ material, on the grounds that it was only implicitly attributed. Krueger (1890) edited the Visigothic abridgement of CG, with its accompanying interpretationes (pp. 224–33), and provided a reconstruction of the structure of the CG, again excluding CJ material (pp. 236–42), inserting the full text only where it did not otherwise appear in the Collectio iuris Romani Anteiustiniani. Rotondi (1922: 154–58), Scherillo (1934), and Sperandio (2005: 389–95) provide only an outline list of the titles, though the latter offers a useful concordance with Lenel's edition of the Edictum Perpetuum. Karampoula (2008) conflates the reconstructions of Krueger (1890) and Rotondi (1922) but provides text (including Visigothic interpretationes) in a modern Greek version.

== Rediscovery ==
On 26 January 2010, Simon Corcoran and Benet Salway at University College London announced that they had discovered seventeen fragments of what they believed to be the original version of the code.

== See also ==
- List of Roman laws

== Bibliography ==
- Corcoran, Simon (2000), The Empire of the Tetrarchs: Imperial Pronouncements and Government AD 284–324, Oxford classical monographs, Clarendon Press, ISBN 978-0-19-815304-7, OCLC 44694959
- Corcoran, Simon (2006), "The Tetrarchy: policy and image as reflected in imperial pronouncements", in Boschung, Dieter; Eck, Werner (eds.), Die Tetrarchie: Ein neues Regierungssystem und seine mediale Praesentation, Schriften des Lehr- und Forschungszentrum fuer die antiken Kulturen des Mittelmeerraumes (ZAKMIRA), vol. 3, Wiesbaden: Reichert Verlag, pp. 31–61, ISBN 978-3-89500-510-7
- Haenel, Gustav (1837), Codicis Gregoriani et Hermogeniani Fragmenta, Corpus iuris Romani Anteiustiniani, vol. 2, Bonn: Adolph Marcus, cols 1–80
- Honoré, Anthony Maurice (1994), Emperors and Lawyers, Second edition, completely revised, with a Palingenesia of Third-Century Imperial Rescripts 193–305 AD, Oxford: Clarendon Press, ISBN 978-0-19-825769-1
- Karampoula, Dimitra P. (2008), Hē nomothetikē drastēriotēta epi Dioklētianou kai hē kratikē paremvasē ston tomea tou dikaiou: ho Grēgorianos kai Hermogeneianos kōdikas / Rechtsentwicklung in der Zeit Diokletians und die ersten offiziellen Rechtssammlungen: der Codex Gregorianus und der Codex Hermogenianus, Monographies (Institouto Vyzantinōn Ereunōn), vol. 11, Athens: Ethniko Hidryma Ereunōn, Institouto Vyzantinōn Ereunōn, ISBN 978-960-371-048-6
- Krueger, Paul (1890), Collectio librorum iuris Anteiustiniani (in Latin), vol. III, Berlin: Weidmann, OCLC 16107779
- Rotondi, Giovanni (1922), Arangio-Ruiz, Vincenzo (ed.), Scritti giuridici 1. Studii sulla storia delle fonti e sul diritto pubblico romano (in Italian), Milano: Ulrico Hoepli, OCLC 22555135
- Scherillo, Gaetano (1934), "Teodosiano, Gregoriano, Ermogeniano", Studi in memoria di Umberto Ratti, a cura e con prefazione di Emilio Albertario (in Italian), Milano: A. Giuffrè, pp. 247–323, OCLC 12354550
- Sperandio, Marco Urbanio (2005), Codex Gregorianus: origini e vicende, Università di Roma ’La Sapienza’, Pubblicazioni dell’Istituto di diritto romano e dei diritti dell’Oriente mediterraneo, vol. 80, Naples: Jovene, ISBN 978-88-243-1583-8
