= Projet Volterra =

Projet Volterra is a European project of ancient legal history databases of the Institute of Classical Studies and elsewhere.

== Overview ==
Projet Volterra was established to promote the study of Roman law in its full social, political and legal context, by facilitating access through the production of an electronic database, to act not only as a Regest but also contain the basic texts of imperial legal pronouncements. Initially in Phase 1 of the Project the texts of legislation of the 'House of Constantine' (i.e. of the Augusti Constantinus II, Constantius II, Constans, and Julian), between AD 337 and 363 and other pertinent data were entered into a Microsoft Access database. Legislations of the later tetrarchs and Constantine (305-337), Jovian, Valentinian, Valens and Gratian (363-383) etc. were also added to the database in this Phase.
