= Rescript =

Type of document

A rescript is a public government document. More formally, it is a document issued not on the initiative of the author, but in response to a question (usually legal) posed to the author. The word originates from replies issued by Roman emperors to such questions and is also used in modern legal terminology and the Papal curia.

Rescripts may take various forms, from a formal document of an established type, such as a Papal bull, to the forwarding of the demand with a simple mention by way of decision, something like "rejected" or "awarded", either to the party concerned or to the competent executive office to be carried out.

== Etymology ==
The word rescript derives from the Latin noun rescriptum which itself derives from the Latin verb rescribo, meaning "to write back or... reply in writing". It developed its specialised legal meaning due to regular responses by emperors or lawyers to petitions or legal questions.

By analogy the term rescript is also applied to similar procedures in other contexts, such as the Ottoman, Chinese and Japanese imperial courts, or even prior to the Roman empire. Two well-known examples of Japanese Imperial rescripts were Emperor Hirohito's 1945 Imperial Rescript on the Termination of the War written in response to the Potsdam Declaration and his 1946 Humanity Declaration written in response to a request by General Douglas MacArthur.

== Roman law ==
While the most common author of a rescript was nominally the emperor, the term referred generally to replies written by various officials from the local or provincial level to bishops in the religious hierarchy. During the high Roman Empire the emperor had an officer, the magister libellorum, to deal with petitions (Latin: libelli) from citizens and draft replies. Those replies, originally written at the bottom of the petition, are thought to have been written largely by the magister libellorum and only issued in the emperor's name. Due to the legal nature of many of those petitions and since the emperor served as a final court of appeal, the office was regularly held by jurists. Among these were Papinianus or Ulpian.

These rescripts, as written answers from the imperial chancery, came to have legislative effect and took on two general forms: letters (Latin: epistulae) and subscriptions (a response validated by the emperor's written signature underneath; Latin: subscriptiones). Some important early legal collections were composed largely of rescripts, for instance the Codices Gregorianus and Hermogenianus. Many imperial rescripts are preserved in the Justinian's Codex which restated the body of Roman law.

== Modern law ==
=== France ===
In France, people have the possibility to ask an administration for a rescrit (rescript), which means that they will present to the competent administration a circumstanced particular case, and obtain a formal answer (the rescrit) by the administration explaining how the law will be applied to the submitted particular case. The rescript is binding for the administration, and may be used before a court of law to exonerate the person who asked for the rescript in case of prosecution. In English common law such a hypothetical process is not allowed, and cases must be determined on fact.

=== Japan ===
Japanese Emperors have issued Rescripts, including the Hirohito surrender broadcast and the Humanity Declaration.

=== Imperial China ===
In imperial China, "rescript for most of Chinese history simply means imperial response, usually in the form of a comment on an incoming memorial, either sent back to the original sender or transmitted in the form of an instruction." Different terms have been used to refer to rescripts, including chìzhǐ (敕旨), zhàozhǐ (诏旨; 詔旨), or shèngzhǐ (圣旨; 聖旨). Palace memorials with the emperor's comments in red ink were called zhūpī zòuzhé (朱批奏折; 硃批奏摺; 'memorial to the throne (which is folded in concertina form) containing remarks written in vermilion').

=== Papacy ===
Papal rescripts concern the granting of favours or the administration of justice under canon law. In Roman Catholicism rescripts are responses in writing by the pope or a Congregation of the Roman Curia to queries or petitions of individuals.

=== United States ===
The Massachusetts appellate courts issue rescripts to the lower courts. These are the equivalent of mandates (i.e. writs of mandamus) in federal appellate practice.

== See also ==
- Imperial Rescript on Education
- Imperial Rescript to Soldiers and Sailors
- Imperial Rescript on the Termination of the War
- Declaratory Rescript of the Illyrian Nation

== Bibliography ==
- Connolly, Serena (2018). "rescripts". Oxford dictionary of late antiquity. Oxford University Press. ISBN 978-0-19-866277-8.
- Hoad, T F, ed. (1996). Concise Oxford dictionary of English etymology. Oxford University Press. ISBN 978-0-19-283098-2.
- Hornblower, Simon; et al., eds. (2012). The Oxford classical dictionary (4th ed.). Oxford University Press. ISBN 978-0-19-954556-8. OCLC 959667246.
  - Honoré, Tony. "magister libellorum". In OCD^{4} (2012). doi:10.1093/acrefore/9780199381135.013.3867
  - Nicholas, Barry. "constitutions". In OCD^{4} (2012). doi:10.1093/acrefore/9780199381135.013.1796
- Lewis, Charlton T; Short, Charles, eds. (1879). "rescribo". A Latin dictionary. Oxford: Clarendon Press.
- Wilkinson, Endymion Porter (2013). Chinese History: A New Manual. Harvard-Yenching Institute Monograph Series. Vol. 84. Cambridge (Massachusetts) and London: Harvard University Press. ISBN 978-0-674-06715-8.
