= Arthur Võõbus =

Estonian theologian, orientalist and church historian

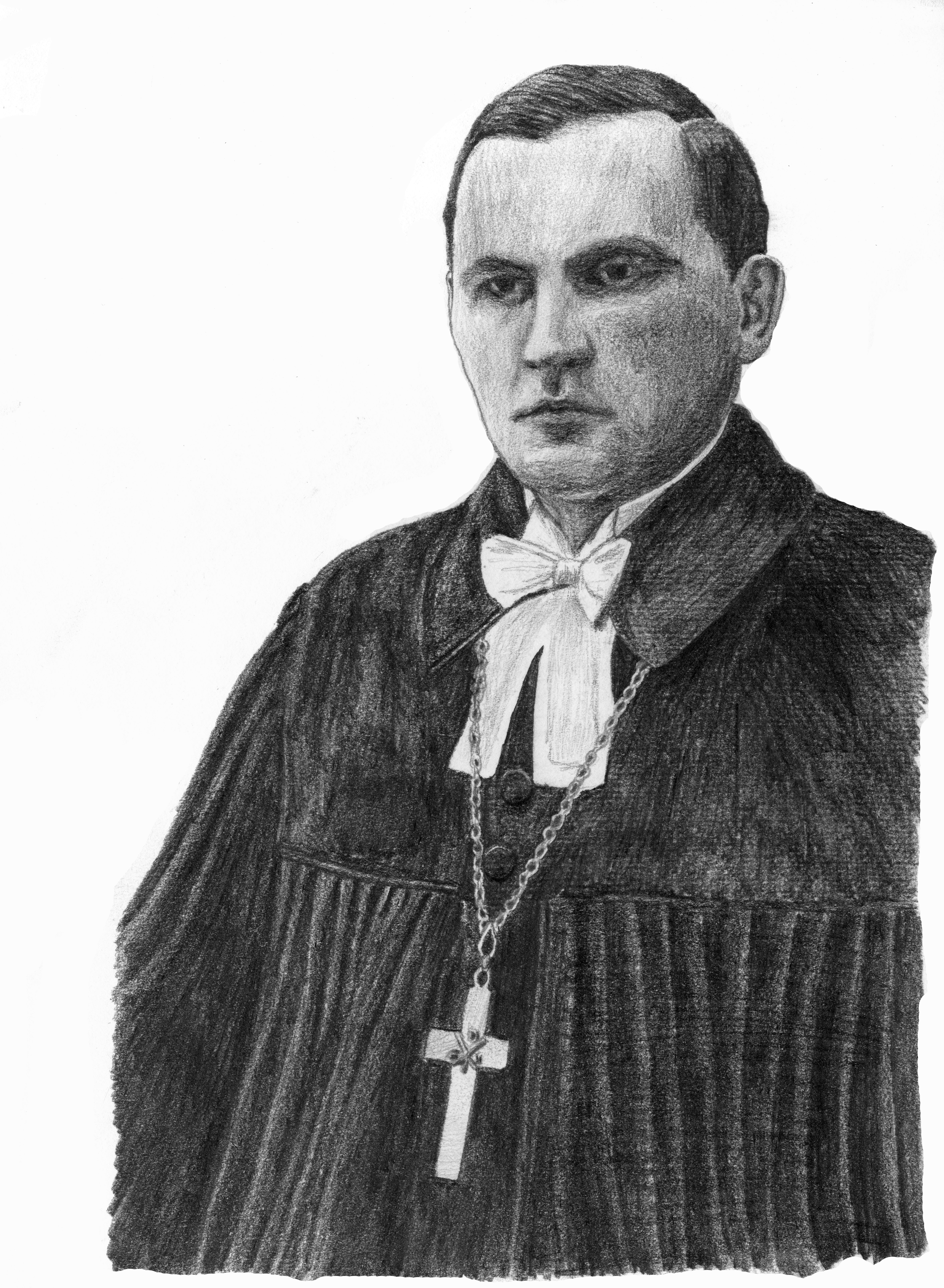
Arthur Võõbus, drawing

Arthur Võõbus (28 April [O.S. 15 April] 1909 – 25 September 1988) was an Estonian theologian, orientalist, scholar, author, professor, and church historian.

== Biography ==
Arthur Võõbus was born in the village of Matjama, Tartu County, Livonia, Russian Empire as the son of a teacher. In 1928, he completed his schooling at the Hugo Treffner Gymnasium in Tartu, then in 1932 his studies at the Theological Faculty of the University of Tartu. That same year he was ordained a priest. From 1933 to 1940 he was a pastor in the Estonian Evangelical Lutheran Church in Tartu. He graduated as master of theology in 1934 with a thesis on "The true Christian, true Christian life and the true Christian church by Soren Kirkegaard." In parallel, he worked in libraries and manuscript collections in Rome, Paris, London, Berlin and Leipzig on theological texts in Syriac. His language skills were acquired at the university under Uku Masing.

In 1936 he married Ilse Luksep, a daughter of a wealthy merchant family, which, along with his job in a large parish, provided the material basis for his research. Towards the end of the 1930s, Võõbus worked on the publication of Syriac texts. In 1940, he fled the Soviet occupation of Estonia to Germany. His dissident attitude led to observation by the Gestapo. After the occupation of Estonia by German troops he returned to Estonia. His doctoral thesis in 1943 at the University of Tartu was concerned with monasticism in Syria, Mesopotamia and Persia before the 10th Century.

In 1944, Võõbus and his family fled a second time before the Soviet reoccupation of Estonia. He spent part of the war interned in concentration camps. From 1944 to 1948 he worked as a pastor in refugee camps, and from 1946 to 1948 he was a professor of church history at the Baltic University at Pinneberg, near Hamburg. When this university was closed, he worked in London at the British Museum.

In 1948, Võõbus immigrated to the United States and became chair of the New Testament and ancient church history at the Lutheran School of Theology at Chicago (LSTC), where he taught from 1951 until his retirement in 1977. He was a member of several scientific academies, including the Royal Academy of Science, Letters and Fine Arts of Belgium. He died on 25 September 1988 in Oak, Park, Illinois, United States.

During his career, Võõbus made more than 40 separate trips to the Middle East, creating a collection of manuscript photographs on film that is larger than any other collection of Syriac manuscript images before the advent of digital imaging. This collection of manuscript images is now known as the Vööbus Syriac Manuscript Collection. In 1979, the collection moved from Võõbus's home in Chicago to the newly-founded Institute of Syriac Manuscript Studies (ISMS), located in the JKM Library at LSTC. The collection (then called the Professor Arthur Võõbus Collection of Syrian Manuscripts) was maintained at ISMS until 2016. In 2016, due to financial constraints, the ISMS entered into an agreement with the Hill Museum & Manuscript Library (HMML) and the entire collection was transferred and stored in HMML's microfilm vault. HMML now undertakes responsibility for the continued digitization of the films and the hosting of the images. In 2023, HMML made the scanned films available for viewing online at https://hmmlvoobus.org/.

== Works ==
- Communism's Challenge to Christianity (1950)
- Studies in the History of the Gospel Text in Syriac (Louvain: 1951)
- Early Versions of the New Testament Manuscript Studies: Oriental Texts and Facsimile Plates of Syriac, Armenian, Georgian, Coptic, Ethiopic and Arabic Manuscripts (Stockholm: 1954)
- “Liber Graduum: Some Aspects of its Significance for the History of Early Syriac Asceticism,” Charisteria Johanni Kopp Octogenario Oblata (Papers of the Estonian Theological Society in Exile, 7), pages 108–128 (Stockholm: 1954)
- The Communist Menace, the Present Chaos and Our Christian Responsibility (New York: 1957)
- History of Asceticism in the Syrian Orient: A Contribution to the History of Culture in the Near East, volumes 1–3 (Louvain: 1958, 1960, 1988)
- The Department of Theology at the University of Tartu: Its Life and Work, Martyrdom and Annihilation (Stockholm: 1963)
- Discoveries of Great Import on the Commentary on Luke by Cyril of Alexandria: The Emergence of New Manuscript Sources for the Syriac Version (1973)
- Important New Manuscript Sources for the Islamic Law in Syriac: Contributions to the History of Jurisprudence in the Syrian Orient. (1975)
- West Syrian Synodicon, CSCO 367–368/161–162; 375–376/163–164. (Louvain: 1975, 1976)
- “In Pursuit of Syriac Manuscripts,” Journal of Near Eastern Studies 37.2, Colloquium on Aramaic Studies (April 1978), pages 187–193.
- “On the Pathways of the Syrian Orient in the Pursuit of Manuscript Treasures,” The Professor Arthur Võõbus Collection of Syriac Manuscripts on Film and the Institute of Syriac Manuscript Studies, pages 2–20 (Chicago: 1982).
- The Martyrs of Estonia: The Suffering, Ordeal and Annihilation of the Churches under the Russian Occupation (Stockholm: ETSE, 1984)
- Studies in the History of the Estonian People, volumes 1–14
- Tragedy of the Estonian People, volumes 1–2

== Festschrift ==
- Robert H. Fischer (ed.), A Tribute to Arthur Võõbus: Studies in Early Christian Literature and Its Environment, Primarily in the Syrian East, Chicago: Lutheran School of Theology at Chicago, 1977.
