= Constitution (Roman law) =

Generic name for a legislative enactment by a Roman emperor

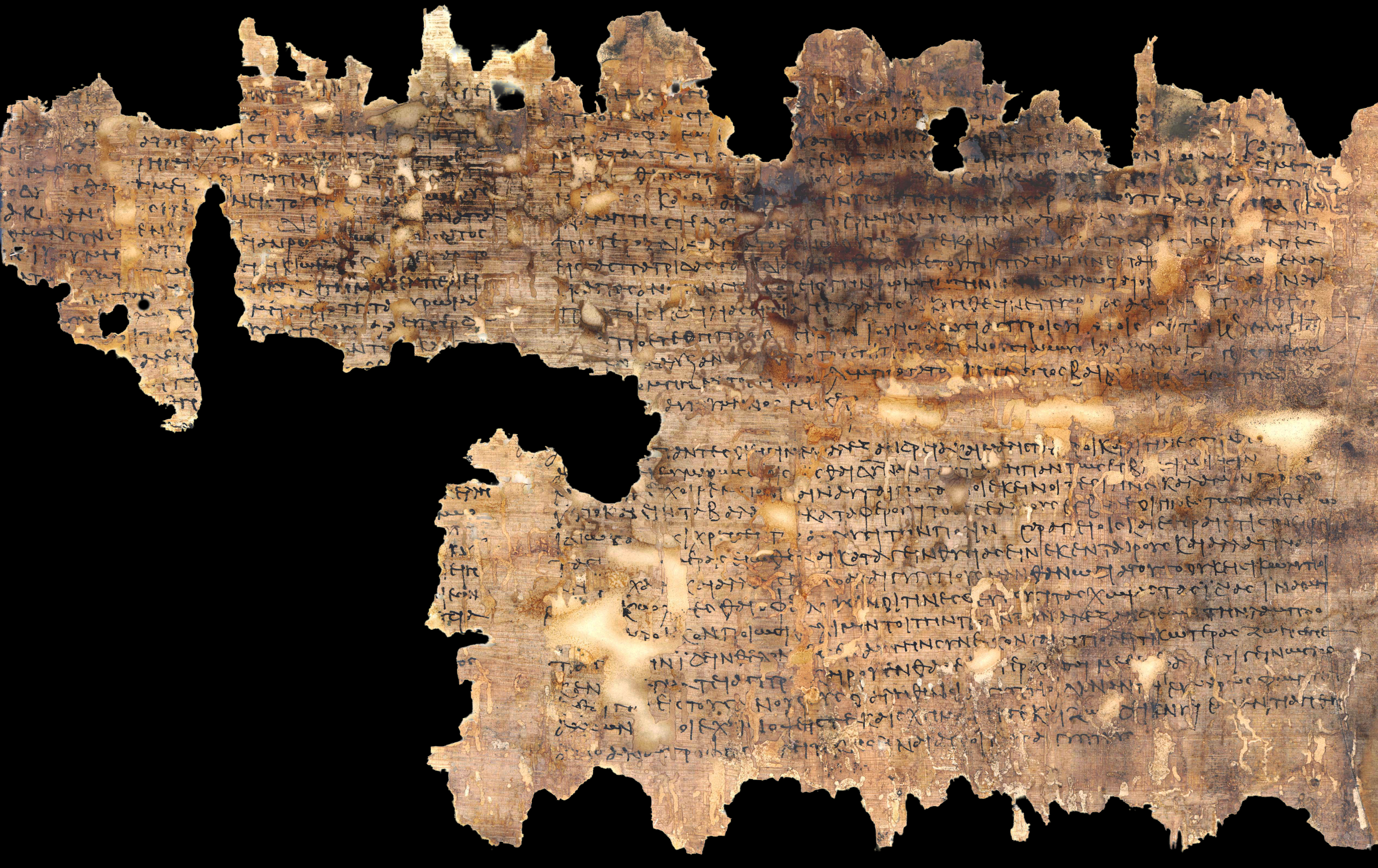
215 papyrus containing fragments of the Constitutio Antoniniana as well as three other edicts

In Roman law, a constitutio ("constitution") is any legislative enactment by a Roman emperor. It includes edicts, decrees (judicial decisions), and rescripta (written answers to officials or petitioners). Mandata (instructions) given by the Emperor to officials were not constitutions but created legal rules that could be relied upon by individuals.

One of the most important constitutions issued by a Roman emperor was Caracalla's Constitutio Antoniniana of 212, also called the Edict of Caracalla or the Antonine Constitution, which declared that all free men of the Roman Empire were to be given Roman citizenship and all free women the same rights as Roman women.
