= Lex Burgundionum =

Code of law of the Burgundians

The Lex Burgundionum (Latin for Burgundian Laws, also Lex Gundobada) is the law code of the Burgundians, probably issued by king Gundobad. It is influenced by Roman law and deals with domestic laws concerning marriage and inheritance as well as regulating weregild and other penalties. Interaction between Burgundians is treated separately from interaction between Burgundians and Gallo-Romans. The oldest of the 14 surviving manuscripts of the text dates to the 9th century, but the code's institution is ascribed to king Gundobad (died 516), with a possible revision by his successor Sigismund (died 523). The Lex Romana Burgundionum is a separate code, containing various laws taken from Roman sources, probably intended to apply to the Burgundians' Gallo-Roman subjects. The oldest copy of this text dates to the 7th century.

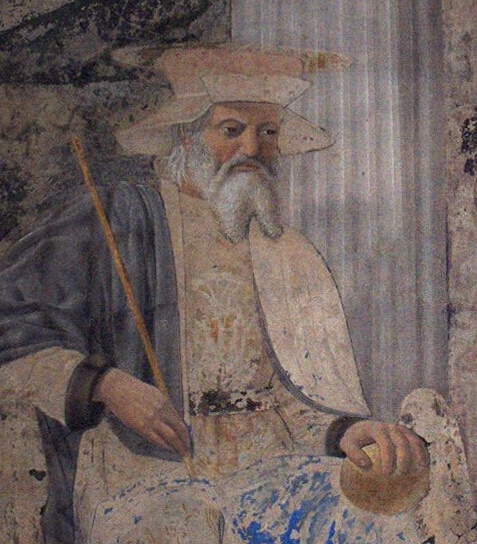
Portrait of Saint-King Sigismund of Burgundy.

The Lex Burgundionum code was compiled by King Gundobad (474-516). Some additamenta were subsequently introduced, either by Gundobad himself or by his son Sigismund. This law bears the title of Liber Constitutionum, indicating that it emanated from the king; it is also known as the Lex Gundobada or Lex Gombata. It was used for cases between Burgundians, and was also applicable to cases between Burgundians and Romans. For cases between Romans, however, Gundobad compiled the Lex Romana Burgundionum, called sometimes, through a misreading of the manuscript, the Liber Papiani, or simply Papianus.

== Background ==
The Burgundian kingdom is one of the early Germanic kingdoms that existed within the Roman Empire. In the late fifth and early sixth centuries, the Burgundian kings Flavius Gundobadus and Flavius Sigismundus compiled and codified laws to govern the members of their gens (tribe), as well as Romans living amongst them. Those laws governing the Burgundians themselves are called collectively the Lex Burgundionum, while the laws governing the Romans are known collectively as the Lex Romana Burgundionum. Both are extant. The laws codified in the Burgundian Code reflect the earliest fusion of German tribal culture with the Roman system of government. It promoted and helped maintain harmonious relations between such widely different people who had been previous enemies. More study has been given to other Germanic tribes of this time and little is known about the culture and way of life of the Burgundians beyond what can be inferred from their legal code. Katherine Fischer Drew claims that it is the most influential of all barbarian law codes because of its survival, even after Frankish conquest, until the ninth century.

The Romans consistently allied themselves with certain barbarian groups outside the Empire, playing them out against rival barbarian tribes as a policy of divide and rule, the barbarian allies being known as foederati (after the publication of the Constitutio Antoniniana, the foederati became Roman citizens). Sometimes these groups were allowed to live within the Empire. Barbarians could also be settled within the Empire as dediticii or laeti (who also became Roman citizens). The Romans could henceforth rely on these groups for military support or even as legionary recruits. One such group were the Burgundians, whom the Roman Emperor Honorius in 406 had invited to join the Roman Empire as foederati with a capital at Worms. The Burgundians were soon defeated by the Huns, but once again given land near Lake Geneva for Gundioc (r. 443-474) to establish a second federate kingdom within the Roman Empire in 443. This alliance was a contractual agreement between the two peoples. Gundioc's people were given one-third of Roman slaves and two-thirds of the land within Roman territory. The Burgundians were allowed to establish a kingdom within the Empire and received the nominal protection of Rome for their agreement to defend their territories from other outsiders. This contractual relationship between the guests, Burgundians, and hosts, Gallo-Romans, supposedly provided legal and social equality. However, Drew argues that the property rights and social status of the guests may have given them disproportionate leverage over their hosts. More recently, Henry Sumner Maine argues that the Burgundians exercised "tribe-sovereignty" rather than complete territorial sovereignty.

Gundioc's son, Gundobad (r. 474-516), began commission for his kingdom's legal codification in 483, which his son and successor, Sigismund (r. 516-532) completed. The laws deal mostly with inheritance and monetary compensation for physical injury. The earlier work, antiquae, and the later additions, novellae, together make the whole Burgundian Code. The Franks began attacking the Burgundians in 523 and completely defeated them by 534, when Sigismund's brother, Godomar (r. 532-534), fled and left the kingdom to be divided amongst Frankish rulers. However, the Franks kept Burgundian law in practice.

== Contents of the Lex ==
The Burgundian Code consists of two sets of laws, the earlier Book of Constitutions or Law of Gundobad, or Liber Constitutionum sive Lex Gundobada, and Additional Enactments, or Constitutiones Extravagantes. The laws of both parts are intended to govern the personal relations between individuals. The Law of Gundobad (Titles II-XLI) is a compilation of existing customary laws. These laws are mostly a codification of customs that had been accepted as law throughout the tribe through common practice. Drew describes Gundobad's work "as a recording of the customs of his people issued with the consent of the people". The later additions (Titles LXXXVIII-CV and Constitutiones Extravagantes), which are believed to have been issued primarily by Sigismund, are more rhetorical. They begin with general legal principles and dictate from the judgment of the king how a disputed situation may be handled.

It is this conflict between customary and statutory law that one sees the blending of Burgundian and Roman laws. Roman influence is apparent in the very act of writing down Germanic customary law. According to Edward Peters in his foreword to Drew's translation of the Burgundian Code, Roman ideals triumphed when King Gundobad began organizing his people's customary laws in order for their codification. King Gundobad's singular action to codify laws can also be seen as a major change in Germanic culture as reflecting the emergence of the king as supreme judge and lawmaker. The Burgundians already had traditions and laws for arbitrating disputes among its people, but Romans brought with them organizational structure for a more centralized government.

A great number of laws deal specifically with Germanic-style monetary retribution for intentional physical harm on one another. Punitive fines, rather than further physical injury or capital punishment, were used to regulate physical injury to prevent blood feud between two members of a tribal kinship. Along with money payments in compensation for physical injuries, the Burgundian Code also incorporates the wergeld, another Germanic institution. Drew defines wergelds as "the sum at which a man was valued and by the payment of which his death could be compensated". The wergeld of the upper class of freemen was worth a payment of 300 solidi, the underclass freeman worth 200 solidi, and the lowest class of freeman was 150 solidi. Drew believes that the family was the absolute most important social institution in Germanic tribes.

Additionally, its inheritance laws were based on Germanic custom. Land was passed down through a strict law of familial succession, which differs greatly from Roman laws on property that allow property to be acquired through ways other than hereditary inheritance, such as buying and selling or testimonial succession. Among other features, a widow was entitled to a life interest in a third of her husband's landed property: this may have been the prototype of the analogous institution of dower in early English law.

If a man betrothed a young woman and her parents later refused, they were liable to return four-fold the bride-price. But if she refused of her own accord, or if the wedding was not celebrated within two years, she could be re-engaged without penalty. If the man broke off the engagement, he got no refund. (§27)

The laws of the Burgundians show strong traces of Roman influence. It recognizes the will and attaches great importance to written deeds, but on the other hand, sanctions the judicial duel and the cojuratores (sworn witnesses). The vehement protest made in the 9th century by Agobard, bishop of Lyon, against the Lex Gundobada shows that it was still in use at that period. So late as the 10th and even the 11th centuries we find the law of the Burgundians invoked as personal law in Cluny charters, but doubtless these passages refer to accretions of local customs, rather than to actual paragraphs of the ancient code.

== See also ==
- Mund (in law)
