= Justinian I's administrative reforms =

Byzantine emperor Justinian I's reforms

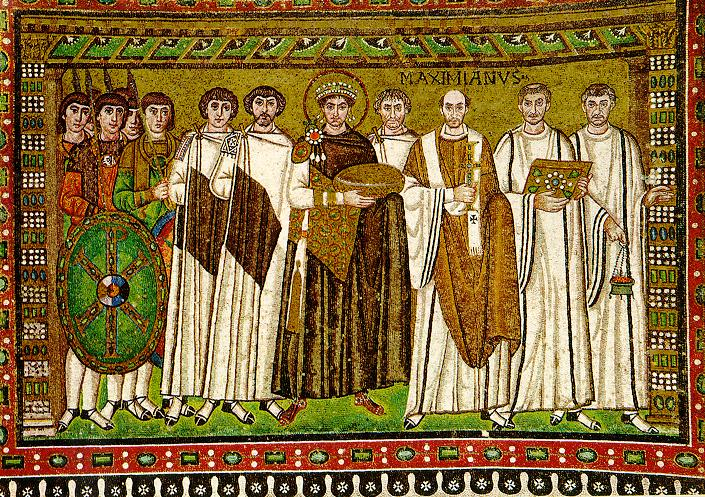
Justinian I with his courtiers. Mosaic of the church of San Vitale in Ravenna

Justinian I's administrative reforms were a series of measures carried out during the reign of the Byzantine emperor Justinian I (527–565) with the aim of unifying and improving the efficiency of the public administration of the Byzantine Empire. As a result of the reforms, provincial governors were able to make major administrative decisions without seeking approval from the emperor and his court. The main changes were implemented in 535–538 under the guidance and with the direct participation of Justinian himself and the Prefect of the East, John the Cappadocian. At the municipal level, Justinian's primary objective was to prevent the exodus of the curials, who preferred government service or a church career to the burdens and obligations of administering cities.

The power structure in Byzantium at the time of Justinian's accession was virtually identical to that which had existed in the second half of the 4th century under Emperor Valentinian I. Its primary function was the acquisition and distribution of the resources required for the functioning of the empire. Participation in the activities of the state apparatus involved not only officials whose positions were part of the official hierarchy, but also private individuals who received no payment from the state and were entrusted with the administration of cities, the management of imperial estates or the collection of taxes from them, the organisation of supplies for the army, or the management of public works.

Scholars place the administrative reforms of Justinian in a broad conceptual context, encompassing his conception of the sacred character of imperial power and the idea of the necessity of restoring the Roman Empire to its former boundaries through wars of conquest. Financing wars and large-scale building activity required considerable resources. In this respect, the system constructed by Justinian proved highly effective. Many historians note a variety of systemic problems during Justinian's reign, the most significant of which were corruption and the deterioration of local self-government. Despite considerable efforts, Justinian's reforms were unable to reverse the established trends. The Justinianic system of administration and tax collection remained largely unchanged until the early 7th century, when dramatic territorial losses and the corresponding reduction in revenues necessitated further reforms.

== Sources and historiography ==
A large number of sources provide information on the structure of the powerful institutions in the late Roman Empire and Byzantium. Chief among these are the legislative compilations of emperors Theodosius II (408–450) and Justinian. The Codex Theodosianus, published in 438, incorporated all legislation from the reign of Emperor Constantine the Great. Of its 16 books, four contain laws relating to military and civil administration, the duties of officials, their offices, and their privileges. Four further books concern taxation, and one book of the code is devoted to the administration of the capitals, Rome and Constantinople. Three of the 12 books of the Corpus Juris Civilis, which replaced the Theodosian compilation in 529, contain laws on public administration. Administrative matters are also frequently addressed in Justinian's Novels of various years. The picture of conditions in the empire offered by legislative sources is more symbolic than practical; historians believe it reflects the idealised mutual expectations of the subjects of state administration. Thus, the 192 laws of the Theodosian Code urging curials to remain in their cities and fulfil their proper duties are frequently cited as an example of the divergence between expectations and reality.

Late Antiquity is an exceptionally difficult period for the construction of lists of provincial officials, owing to the substantial reduction in epigraphic material compared with the preceding period; those inscriptions that have survived are difficult to analyse because of their laconic character. Lists of provinces are reconstructed on the basis of a small number of documents such as the Laterculus Veronensis of the early 4th century, the Notitia Dignitatum, which A. H. M. Jones dates to the early years following the division of the Roman Empire in 395, certain of Justinian's novels, and the geographical treatise Synecdemus by Hierocles. Of these, the Notitia Dignitatum is considered the most important, as it describes the system of military and civil offices. The information provided by Hierocles relates primarily to cities founded no later than the mid-5th century. The treatise may have taken its final form in the early years of Justinian's reign, since it makes no mention of the province of Theodorias, created in 528.

Works by authors who held official positions or were close to the court are of considerable importance. These include the writings of Cassiodorus, who held the post of praetorian prefect of Italy before the conquest of the Ostrogothic kingdom, the official and unofficial works of Procopius of Caesarea, and the panegyrics of Paul the Silentiary. Exceptionally informative is the treatise On the Magistracies by John Lydus, who held high offices. Other works of early Byzantine historiography are also useful, as their authors were generally members of the upper strata of society. Finally, historians obtain information about the lower levels of administration from epistolary collections, collections of ecclesiastical documents (such as the Collectio Avellana), and, for Byzantine Egypt and Palestine, from papyrus archives. Of the latter, the bilingual, Greek and Coptic, archive of Dioscorus of Aphrodito, a 6th-century Egyptian landowner, official, and jurist, is of interest for the study of provincial officialdom. Dioscorus used his literary talents to obtain from the governor and the prefect decisions favourable to his family.

As the German Byzantinist Berthold Rubin notes, it matters little how one evaluates the degree of novelty of Justinian's reforms, since they continued pre-existing trends in any case. Several approaches exist in the historiography to describing the social and economic development of Byzantium under Justinian. One of them places particular emphasis on social conflicts: a lot of them occurred precisely during the period under consideration. Scholars find grounds for this approach both in Justinian's legislation, where his desire to set himself in opposition to corrupt officials is frequently apparent, and in narrative sources that are sharply critical of the emperor's reform initiatives. A problem with "materialist" interpretations is the questionable extrapolation of unevenly distributed economic or archaeological data to the empire as a whole. The theory advanced by the British Byzantinist Peter Sarris, based on an analysis of data from Egyptian great estates, concerning the "bankruptcy" and "semi-privatisation" of the state under Justinian has been criticised both for its general conclusions and for its debatable interpretations of Egyptian realities. Since the 1990s, greater attention has been paid to cultural and ideological aspects, with an emphasis on cooperation rather than conflict between the emperor and the aristocracy. The American Byzantinist Michael Maas, in his articles and in a monograph devoted to the views of John Lydus, treats the reforms as a manifestation of an ideology reflecting the tension between Christianity and classicism.

Numerous conceptual frameworks have been proposed for understanding the logic of institutional development in the late Roman Empire and Byzantium. In the view of the Australian historian Christopher Kelly, behind the outwardly strange and inconsistent administrative decisions of the emperors lay a desire to prevent the bureaucratic machine from developing into a force governed by its own laws rather than the will of the monarch. Emperors thus consciously sacrificed administrative efficiency in order to preserve their power, chaotically appointing people to positions and reorganising power structures. Many scholars draw attention to the state of the empire's institutional structures as a cause of its administrative difficulties. A. H. M. Jones and Ernst Stein paid particular attention to the complex legal problems arising from the position of governors within the power structure and the procedure for appeals. The Canadian historian James Evans regarded administrative errors as a systemic phenomenon, the result of the administrative system serving its own interests. In his view, under Justinian Parkinson's laws applied not only to the civil service but to the church as well. Corruption in provincial administrations and the decline of the institution of governors are also cited as sources of difficulty. Yet another approach identifies the origins of systemic problems in social or class dynamics. The British historian Wolf Liebeschuetz sees the origins of the Byzantine decline of the "Dark Ages" and the successes of the Arab conquests in the decline of the curial class and the transfer of power in the cities from a hereditary aristocracy with a vested interest in the development of their native city to relatively itinerant "notables" who had accumulated their wealth through government service.

== The administrative system at the beginning of the 6th century ==
=== The emperor ===
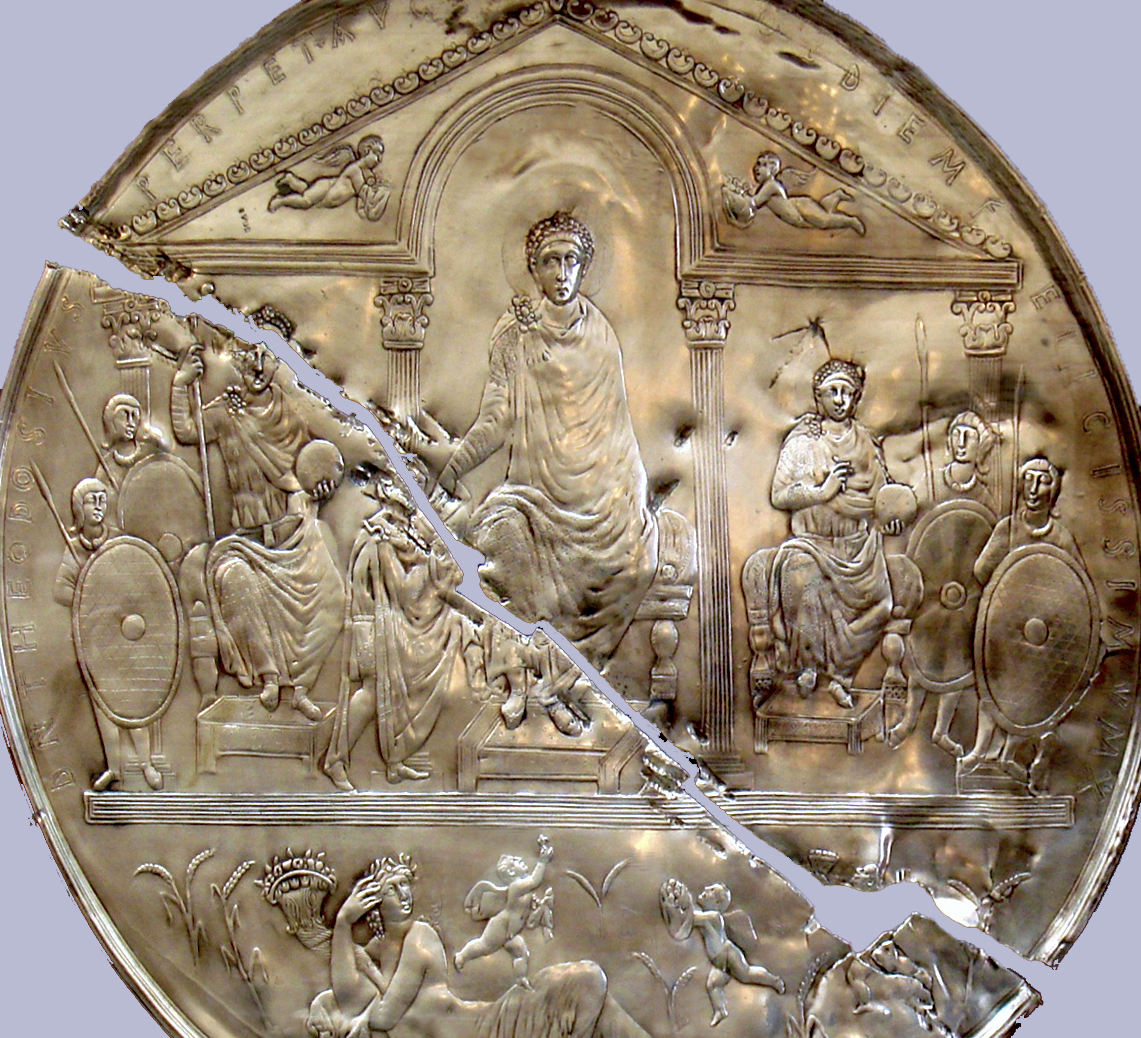
The emperor surrounded by courtiers on the Missorium of Theodosius I, c. 388

During Justinian's reign, the process by which imperial power acquired sacred characteristics accelerated. In Novel 105, he asserts that "God has subjected the very laws to the emperor, sending him to mankind as a living law". Officials were now directly linked to the person of the emperor, being designated in their titles as "Justinianic" praetors, proconsuls, moderators, and so forth. Believing in the divine origin of his authority, Justinian insisted on the word κύριος ("lord") as the form of address directed towards him. Justinian ruled "by the grace of God" and was the first to introduce the title "Christ-loving." Victorious victory titles were also used more frequently during his reign.

In February 528, Justinian appointed a commission to create a new code of laws. All obsolete laws were repealed and the number of remaining ones substantially reduced. The Code was published on 7 April 529. In December of the following year, a new commission was appointed to work on the writings of the ancient jurists, from which all substantial passages were to be extracted. The resulting Digest was published on 16 December 533. Somewhat earlier, the Institutes had been issued, intended to serve as a textbook for future lawyers. Scholars consider that Justinian's legislative activity should be viewed in conjunction with his wars of conquest and religious initiatives, all broadly directed towards the reintegration of the Roman world. It is no coincidence that in September 533 came the decisive victory over the Vandals, and in November the Theopaschite edict was republished.

Imperial Majesty should not only be glorified by arms, but also by armed with laws, so that good government may prevail in time of peace as well as in time of war. The head of the Roman state should then triumph not only over enemies in war, but also over troublemakers, driving out their wickedness by the paths of the law, and be found as religious a champion of justice as he is a conqueror of vanquished enemies.

The second edition of the Code was published on 16 November 534. New legislation, including that relating to the administrative reforms, was created in the form of Novels. The principal work on this extensive legislative activity was performed by Tribonian, quaestor of the Sacred Palace and magister officiorum from 529 until his death in the early 540s. Justinian's direct contribution to the drafting of the laws is considered by scholars to have been slight. Although Greek was not Justinian's native language, it was under him that Latin definitively lost its position as the language of legislation and administration. In the emperor's view, the intelligibility to all of words written in "the everyday language" was more important than adherence to "the language of the ancestors." It was also intended that this would simultaneously increase the transparency of bureaucratic procedures and raise their efficiency; however, in the view of John Lydus, the opposite effect was achieved, since the lowering of educational standards gave John the Cappadocian the opportunity to place his incompetent protégés in key positions. Tony Honoré, the author of a monograph devoted to Tribonian, dated the shift in the language of legislation to the beginning of 535, which raises the question of the significance of the Roman titles used in the series of "provincial" Novels of the late 530s.

A paramount priority for Justinian was the exercise of control over the religious life of his subjects, which was reflected in his conception of imperial authority. Among his first acts as emperor was the enactment of laws against heretics, pagans, Jews, and homosexuals. In 532, Justinian undertook a series of measures to restore the unity of the church, which had been lost after the Council of Chalcedon, and the war against the Vandals he launched in 533 was presented by him as a struggle against Arian heresy. In 535, in Novel 6 addressed to Patriarch Epiphanius, he formulated his vision of the relationship between imperial power (imperium) and the priesthood (sacerdotium):

One of the greatest God's gifts to mankind, granted from on high out of divine benevolence, are the priesthood and the empire. The former serves divine matters; the latter presides over and oversees human affairs. Both proceed from one and the same source and together harmoniously order human life — and nothing is so important for emperors as the honour of priests, who unceasingly pray to God on their behalf. For if the former is wholly blameless and enjoys God's favour, and the latter governs justly and properly the state entrusted to it, there will arise a certain good harmony, which will provide all possible benefits for the human race.

Thus Justinian was the first to articulate the principle of "symphony"—the harmonious cooperation of secular and spiritual powers.

=== The central apparatus ===
Historians trace the origins of the central governmental apparatus of the Byzantine Empire to the existence of a group of special officials —comites— who accompanied the emperor in his movements throughout the empire. Until the death of Emperor Theodosius I (379–395), the emperor frequently led the field army in person and the comitatus followed him, as can be seen from references in legislative acts. After 395, the emperors of the Eastern Empire resided almost permanently in Constantinople, rarely venturing further than the nearest provinces. From the time of Emperor Constantine the Great (306–337), the comitatus included the administrators of the imperial household (sacrum cubiculum) with a staff of eunuch cubicularii and silentiarii, scholarian guards, secretary-notaries, officials holding the rank of comes and quaestors. This group also included one of the praetorian prefects and two military masters (of cavalry and infantry) with their offices. The most important of the court positions was that of magister officiorum, to whom were subordinated such services as the imperial chancery (sacra scrinia), the weapons workshops, and the scholae of the imperial guard. The extent to which the magister officiorum actually controlled these important services is, however, unclear. The influence of the magister officiorum stemmed from his proximity to the emperor: he organised audiences, provided interpreters for foreign ambassadors, and oversaw the couriers and spies.

An independently significant position among the court bureaucracy was held by the record-keepers (notaries, tabularii, referendarii) headed by the primicerius. Their duties included managing the documentary flow of the consistory and transmitting petitions to the emperor. The office of quaestor of the Sacred Palace, established under Constantine the Great, had no particularly defined functions and likewise involved work on legislation. Unlike other senior officials, quaestors had no staff of their own, but under Justinian two of the four legal departments of the magister officiorum —the scrinium epistolarum and the scrinium libellorum— were subordinated to the quaestor Tribonian.

The prefectures, through their subordinate structures, were also responsible for the state postal service, the security of arms depots and workshops, and the general organisation of public works. The latter included the maintenance of roads, bridges, and granaries, and were delegated to the relevant craftsmen at the local level. John Lydus, who served for more than 40 years in the legal department of the Praetorian Prefecture of the East, considered the office of magister officiorum less significant and less honourable. He attributed the decline of the praetorian magistrature—whose origins he traced to the times of Romulus—to the activities of John the Cappadocian, who headed it for two terms between 532 and 541. It was the latter whom the eminent Byzantinist A. H. M. Jones identifies as the inspiration behind Justinian's administrative reforms. John Lydus provides numerous technical details and nuances of his service, of which he was extremely proud. From antiquity, the staff of the praetorian prefecture were enrolled in the Legio I Adiutrix (legio I adiutrix), and as late as the 6th century bureaucratic terminology retained a military character: officials wore uniforms, and the head of the prefect's office, the princeps officii, carried a centurion's staff as a mark of distinction. The officials of the prefecture were distributed among legal and financial scrinia (scrinium). Of the financial scrinia, one dealt with tax matters, others with the accounting of administrative expenditure in the dioceses and payments for public needs. Some departments did not hold the status of a scrinium, such as the department created under Justinian to oversee the supply of grain to Constantinople. The apparatus of the diocesan vicars was organised along similar principles.

=== Civil and military authority in the provinces ===
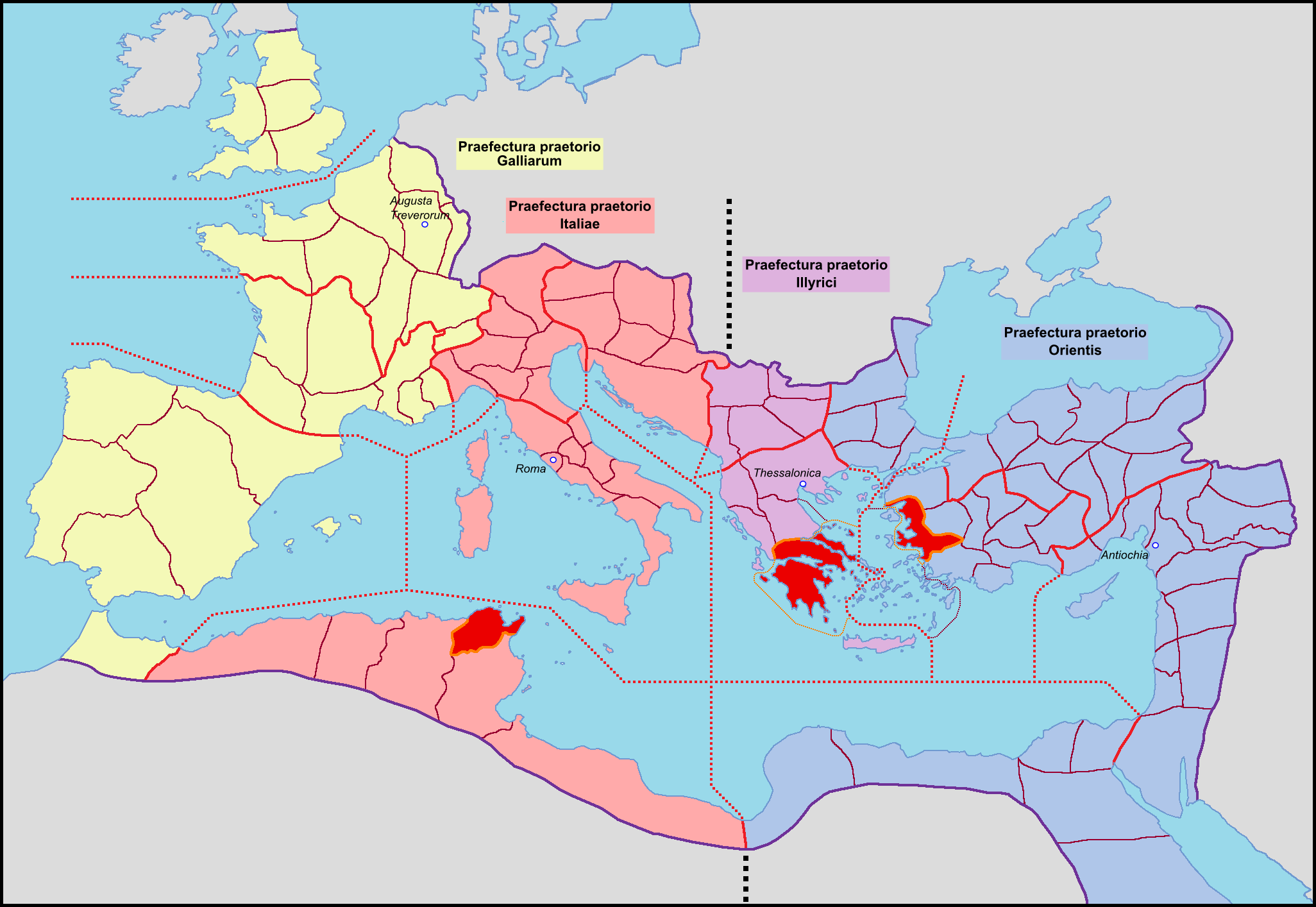
Administrative divisions of the Roman Empire according to the Notitia Dignitatum, c. 400 AD.

The power structure laid down by Diocletian (284–305) and developed by Constantine the Great rested on three principles: the separation of military administration from civil, a hierarchical structure, and a tendency to divide large provinces into smaller ones. Several provinces formed a diocese headed by a vicar. The empire as a whole contained around one hundred provinces distributed among twelve dioceses and four praetorian prefectures. The theme system, by contrast, concentrated authority in enlarged provinces in the hands of a single individual directly subordinate to the central government. Although the system that had evolved in the 4th and 5th centuries was not decisively abolished under Justinian, the principles of Diocletian and Constantine were consistently violated. Both practical necessity and the tendency of powerful commanders to interfere in economic matters made it impossible to maintain a strict separation of military and civil administration. During Justinian's reign there were also instances of the reverse — the sakellarios Rusticus took an active part as one of the commanding generals during the Lazic War, Belisarius's treasurer John the Armenian likewise performed the duties of a military commander, and the eunuch Narses headed the financial department before his appointment as commander in Italy.

It is not known what provincial divisions Justinian inherited from his predecessors. It is assumed that they did not differ greatly from those that had emerged by the end of the 4th century. The principal sources for reconstruction are the list of offices in the Notitia Dignitatum, which enumerates the eastern provinces of the Roman Empire as of around 394 AD, and the geographical treatise Synecdemus, containing a statistical description of 64 Byzantine provinces and the cities within them. In addition, epigraphic sources provide information on the titles and offices of provincial officials.

The system of civil offices was quite complex. A vicar, who ranked higher than a provincial governor, yielded in precedence to a proconsul, who also headed a single province. This division had republican origins, when vicars were appointed from the equestrian class and proconsuls from the senatorial class. After Diocletian's reforms, governors held only civil authority and were required to coordinate their efforts with the regional military commander, the dux. Four titles were available to governors: praeses, corrector, consularis, and proconsul. Of the 116 provinces known from the Notitia Dignitatum, the majority were governed by praesides. Correctors, whose title derives from the Latin: legati Augusti ad corrigendum statum of the early 2nd century, headed provinces in Italy. Consulares were originally former consuls, but from the 3rd century onward the title was applied to certain governors who had not necessarily previously held consular office. Proconsuls were governors in Africa, Asia, and Greece. In addition to the official titles, four general designations for governors also existed — praesides, rectores (rector), moderatores (moderator), and iudex ordinarius — used primarily in a legal context. Alongside the Latin terminology there was also a Greek equivalent: Ancient Greek: ἄρχων for a governor in general, Ancient Greek: ὕπατικός for a consularis, and Ancient Greek: ἀνθύπατος for a proconsul. There appears to have been no official rule governing promotion through the offices. A governor's social standing depended on his title and was expressed by one of the honorific epithets. Senators bore the title clarissimus, while equestrians could hold perfectissimus, egregius, and eminentissimus, the last of which was reserved exclusively for praetorian prefects. In the 3rd century, emperors preferred equestrians when making appointments, particularly to military posts, as a result of which the number of senatorial offices declined. After the reign of Constantine the Great the trend reversed, and equestrians lost their influence. A new Senate was founded in Constantinople, and its members also received appointments as praesides and prefects. At the same time, new offices were created for senators by elevating the status of certain provinces, which led to a revival of their order's influence.

Anyone who had received a sufficient education could pay to purchase an office (Note: The rules governing the purchase of offices were established by a law of Theodosius II in 444.) sufficient to begin a career in one of the state positions. Whereas in the 4th century an educated person was considered to be one who had attended a course of rhetoric under a renowned sophist, by the 6th century a legal education had come to be regarded as prestigious. It did not in itself guarantee appointment to an office, and young lawyers were initially placed on the list of supernumerarii while awaiting a suitable vacancy. A legal career could thereafter develop, bringing social standing and prosperity, but for many students of law the most attractive prospect was entry into the bureaucratic aristocracy. Advocates could obtain certain posts through seniority, or, by transferring to the position of assessor to a magistrate, rise to the post of governor or even praetorian prefect. Advancement could be accelerated by good fortune, as was the case with John the Lydian, but exceptional ability could also play its part, as with Justinian's prominent courtiers John of Cappadocia and Peter Barsymes.

=== Tax collection and finances ===
According to the eminent Byzantinist J. Haldon, the primary functions of the constantly evolving state apparatus were the identification, collection, and distribution of tax resources. This function was carried out at various levels, from the lowest territorial units up to the provinces, dioceses, and praetorian prefectures. By the beginning of the 6th century, following the territorial losses of the 4th and 5th centuries, only two prefectures remained: the Prefecture of the East, centred in Constantinople, and the Prefecture of Illyricum, centred in Thessaloniki. During Justinian's reign the Prefecture of Italy, centred in Ravenna, and the Prefecture of Africa, with its capital at Carthage, were restored. They were structurally similar to one another, although the Prefecture of the East had certain distinctive features by virtue of including the capital. The hierarchy of tax institutions followed the hierarchy of the territorial organs of government. The amount of taxes to be collected varied according to the external political situation and the internal needs of each territorial unit. The Byzantine tax system under Justinian broadly followed that established under Diocletian, known as iugatio-capitatio, a combination of a land tax with a poll tax. The government issued annually in July or August a list of the expected tax revenues from each iugerum. Tax rates were set according to existing cadastral records, and no new tax rolls were compiled under Justinian. An exception was the reconquered North Africa, where, as Procopius of Caesarea reports, the Vandals had destroyed the documentation, and special officials had to be sent "to assess the taxes upon each man according to his ability". Procopius mentions certain tax innovations introduced by Justinian, but these appear not to have been fundamental in character. The main features of his tax policy were the refusal to write off arrears, the assignment of the functions of recording taxable property and collecting taxes to officials, and a general improvement in the efficiency of the tax system.

The Byzantinian financial institutions' structure began to take shape as far back as the era of the Principate. Responsibilities were divided among the offices of the praetorian prefect, the sacrae largitiones, and the res privata. The latter two institutions were headed by members of the Senate holding the rank of illustris and the title of comes. The sacrae largitiones comprised the public property under imperial control. The Count of the Sacred Largesses (comes sacrarum largitionum) was responsible for collecting revenues in the form of cash, precious and semi-precious metals, and textiles. Beginning with the reign of Septimius Severus, the administration of the emperor's personal property and property confiscated for his benefit passed to the res privata. The complex structure of imperial property accumulated over centuries required an equally complex administrative apparatus to manage the res privata, headed by the Count of the Privy Purse. Under Leo I (457–474) and Zeno (474–491), the character of the res privata as the emperor's personal property was emphasised by a division between the property of the emperor and that of the empress. Anastasius I (491–518) abolished the division, transferring a portion of the revenues from the res privata to public needs. A large number of officials were involved in tax collection, but the sources do not give a comprehensive picture of the distribution of their powers. The Count of the Sacred Largesses had ten scrinium (subdivisions) subordinate to him, corresponding to each of the dioceses. Separate scrinia existed for managing the affairs of Constantinople and certain strategically important sectors of the economy. The staff of the Count of the Privy Purse was more modest, divided into five scrinia managing the imperial estates (domus divinae) in the provinces. A trend that had begun in the early 5th century and continued under Justinian was the loss of control by the res privata over the domus divinae. The decline of the res privata and the sacrae largitiones was further hastened by the conversion of taxes in kind into monetary payments (adaeratio). As a consequence, the role of the praetorian prefecture grew, as it controlled more financial resources than the other departments. The logothetes were financial officials personally subordinate to the emperor. The economic mechanisms behind adaeratio prompted further changes in the financial administration of the empire.

The collection of taxes at the provincial level was the responsibility of the governor, who received the amount of monetary taxes required (largitiones tituli) from the office of the Count of the Sacred Largesses, and taxes in kind from the tax office of the praetorian prefect (fiscalis arca). For the collection of each type of tax the governor had a dedicated group of officials, tabularii and numerarii respectively. Once the governor had received notification of the tax amount fixed for the given year, his subordinates distributed the sum among the individual territorial communities.

== Provincial administration ==
=== General principles ===
Justinian's administrative reforms were initiated by the promulgation of Novel 8 on April 15, 535. Michael Maas counts among the preparatory legislation Novel 23, published in January of the same year, which regularised the procedure for appeals in the provinces. The "provincial" novels that followed over the next several years were unusual both in form and in content. Most of the novels relating to administrative reform are furnished with a preamble placing the changes in the relevant province in their historical context. Drawing on historical analogies and the specific character of each province's ties with Rome, Justinian justified the mode of governance appropriate to it, with its own titles and levels of remuneration. The hierarchy that resulted did not replicate any previously existing arrangement in Roman history. In the view of a number of scholars, through his "antiquarian" reminiscences Justinian sought to render his reforms more acceptable to that portion of Byzantine society that was nostalgic for the Roman past.

One of the principal aims of Justinian's administrative reform was the eradication of abuses in appointments to civil and military offices. The "suffragium system" underlying the empire's personnel policy resolved the problem of filling minor posts in which the emperor had neither the ability nor the desire to intervene personally. The system had existed since the time of the Roman Republic, when a suffragium (Latin: suffragium) referred to a vote cast in favour of a candidate for office. Historians differ considerably on the precise nature of the suffragium in subsequent centuries, but it is broadly certain that by the 4th century suffragatores — that is, those who provided recommendations — rendered their services for payment. Emperors Constantius II and Julian the Apostate enacted laws stipulating that junior military posts could be awarded only on the basis of personal merit. Later, the practice of suffragium was acknowledged as a necessary evil and was in effect legalised by a law of Theodosius II in 438. During the reign of Emperor Zeno (474–491), the sale and resale of offices for the enrichment of the emperor and his closest courtiers was practised with particular frequency. By the beginning of Justinian's reign the situation had apparently become so critical that by his Novel 8 he banned the suffragium system entirely and required every governor or vicar taking up office to swear in the name of the Father, the Son, the four Gospels, the Virgin Mary, and the archangels that he had not obtained his post through bribery. According to the Secret History written by the court historian Procopius of Caesarea, this prohibition did not last long, and within a year Justinian himself was engaged in the sale of offices. In most cases the payments went to the imperial treasury and might then be assigned as additional remuneration to the praetorian prefects or other senior officials. In other cases the payments went to the predecessor or superior of the official being appointed, as compensation for the loss of revenue from the province that he thereby incurred.

Almost all provinces were also divided into two categories: consular and presidial. The fee for posts in the consular provinces was higher. These measures were directed against the strict hierarchism that had allowed the suffragium system to flourish, whereby praetorian prefects purchased offices from the emperor, vicars from the prefects, provincial governors from the vicars, and provincial governors in turn sold the posts of their deputies. The system was thus shortened by one tier. Governors were provided with a set of standard instructions (Latin: mandata), and in counterbalance the office of "defender of the city" (Latin: defensor civitatis) was reformed and strengthened. Defensores were entrusted with the hearing of all disputes involving sums of less than 300 solidus, thereby relieving provincial inhabitants of the need to bear the high costs of minor cases before the governor's court. Some governors were elevated in rank from clarissimus to spectabilis, and appeals against their judicial decisions were henceforth to be heard not by the Prefect of the East in person but by a tribunal composed of the prefect and the quaestor of the sacred palace. In the new system the vicariates appear to have formed a superfluous intermediate level of authority performing no essential functions. In the view of A. Jones, in the East they had already lost their significance in the 5th century. In the course of the reform several of the vicariates were abolished.

=== Provincial administration reform ===
Through a series of novellae issued between 535 and 539, Justinian reformed the administrative governance of several provinces. As American Byzantinist Michael Maas notes, this followed the completion of the codification of law, a process that had made the emperor, rather than jurists, the source of law. The first territories to be reorganized were those adjacent to the capital. The military and civil vicariates associated with the Long Walls were merged into a single praetorship of Thrace, on the reasoning that the perpetual rivalry between two officials had left this strategically important structure without proper administration. In 536 a new office was created, the quaestura exercitus, which took over the supply of troops on the Thracian frontier. In practice, the quaestor exercitus functioned as an independent praetorian prefect, assigned five provinces detached from the Prefecture of the East: Moesia II, Scythia,Insulae, Caria, and Cyprus. The latter two served as supply sources for the troops stationed in Scythia. The original text of Novella 41 has not survived, and the motives behind the creation of this unusual office, as well as the new quaestor's precise powers, therefore remain unclear. While scholars generally regard the quaestura exercitus as a measure to strengthen frontier defence in the Danubian provinces, the inclusion of Mediterranean provinces has been interpreted in various ways. J. B. Bury suggested (1931) that Justinian wished to offset the costs of Moesia and Scythia, impoverished by barbarian incursions, by linking them to the wealthier southern provinces. Ernst Stein viewed the reorganisation as purely military in motivation (1949), noting the maritime character of the provinces assigned to the quaestor: Cyprus possessed major shipyards, while Caria and the Islands were known for their seafarers. Velizar Velkov's proposal connecting the reform to Justinian's extensive building activity in the lower Danube region (1956), along with other theories, has not gained wide acceptance.

Province	Document	Date
Pisidia	Novella 24	18 May 535
Lycaonia	Novella 25	18 May 535
Thrace	Novella 26	18 May 535
Isauria	Novella 27	18 May 535
Helenopont	Novella 28	16 July 535
Paphlagonia	Novella 29	16 July 535
Cappadocia	Novella 30	18 March 536
Armenia	Novella 31	18 March 536
Caria, Cyprus, Cyclades, Moesia, Scythia	Novella 41	18 May 536
Arabia	Novella 102	27 May 536
Phoenicia	Edict 4	27 May 536
Palestine	Novella 103	July 536
Egypt	Edict 13	538/9

If the first phase of the reforms, several new posts were created in Constantinople. In 535, the city prefect of Constantinople received a new office, being transformed from praefectus vigilum into praetor of the demes (praetor populi). The annual salary of the new official was set at 720 solidus, to be distributed between the praetor himself and his assessors. Four years later the city received an official of quaestor rank, whose duties included oversight of the territory and population, keeping vagrants out of the capital, and ensuring the inhabitants had employment. He was assigned the same salary as the praetor, but the remuneration of his subordinates was fixed separately: 100 solidus for the consiliarius and 330 solidus for the remaining ministrants.

In 535–536, the structure of the dioceses of Asia, Pontus, and the East underwent significant changes. The provinces of Cappadocia and Pontus, previously divided into two parts each, were reunified. At the same time the post of head of the private financial administration (comes domorum), formerly subordinate to the praepositus of the sacred bedchamber, was transferred to the governor of Cappadocia with the rank of proconsul and an increased salary of 1,440 solidus. The vicariates in the dioceses of Pontus and Asia were abolished, and the pay of the vicars was added to that of the governors of Phrygia, Pacatiana, and Galatia Prima. These governors received the title of comites and were entrusted with both civil and military authority in their provinces. The provinces of Paphlagonia and Honorias were merged, and Helenopontus was united with Pontus Polemoniacus under the common "Christian" name of Helenopontus, so as not to perpetuate the name of the tyrant. Their governors received the titles of praetor and moderator respectively, and their authority likewise extended to both civil and military affairs. Officials of the merged provinces were assigned the combined salaries of the former governors: 725 solidus for the praetor and moderator, 72 solidus for the legal adviser (assessor), and 447⅓ solidus for the entire chancellery of 100 staff. Pisidia and Lycaonia were placed under praetors, to whom were transferred the military powers of the comites and the civil powers of the governors. These praetors received higher salaries (800 solidus for the praetor, 72 for the assessor, 360 for the chancellery). In Cappadocia Prima the offices were likewise merged in the person of a proconsul. Some of the changes proved unsuccessful and were reversed shortly after the deposition of John of Cappadocia in 541. The abolition of the vicariates in Asia Minor, for instance, led to a rise in banditry, and in Thrace the vicars were restored on account of the insufficient effectiveness of the praetors.

In 535, the governors of Arabia and Phoenicia Libanensis received the title of moderator with increased salaries (1,080 and 720 solidus respectively). The following year the head of Palaestina Prima received the rank of proconsul with a salary of 1,584 solidus, which he was to distribute among his consulares and chancellery staff at his own discretion. Byzantine Armenia was completely reorganised. Greater Armenia was enlarged by the addition of three cities from Armenia Prima and two cities from Pontus Polemoniacus, and a proconsul was placed at its head. Armenia Prima, for its part, received one city each from Pontus and Helenopontus, and was itself renamed Armenia Second. The former Armenia Second was renamed Armenia Third and placed under a comes endowed with military authority. Finally, Armenia Fourth was formed from a satrapy. In the Diocese of the East the changes affected only the officials: the post of comes of the East was abolished, and its remuneration was transferred to the consularis of Syria Prima. The posts of the military comes and the civil governor of Isauria, previously separated, were merged. On the basis of the Asian and Arabian novels, the French scholar of antiquity Maurice Sartre points to the absence of any revolutionary character in Justinian's reorganisation. According to epigraphic sources, for instance, the office of vicar of Asia had existed previously but had remained vacant in the 5th and early 6th centuries, with its functions performed by one of the provincial governors. Similarly, Novel 102 merely sanctioned a redistribution of authority that had already taken shape in practice in Arabia.

The year in which Egypt was reformed is known only to within an indiction, and may be either 538/539, the date to which the majority of scholars assign Edict XIII, or 553/554. According to the document, the post of praefectus Augustalis, to which civil authority in the Diocese of Egypt had previously belonged, was merged with that of the dux Aegypti, who commanded the troops of the provinces of Egypt Prima and Egypt Secunda. The new post of dux et Augustalis held full military and civil authority only in those two provinces, and its holder's income was increased to 2,880 solidus, the sum allocated to officials rose by two-thirds, and their number grew to 600. The two provinces of Thebais and Libya were reformed in an analogous manner.

The formation of Byzantine governmental structures in Italy had begun before the end of the Gothic Wars, and in 537 the Prefecture of Italy was established. By the mid-6th century the Kingdom of the Ostrogoths had ceased to exist and territories as far as the Alps had entered the empire. The frontier provinces of Raetia and Noricum, which had previously formed part of the realm of Theoderic the Great, were ceded to the Lombards, raising the question of how to organise a line of defence for Italy within its natural boundaries. Four frontier duchies were organised: with centres at Forum Iulii and Tridentum to guard the north and north-east, another duchy in the valley of Lakes Maggiore and Como, and in western northern Italy a duchy to defend the approaches to the Cottian Alps. These duchies were connected to one another by strategic roads, and when necessary the troops of one could be transferred to another. Simultaneously, the reorganisation of administration in the interior regions of Italy was carried out with the aim of consolidating dominion over the region and guarding against uprisings by the local population. Compared with the territorial divisions that had existed in the Gothic period, few changes occurred: the province of the Cottian Alps was separated from the province of Liguria, and in 556 the province of the Pennine Alps replaced the province of Tuscia Annonaria.

=== Governors' duties ===
Having lost their military powers after Diocletian's reforms, governors were able to devote more time to the administration of justice in their provinces. As before, they conducted circuits of the provinces (conventus), hearing cases in the cities, but now they had more time for this purpose, and since the provinces had become smaller, they were able to visit each city more frequently and for longer periods. The importance of the provincial capitals grew, as governors spent the greatest amount of their time there, and special chambers for conducting judicial proceedings appeared at the governor's residence (praetorium). As a rule, governors were entitled to deliver verdicts in civil and criminal cases, of which there was no small number. To ease their workload, governors delegated minor cases to special judges, iudices dati or pedanei. With the emperor's permission, prefects also appointed "defenders," defensor civitatis, to the cities, who had the power to hear minor cases and to arrest and hand over to the governor's court those accused of serious crimes. Finally, from the end of the 4th century bishops also received judicial powers. In their residences (episcopalis audientia) they heard certain categories of cases in which their decision was final. If they disagreed with a governor's verdict, provincial inhabitants could appeal to the vicar, the prefect, and ultimately to the emperor (supplicatio). If a case reached the highest instance, the governor was required to submit all the relevant materials, failing which he was subject to censure and disgrace.

The growth in the administrative powers of bishops is to be understood in the context of the theory of symphony. The relations between governors and bishops that took shape under Justinian were the culmination of a process that had begun two centuries earlier. In the inevitable conflicts between them, several factors placed bishops in a more advantageous position. First, the impossibility of appealing against episcopal verdicts placed them on a par with the praetorian prefects; secondly, their term of office was not limited as governors' terms were. Finally, by virtue of the powers granted to them, bishops could supervise the performance of governors' duties and, when necessary, address complaints directly to the emperor. In the view of a number of scholars, owing to a combination of circumstances — including the gradual strengthening of episcopal influence over provincial administration — the institution of civil governors collapsed by the end of the 6th and the beginning of the 7th century. Despite their rather limited powers, provincial governors had at their disposal a considerable staff of officials. In Novel 29, Justinian censures the practice of governors sending their representatives to the cities of the province and requires them to administer directly.

== Municipal self-government ==
The situation of Byzantine cities in the 6th century is difficult to assess due to the uneven preservation of archaeological and written sources across different provinces. Although some regions (Syria, Egypt, Anatolia) showed signs of prosperity, scholars note stagnation and decline for the empire as a whole, which intensified following the Plague of Justinian of the early 540s. The central problem, to which a significant portion of Justinian's legislation was devoted, was the flight of curiales and their property from the cities. By the 6th century, the role of municipal self-government had diminished considerably compared to the era of the ancient polis. The Antiochene rhetorician Libanius, writing in the late 4th century, attributed this phenomenon to the fact that powerful curiales welcomed the departure of their colleagues from city councils.

The consequence, however, was not only a growth in the power of the remaining council members, but also an increase in their share of financing for the construction of public buildings, festivals, and entertainments. On the other hand, for less wealthy decurions, the appeal of curial service was not obvious compared to a career in the Church or in imperial administration. Another factor contributing to the declining influence of city councils was the emergence in cities of a stratum of wealthy officials, both active and retired (honorati), who wielded greater influence than the traditional oligarchs. The influence of large ecclesiastical landowners grew, and against this backdrop the curiales, whose estates had been subdivided from generation to generation, appeared rather insignificant. The curia as a governing body disappeared in the 5th century, which became especially apparent during the reign of Anastasius I (491–518). John Malalas and John the Lydian named Marinus the Syrian, praetorian prefect in 512–515, as the one responsible for the destruction of the curial class, having entrusted the collection of taxes to special officials called vindices (vindices). It is possible that curiales survived in some form until the late 6th century. By the time city councils were formally abolished by Emperor Leo VI in the early 9th century, they had long been an anachronism.

The inability of city assemblies to organize costly events was already apparent in the early 5th century. In provincial capitals, the expenses of organizing public spectacles were borne by governors, often at the expense of funds collected from other cities in the province. Governors were also compelled to finance extraordinary food purchases in cases of famine, the erection of commemorative structures to mark imperial visits, and similar expenses. Since the wealthiest citizens avoided holding high positions in cities, their places were taken by men of moderate means, who had no ability to resist the influence of imperial officials. The need for a "defender of the city" (defensor civitatis) was recognized in the West no later than 409, while in the East this occurred almost a century later. In 505, Anastasius granted the clergy and major landowners the right to elect a grain buyer in times of famine, and in 545 Justinian extended their authority to the offices of curator (curator) and "father of the city" (pater civitatis). Justinian also noted the error of situations in which insignificant persons were elected to the office of defensor. His solution was to conduct elections on a rotational basis among the most prominent inhabitants of the city. How effective this approach proved to be is unknown. At the same time, legislative pressure on curiales intensified. Viewing them as corrupt individuals seeking by any means to evade their obligations, Justinian in 531 restricted the right of curia members to enter a monastery. Through severe legislation, the emperor limited the ability of curiales to inherit and dispose of their property. Novel 38, issued in 536, prohibited curiales from transferring property to private individuals and established an obligation to bequeath 3/4 of their property to the curia (instead of 1/4 previously). The same novel, as a means of replenishing the curial class, permitted the illegitimate children of curiales to perform municipal duties, sometimes even without the father's consent. The Code of Justinian (C.J., XI, 48.23) abolished the 30-year prescriptive right to leave the curia, thereby depriving curiales of any hope of release.

It is unknown what share of urban expenditure was covered by public revenues and what share by curial obligations. As A. Jones notes, two tendencies operated during Justinian's reign: owing to the flight of curiales, the capacity of those who remained to finance significant undertakings diminished, but at the same time the standard of urban life declined — games became less frequent and less extravagant, and superfluous structures were abandoned as unnecessary. The legislative evidence gives grounds for supposing that the regular expenditures of cities were as a rule financed from ordinary revenues, and only extraordinary ones from local taxpayers. A notable consequence of the disintegration of the curia and the transfer of power in cities to the broader class of "notables" was the deterioration of public services. Particularly painful was the loss of the capacity to maintain city archives, in which records of property transactions were kept. Novel 15 placed the obligation of maintaining archives on the defensor of the city.

== Administrative efficiency ==
Given the state of the sources, it is rather difficult to assess the effectiveness of the administrative structures available to Justinian. One approach is to evaluate how the empire's population perceived the state of affairs; another is to analyse the results achieved in relation to the costs incurred. The emperor employed various means of communicating with his subjects, from official proclamations to coin imagery, but from the standpoint of governance the primary channel was legislation, conveyed to the upper classes at provincial assemblies and to the rest of the population by posting laws on boards in public places. The system operated partly through persuasion and partly through fear of severe punishment. As the Australian Byzantinist Roger D. Scott notes, in Byzantine society fear was considered acceptable and beneficial to society. The chronicler John Malalas regarded with approval the atmosphere of fear that followed the persecution of homosexuals, the suppression of revolts in Palestine and the punishment of private citizens and magistrates who had broken the law. In his view, Justinian was thereby carrying out the will of God, making the world a better place. Procopius of Caesarea, by contrast, was an advocate of a more liberal and less repressive society. For their part, subjects had avenues for communicating with the emperor, whether by meeting him in person in Constantinople or by submitting a petition. Both individual citizens and communities acting through their representatives made use of these means. An important form of expressing public opinion was acclamations — that is, rhythmic exclamations. Known since antiquity, acclamations were originally used to honour individuals. A law of Constantine the Great in 331 regulated the use of acclamations by provincial assemblies to express approval or disapproval of governors — records of such speeches were henceforth to be sent directly to the emperor for appropriate action. (Note: This law was incorporated into the Code of Justinian.)

Since 371 onwards, provincials could use the imperial post to transmit their statements. From the 4th century, the management of acclamations in major cities was taken over by the racing factions. There are opposing views as to whether the factions expressed the opinions of broad sections of society through their acclamations or followed their own self-interested agendas. The emperor himself could also be the recipient of acclamations, and the Acta of Callopodius addressed to Justinian, preserved in the chronicle of Theophanes the Confessor, served as a prologue to the Nika revolt of 532. Another channel of interaction between the emperor and society was the Church, in whose affairs Justinian took an active part. There are known cases in which bishops transmitted to him reports of the oppression of the population by local authorities; the absence of such interaction with the Monophysite Church led to inadequate information reaching the central authorities about conditions in Egypt. The significance of curial elites as a channel of communication in the 6th century was negligible. A notable example of Justinian's responsiveness to criticism of his administrative reforms is the adjustment of the law establishing the office of the quaestor exercitus, whose jurisdiction encompassed both the provinces along the lower Danube and several Mediterranean provinces. The official's seat was located at Odessus (modern Varna) on the Black Sea coast, which caused inconvenience to the inhabitants of Caria, Cyprus, and the Islands. Novel 50, dated September 1, 537, permitted them to submit their judicial appeals to the Constantinople office of the quaestor's representative. Such willingness to make concessions to subjects, as well as Justinian's general accessibility for personal contact with his subjects, was highly atypical. (Note: Procopius of Caesarea wrote in the Secret History that "people, even those of low birth and complete obscurity, had every opportunity not only to appear before the tyrant, but to converse with him in secret".) By contrast, Evagrius Scholasticus wrote of Emperor Maurice (582–602) that he "did not like to converse with ordinary people, nor did he lend them his ear, knowing that the former leads to contempt and the latter inclines toward flattery".

From a financial standpoint, the administrative system of the late Roman Empire functioned, as A. H. M. Jones observes, with excessive efficiency — extracting taxes from subjects to the extent required and even beyond, making it possible to accumulate reserves and pay large sums to barbarians. Despite claims in certain sources of excessive taxation under Justinian, the available evidence does not confirm any significant fluctuations in the level of taxes collected. It can also be argued that the tax regime established in the 5th century persisted at least until the end of Justinian's reign, and in most provinces until the time of the Arab conquests. The total size of the Byzantine budget during Justinian's reign is unknown; various estimates suggest it may have ranged from 7 to 13 million solidus. The number of officials who kept the machinery of state functioning is also unknown, but is generally believed to have grown substantially following the reforms of Diocletian. Some estimates can be derived from the known number of staff in the Praetorian prefecture of Africa, which stood at 396 following Justinian's restoration of Byzantine rule there, and an average of 100 persons subordinate to each governor. Pay levels varied considerably by province and by post. At the lower grades, which constituted the majority, pay did not exceed the salary of an ordinary soldier — 9 solidi per year. As a result, officials supplemented their salaries through corruption.

== Significance and subsequent development ==
The structure of provincial administration created by Justinian in the 530s began to change even during his own lifetime. A complete abandonment of dioceses proved impossible, and in the late 550s the Diocese of Thrace was restored, probably in response to the invasion of the Kutrigurs. On August 13, 554, following the completion of the conquest of the Ostrogothic Kingdom, a series of documents collectively known as the Pragmatic Sanction was promulgated. These addressed questions of administration not only of Italy but of the empire as a whole. In particular, the sanction renewed the prohibition on the purchase of governorships and granted provincials the right to nominate their own rulers. As early as the 570s Byzantium began to lose the territories conquered under Justinian, and while the loss of Spain to the Visigoths and of Italy to the Lombards meant that the costs of their conquest would never be recouped, the loss of Egypt, Syria, and Palestine was of great economic significance. The further transformation of the Byzantine administrative system depended on the persistent military threat on all frontiers and a sharp reduction in revenues.

According to the traditional view formulated by John Bury, Justinian's provincial reforms were left incomplete, and their importance is determined by the place they occupy between the reforms of Diocletian and the creation of the theme system in the 7th century. George Ostrogorsky held a similar view. In the opinion of the British Marxist historian Perry Anderson, "the supreme bureaucratic apparatus of Byzantine autocracy remained unchanged for five centuries after Justinian," preserving "the close connection between the slave-owning mode of production and the imperial state superstructure".

== Bibliography ==
=== In English ===
- Barnish, S. (2008). "Government and administration". In Lee A. D.; Whitby M. (eds.). The Cambridge Ancient History. Vol. XIV. Cambridge: Cambridge University Press. pp. 164–206. ISBN 978-0-521-32591-2.
- Evans, J. A. S. (2000). The Age of Justinian: The circumstances of imperial power. New York: Routledge. p. 345. ISBN 0-203-13303-X.
- Jones, A. H. M. (1964). The Later Roman Empire 284–602. Vol. I–II.
- Haldon, J. F. (1997). Byzantium in the Seventh Century: The Transformation of a Culture. Cambridge: Cambridge University Press. p. 491. ISBN 0-521-26492-8.
- Haldon, J. F. (2005). "Economy and Administration: How Did the Empire Work?". The Cambridge Companion to the Age of Justinian. Cambridge: Cambridge University Press. pp. 28–59.
- Hendy, M. (1985). Studies in the Byzantine Monetary Economy c.300–1450. Cambridge: Cambridge University Press. p. 773. ISBN 0-521-24715-2.
- Karantabias, M. (2015). The Struggle Between the Center and the Periphery: Justinian's Provincial Reforms of the A.D. 530s. Theses and Dissertations—History. Lexington: University of Kentucky. p. 258.
- Kelly, Ch. (2004). Ruling the Later Roman Empire. Revealing Antiquity. Cambridge, MA: Harvard University Press. p. 341. ISBN 0-674-01564-9.
- Kazhdan, A. (1991). The Oxford Dictionary of Byzantium. Oxford and New York: Oxford University Press. ISBN 0-19-504652-8.
- Liebeschuetz, J. H. W. G. (2001). Decline and Fall of the Roman City. New York: Oxford University Press. p. 479. ISBN 0-19-815247-7.
- Maas, M. (1986). "Roman History and Christian Ideology in Justinianic Reform Legislation". Dumbarton Oaks Papers. 40. Dumbarton Oaks: 17–31. JSTOR 1291527.
- Maas, M. (1992). John Lydus and the Roman Past. New York: Routledge & Kegan Paul. p. 201. ISBN 0-203-97552-9.
- Moorhead, J. (1994). Justinian. The Medieval World. Longman. p. 202. ISBN 0-582-06304-3.
- Roueché, C. (1998). "Provincial governors and their titulature in the sixth century". Antiquité Tardive. 6: 83–89. doi:10.1484/J.AT.2.300876.
- Sarris, P. (2006). Economy and Society in the Age of Justinian. Cambridge: Cambridge University Press. p. 278. ISBN 978-0-511-24573-2.
- Shane Bjornlie, M. (2012). Politics and Tradition Between Rome, Ravenna and Constantinople. A Study of Cassiodorus and the Variae, 527–554. Cambridge: Cambridge University Press. p. 370. ISBN 978-1-139-23617-1.
- Slootjes, D. (2006). The Governor and his Subjects in the Later Roman Empire. Brill. p. 204. ISBN 978-90-04-15070-6.
- de Ste. Croix, G. (1954). "Suffragium: From Vote to Patronage". The British Journal of Sociology. 5 (1): 33–48. JSTOR 588044.

=== In Russian ===
- Adonts, N. G. (1971). Armeniya v epokhu Yustiniana [Armenia in the Age of Justinian] (2nd ed.). Yerevan: Yerevan State University Press. p. 526.
- Borodin, O. R. (1991). Vizantiyskaya Italiya v VI–VIII vekakh (Ravennskiy ekzarkhat i Pentapol') [Byzantine Italy in the 6th–8th Centuries (The Exarchate of Ravenna and the Pentapolis)]. Barnaul: Den'. p. 366. ISBN 5-87028-005-2.
- Borodin, O. R. (2001). Ravennskiy ekzarkhat. Vizantiyтsy v Italii [The Exarchate of Ravenna. The Byzantines in Italy]. Vizantiyskaya biblioteka. Issledovaniya. Saint Petersburg: Aleteia. p. 474. ISBN 5-89329-440-8.
- Udaltsova, Z. V. (1959). Italiya i Vizantiya v VI veke [Italy and Byzantium in the 6th Century]. Moscow: USSR Academy of Sciences Press. p. 542.
- Chekalova, A. A. (2010). Senat i senatorskaya aristokratiya Konstantinopolya. IV — pervaya polovina VII veka [The Senate and the Senatorial Aristocracy of Constantinople. 4th — First Half of the 7th Century]. Moscow: Nauka. p. 341. ISBN 978-5-02-037568-0.

=== In German ===
- Rubin, B. (1960). Das Zeitalter Iustinians [The Age of Justinian]. Vol. I. Berlin: Walter de Gruyter & Co. p. 539.

=== In French ===
- Avramea, A. (1997). Le Péloponnèse du IVe au VIIIe siècle: changements et persistances [The Peloponnese from the 4th to the 8th Century: Changes and Continuities]. Paris: Publications de la Sorbonne. p. 218.
- Collot, C. (1965). "La pratique et l'institution du «suffragium» au Bas-Empire" [The Practice and Institution of «suffragium» in the Late Empire]. Revue historique de droit français et étranger. 43: 185–221. JSTOR 43852026.
- Diehl, Ch. (1888). Études sur l'administration byzantine dans l'exarchat de Ravenne [Studies on Byzantine Administration in the Exarchate of Ravenna]. Paris: (Unknown). p. 421.
