= Institutes (Justinian) =

Sixth century codification of Roman law

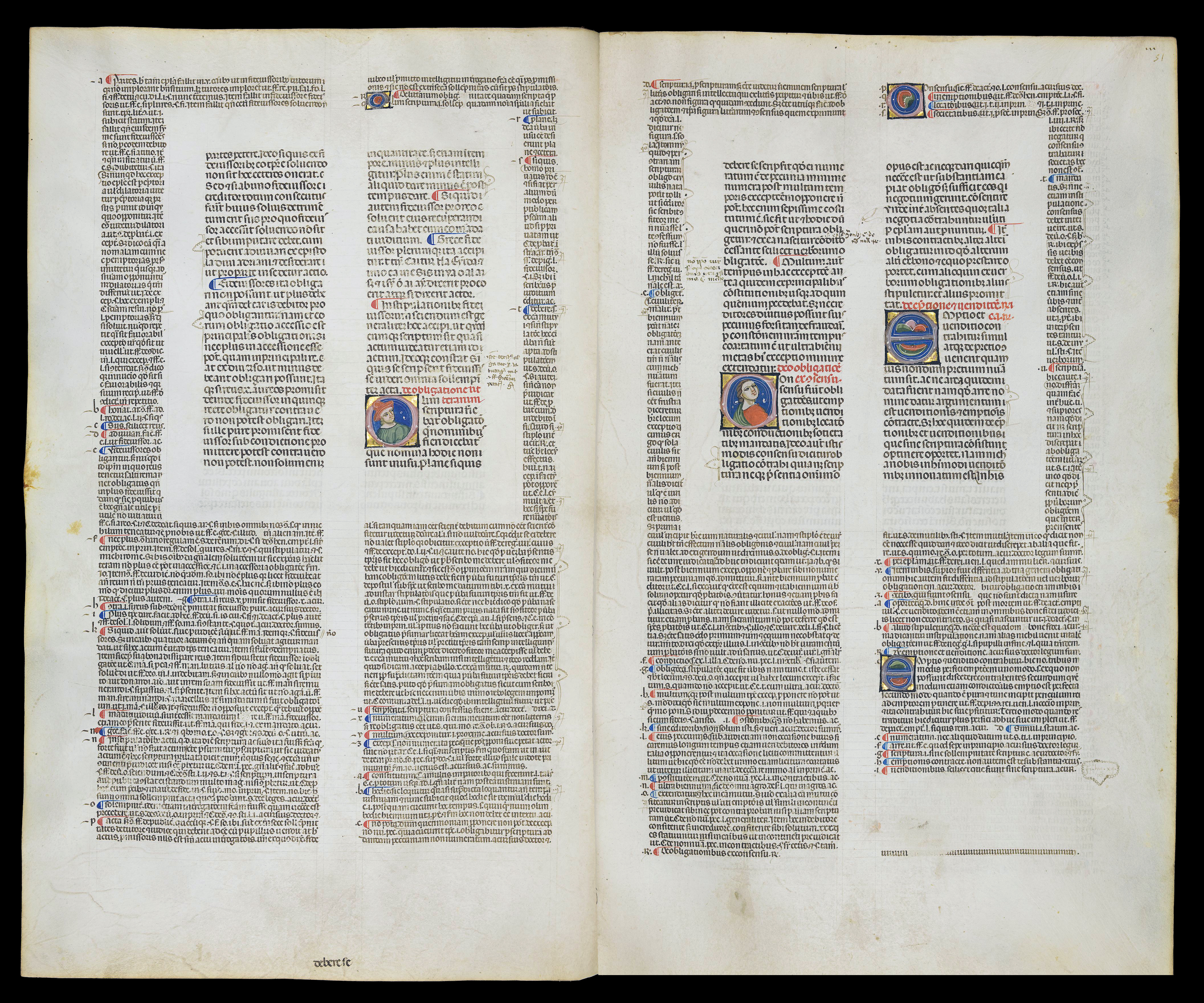
14th-century manuscript of the Institutiones with the glossa ordinaria on the margins.

The Institutes (Latin: Institutiones) is a component of the Corpus Juris Civilis, the 6th-century codification of Roman law ordered by the Byzantine emperor Justinian I. It is largely based upon the Institutes of Gaius, a Roman jurist of the second century A.D. The other parts of the Corpus Juris Civilis are the Digest, the Codex Justinianus, and the Novellae Constitutiones ("New Constitutions" or "Novels").

== Drafting and publication ==
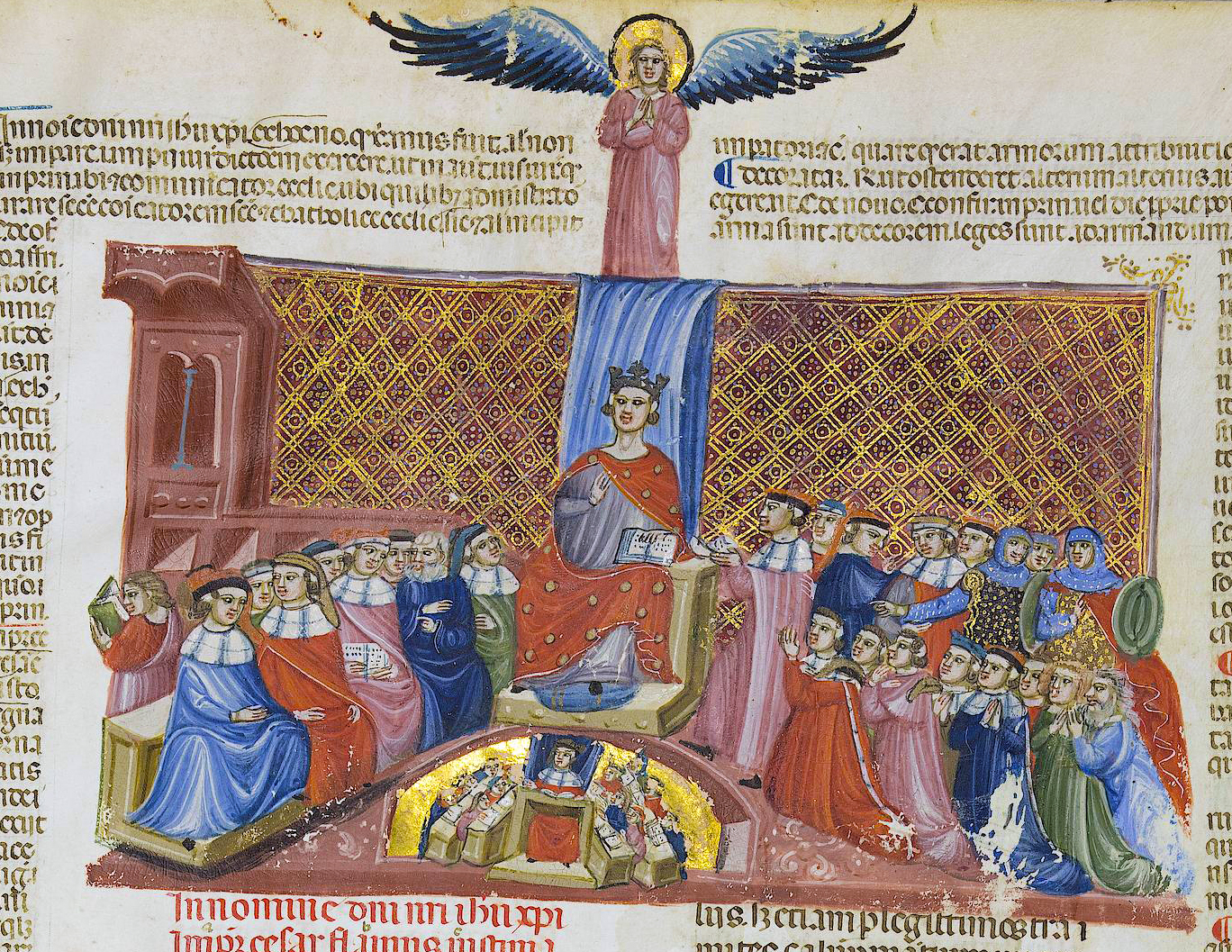
14th-century miniature depicting Justinian having the Institutiones compiled.

Justinian's Institutes was one part of his effort to codify Roman law and to reform legal education, of which the Digest also was a part. Whereas the Digest was to be used by advanced law students, Justinian's Institutes was to be a textbook for new students. The need for a new text for first year students was addressed as early as 530 in the constitution "Deo auctore," where reference is made to something "...which may be promulgated to replace the elementary works, so that the raw intelligence of the student, nourished by a simple diet, may proceed more easily to advanced legal studies." Under the supervision of Tribonian, two law professors (Theophilus and Dorotheus) were assigned to extract statements about the basic institutions ("Institutiones") of Roman law from the teaching books created by writers of "authority" (as defined in the Law of Citations). The bulk of this new Institutes is the Institutes of Gaius, much of it taken verbatim; but it also uses material from the Institutes of Marcian, Florentinus, Ulpian, and perhaps Paulus (the other writers of "authority"). There is some debate over which of the commission members is responsible for what part of the new Institutes. Most recently it has been suggested that Theophilus and Dorotheus created the extracts taken from the older works, while Tribonian revised and added new imperial laws.

This new version of the Institutes was published on November 21, 533 and promulgated with the Digest on December 30, 533. These new Institutes were not only a textbook for first year law students, but, according to the decree that promulgated them (C. Tanta), they carried the force of law. First year law students used Justinian's Institutes as their textbook for centuries.

== Structure and content ==
The Institutes of Justinian is arranged much like Gaius's work, being divided into three subjects in four books covering "persons," "things", and "actions." The first book considers the legal status of persons (personae), the second and third deal with things (res), while the fourth discusses Roman civil procedure (actiones). Unlike the Digest, the extracts do not provide inscriptions indicating from whom the original material was taken.

== Modern editions and translations ==
Justinian's Institutes was largely unknown in the West. The earliest known manuscript are fragments of a Veronese palimpsest of the ninth century. The first printed edition of Justinian's Institutes was Petrus Schoyff's in 1468. Scholars using the Veronese palimpsest suggested changes to the existing text, and these criticisms resulted in the definitive texts by Paul Krüger and Eduard Huschke in 1867 and 1868 respectively. The most frequently used modern version of Justinian's Institutes is that of Krüger, which is in volume one of the Krüger, Mommsen, Kroll and Schoell stereotype edition.

There are several translations of Justinian's Institutes into English, the better of the older ones being those of J. B. Moyle and Thomas Collett Sandars. More recent translations by Birks & McLeod are also available as facing editions with Krüger's Latin. Samuel Parsons Scott translated the Institutes into English as part of his translation of the entire "Corpus Juris Civilis," but his translation has not been well received.

== See also ==
- Constitution (Roman law)
- International Roman Law Moot Court
- List of Roman laws
- Novel (Roman law)
