= Novella (disambiguation) =

A novella is a written, fictional, prose narrative longer than a novelette but shorter than a novel.

Novella may also refer to:

== Arts, entertainment, and media ==
- The Novella, a 1653 play by Richard Brome
- Novella (album), a 1977 album by Renaissance
- "Novella", a song by Funeral for a Friend from Casually Dressed & Deep in Conversation

== People ==
- Agostino Novella (1905–1974), Italian trade unionist and communist politician
- Steven Novella (born 1964), American neurologist and skeptic
- Una Novella/Rita Novella, aliases of American singer, dancer and actress Dona Drake
- Novella Calligaris (born 1954), Italian swimmer
- Novella Carpenter, American writer
- Novella d'Andrea (died 1333), Italian legal scholar
- Novella Matveyeva (1934–2016), Russian bard, poet, writer, screenwriter, dramatist, and literary scientist
- Novella Nelson (1939–2017), American actress and singer
- Novella Schiesaro (born 1973), Italian basketball player
- Novella Jewell Trott (1846–1929), American author and editor

== Other uses ==
- Novella, Haute-Corse, a commune in France
- A type of Roman law, see Novel (Roman law)
- A type of rabbinic literature, see Chiddush
- Novellae Constitutiones or The Novels, laws passed by Byzantine Emperor Justinian I

== See also ==
- Novel (disambiguation)
- Novela (disambiguation)
- Novella 2000, an Italian magazine
