= Novel (disambiguation) =

A novel is a work of long prose narrative fiction.

Novel(s) or The Novel(s) may also refer to:

== Arts and entertainment ==
- Novel (film), a 2008 Indian Malayalam-language film
- Novel: A Forum on Fiction, a literary journal
- The Novel, a 1991 novel by James A. Michener
- "Novel", a musical side project of Adam Young's

== Laws ==
- Novellae Constitutiones or The Novels, laws passed by Byzantine Emperor Justinian I
- Novels (Roman law), a term for a new Roman law in the Byzantine era

== Medicine ==
- Novel virus, a virus that has not previously been recorded
  - Novel coronavirus, a provisional name given to recently discovered coronaviruses of medical significance

== People ==
- Novel (musician) (born 1981), American hip-hop artist
- Novel Baswedan (born 1977), Indonesian investigator

== Other uses ==
- Novel, Haute-Savoie, a commune in eastern France
- Novel, Inc., a video game studio and enterprise simulation developer

== See also ==
- Novell, defunct American multinational software and services company
- Novella (disambiguation)
- Novelty (disambiguation)
