= Novela =

Novela or Novelas may refer to:

== Geography ==
- Novelas (Novelas (Penafiel)), in Penafiel, a parish in Portugal; see List of parishes of Portugal: P
- Port-la-Nouvelle, Narbonne, Aude, France (Occitan: La Novèla); a commune

== Literature ==
- Novel genre in Spain and Latin America
  - Novelas ejemplares of Cervantes
  - Novella, a short novel

== Film and TV ==
- Telenovela, genre in Latin America
- Novela TV, Polish TV
- Novela de un joven pobre, 1968 film

== Music ==
=== Albums ===
- Novela, album by Céu, 2024
- Novela, album by Tony Malaby, and Kris Davis
- La Novela, album by Akwid, 2008
- Novelas, album by Caetano Veloso
- Novelas, album by Djavan, 2001
- Novelas, album by Gal Costa, 2005
- Novelas, album by Marina Elali
- Novelas, album by Marina Lima, 2007
- Novelas, album by Martinho da Vila, 2006
- Novelas, album by Os Paralamas do Sucesso, 2010
- Novelas, album by Rita Lee, 2002

== See also ==
- Novel (disambiguation)
- Novella (disambiguation)
