= Serena Connolly =

American Ancient Roman scholar

Serena Connolly is a scholar of Ancient Roman history, with a research focus on Roman Social History and Latin literature. Connolly received a B.A. from Cambridge University in 1998. She went on to earn a Ph.D. at Yale University in 2004, where her doctoral dissertation (“Access to law in Late Antiquity Status, corruption, and the evidence of the "Codex Hermogenianus”) was directed by John F. Matthews. She held the positions of Lecturer in the Classics Department at Yale University from 2004 to 2007 and then Visiting assistant professor in the Classics Department at Rutgers University from 2007 to 2008, before accepting a tenure-track position as assistant professor in the Classics Department at Rutgers in 2008. She was awarded tenure and promotion to associate professor in 2012.

Connolly's published her revised doctoral dissertation as Lives behind the Laws: The World of the Codex Hermogenianus (Indiana University Press) in 2010. She was awarded a Mellon Fellowship for Assistant Professors at the School of Historical Studies of the Institute for Advanced Study at Princeton from 2009 to 2010. She has published more than 10 journal articles and book chapters, and was a contributing editor to a recently published translation of the Code of Justinian.

She served as Graduate Director of the Rutgers Classics Department from 2009 to 2010 and again from 2014 to 2016.

From 2017 to 2020, Connolly served as President of the Association of Ancient Historians.

== Selected publications ==
- Serena Connolly, Lives behind the Laws: The World of the Codex Hermogenianus (Bloomington, IN.: Indiana University Press, 2010).
- Serena Connolly, "Constantine and the Veterans," in Edward Watts, Scott McGill and Cristiana Sogno, eds., The Roman Empire from the Tetrarchy to Theodosius II (Cambridge: Cambridge University Press, 2010), pp. 188–233.
- Serena Connolly, "Binarism in the Disticha Catonis," Mnemosyne 66 (2013), pp. 228–246
- Serena Connolly, "Disticha Catonis Uticensis," Classical Philology 107 (April 2012), pp. 119-130.
- Serena Connolly, "The Meter of the Disticha Catonis," Classical Journal 107 (2012), pp. 313–29.
