= Gregor Haloander =

German legal scholar (1501–1531)

Gregor Haloander (born as Gregor Meltzer; 1501 – 7 September 1531) was a German legal scholar. He authored a recension of the Digest of Roman law.

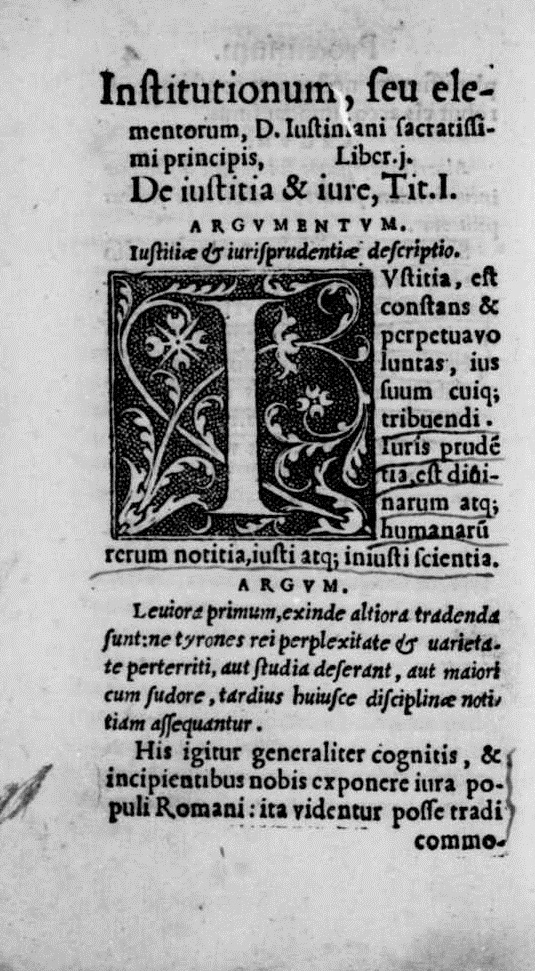
Corpus Iuris civilis, 1540

== Works ==
- Corpus Iuris civilis. Venice. 1529.
  - Corpus Iuris civilis (in Italian). Paris: Charlotte Guillard. 1540.
- Nearon Ioustinianou biblion, 1531.
