= Thomas Collett Sandars =

English barrister and editor of Justinian (1825–1894)

Thomas Collett Sandars (1825–1894) was an English barrister, best known as an editor of the Institutes of Justinian.

== Life ==
The eldest son of Samuel Sandars of Lochnere, near Hemel Hempstead, Hertfordshire, he matriculated at Balliol College, Oxford, on 30 November 1843. He was a scholar there from 1843 to 1849, graduated B.A. in 1848 (having taken first-class honours in literis humanioribus and the chancellor's Latin-verse prize), became fellow of Oriel College in 1849, and proceeded M.A. in 1851.

Sandars was called to the bar in 1851, and was reader of constitutional law and history to the Inns of Court from 1865 to 1873. He had interests in commerce, in later years, and went twice to Egypt in 1877 and 1880 to represent the Association of Foreign Bondholders. He was also chairman of the Mexican Railway Company.

Sandars died on 2 August 1894 at Queen Anne's Mansions, Westminster.

== Works ==
Sandars is remembered mainly for his edition of Justinian's Institutes, which first appeared in 1853; it reached an eighth edition in 1888. He was also an early contributor to the Saturday Review, and a close friend of James FitzJames Stephen. It was in reviewing the novel Two Years Ago there in 1857 that Sandars coined the phrase "muscular Christianity".

== Family ==
Sandars married, on 25 May 1851, Margaret, second daughter of William Hanmer of Bodnod Hall, Denbighshire, and left a family.

== Notes ==
Attribution

This article incorporates text from a publication now in the public domain: Lee, Sidney, ed. (1897). "Sandars, Thomas Collett". Dictionary of National Biography. Vol. 50. London: Smith, Elder & Co.
