= Tribonian =

Byzantine jurist (c. 485–542)

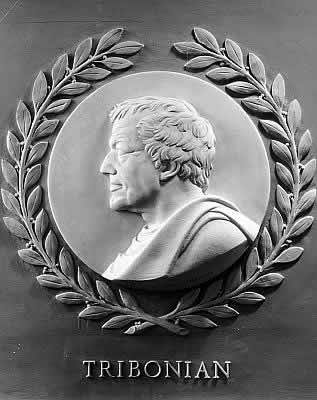
- Bas-relief plaque of Tribonian in the Chamber of the United States House of Representatives in the United States Capitol.
- Born: c. 485 (?); Side (modern-day Side, Antalya, Turkey)
- Died: 542 (aged about 57); Constantinople (modern-day Istanbul, Turkey)
- Occupations: jurist and advisor
- Years active: 529-542
- Known for: supervised the revision of the legal code of the Byzantine Empire into the Code of Justinian.

Tribonian (Greek: Τριβωνιανός [trivonia'nos], c. 485? – 542) was a Greek jurist and advisor of the Eastern Roman Empire (Byzantine). During the reign of the Emperor Justinian I, he supervised the revision of the empire's legal code. He has been described as one of the wisest collaborators of Justinian.

Tribonian was a Greek from Cyme, who studied law in Constantinople, where he became the most renowned legal scholar of his day. He was a close friend of Emperor Justinian, who appointed him to head the commission that compiled the Codex Justinianus and the Digest. Justinian also appointed Tribonian to high offices in the imperial administration, such as magister officiorum and quaestor sacri palatii, but at the beginning of the Nika riots he was forced to dismiss him on charges made by his enemies. Tribonian died in 542 of a disease, perhaps the plague.

== Biography ==
Tribonian was a Greek, born in Cyme, in Pamphylia (modern Side), around the year 485. He may have been a pagan. He was well educated and practiced law before the court of the praetorian prefect. Justinian made Tribonian magister officiorum (Master of Offices), although it is not clear when, and then appointed him quaestor sacri palatii in September 529.

In 528, before he was appointed quaestor, Tribonian was named by Justinian as one of the commissioners charged with preparing the new imperial legal code, the Codex Justinianeus, which subsequently was issued on April 7, 529. In 530, after Tribonian had become quaestor, it was natural for Justinian to put him in charge of the next major law reform project: compiling and harmonizing the writings of classical Roman jurists. Justinian's main objects in creating this harmonized compilation of juristic writings were to shorten litigation (by clarifying the law), and to create a syllabus to be used at the law schools in Berytus (Beirut) and Constantinople. During the same period, Tribonian also was charged with carrying out another aspect of Justinian's reforms in legal education and codification — creating a textbook for first-year law students by updating the Institutes of Gaius. Both the Digest and the new Institutes of Justinian were promulgated in December of 533. In 534, Justinian decided that so many new laws had been passed, and so many older ones harmonized, since the publication of his first Code in 529, a second edition was needed. Hence, the Codex repetitae praelectionis was published, entirely superseding the edition of 529, the text of which has been lost.

In 532, Tribonian was removed as quaestor due to the charges of corruption made by his enemies during the Nika riots, but he continued to work on the codification. He was restored to his post as quaestor in 535 and continued in that position until his death. Tribonian continued to help draft new laws for Justinian; these new laws (Novellae Constitutiones) were later combined with the Codex Justinianus, the Digest and the Institutes to comprise the Corpus Juris Civilis.

Tribonian died in 542 of a disease, perhaps the plague. Tribonian's career is summarized by his noted modern biographer, Tony Honoré, in this way: "...he was Justinian's minister for legislation and propaganda for nearly twelve years...In these years the three volumes of the Corpus Juris Civilis and most of the surviving legislation of Justinian's reign were produced. He drafted about three-quarters of the surviving constitutions of Justinian's reign. He planned and directed the work of the Second Law Commission, which produced the Digest, the Institutes and the Second "Codex Iustinianus."

== Work ==
The Suda attributes the following works to Tribonian:

- "Commentary on Ptolemy's Canon"
- "Concord of the Cosmic and Harmonic Arrangement"
- "On the Ruling and Governing Planet"
- "On the Houses of the Planets"
- "On the 24 Metrical Feet and the 28 Rhythmic Feet"
- "Translation of Homer's Catalogue of Ships" (presumably into Latin)
- "Macedonian Dialogue, or On Happiness"
- "Life of Theodotus the Philosopher" (Bernhardy suggested that the text originally read "Theodosius" rather than "Theodotus")
- "Consular Speech to Emperor Justinian"
- "Royal Speech to Justinian"
- "On the Succession of the Months"
