= Suffragium =

Suffragium (plural suffragia) was the practice of buying and selling provincial governorships in the later Roman Empire and the early Byzantine Empire. Suffragium was prohibited by Justinian I in 535 AD.

== Literature ==
- Arnold Hugh Martin Jones (1964). The Later Roman Empire, 284-602: A Social Economic and Administrative Survey. Taylor & Francis. pp. 391-396. ISBN 9780801833540.
