= Novelty (disambiguation) =

Novelty is the characteristic of being new or heretofore unseen. It may also refer to:

== Science and technology ==
- Novelty seeking, psychological stance
- Novelty effect, tendency for human performance to briefly improve simply due to the increased interest in new technology rather than due to the technology itself
- Novelty (patent), part of the legal test to determine whether an invention is patentable
- Apomorphy, evolutionary novelty, a characteristic that is different from the form of an ancestor
- Novelty in scientific naming relating to newly discovered taxa (e.g. new species - sp. nov ) or new names (nomina nova)

== Arts ==
- Novelty (album) by Jawbox
- Novelty dance, a type of dance that is popular for being unusual or humorous
- Novelty song, a musical item that capitalizes on something new, unusual, or a current fad
- Novelty architecture, a building or other structure that is interesting because it has an amusing design

== Commerce ==
- Novelty item, a small manufactured adornment, toy or collectable
- Promotional item, novelties used in promotional marketing

== Places ==
- Novelty, Missouri, a place in the United States
- Novelty, Ohio, an unincorporated community in the United States

== Other ==
- Novelty (chess), a chess term for a move in chess which has never been played before in a recorded game
- Novelty (locomotive), one of the first steam locomotives which was due to compete at the Rainhill Trials of 1829. Also the name of loco 86235 appearing in the 150th Cavalcase celebrating the Liverpool and Manchester Railway.
- Novelty theory, an eschatological theory promoted by Terence McKenna
