= Novellae Constitutiones =

Unit of Roman law

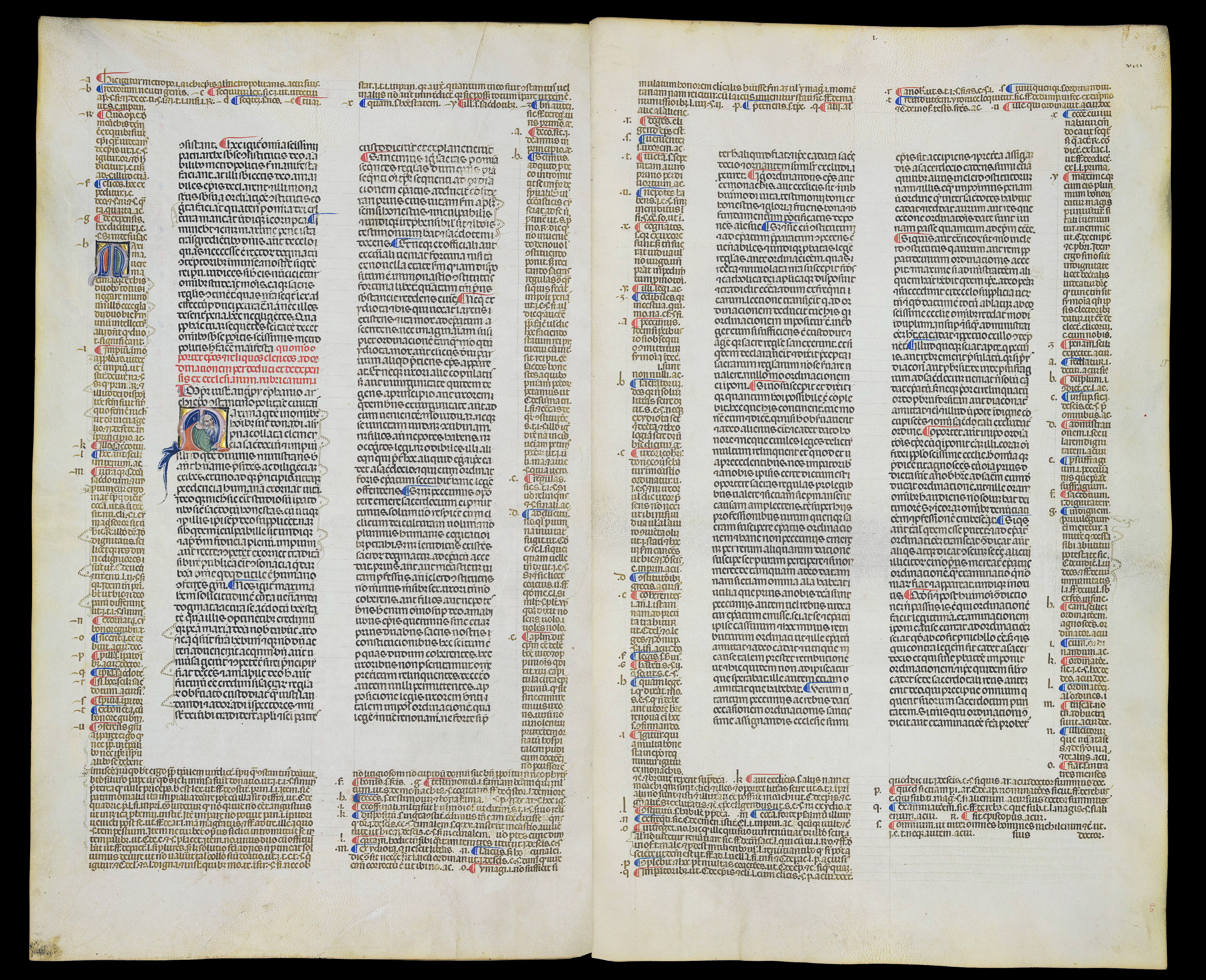
The Novellae Constitutiones in a 14th-century manuscript with the glossa ordinaria on the margins.

The Novellae Constitutiones ("new constitutions"; Ancient Greek: Νεαραὶ διατάξεις, romanized: Nearaì diatáxeis), or Justinian's Novels, are now considered one of the four major units of Roman law initiated by Roman emperor Justinian I in the course of his long reign (AD 527–565). The other three pieces are: the Codex Justinianus, the Digest, and the Institutes. Justinian's quaestor Tribonian was primarily responsible for compiling the latter three. Together, the four parts are known as the Corpus Juris Civilis. Whereas the Code, Digest, and Institutes were designed by Justinian as coherent works, the Novels are a diverse body of laws enacted after 534 (when he promulgated the second edition of the Code) that were never officially compiled during his reign.

== History ==
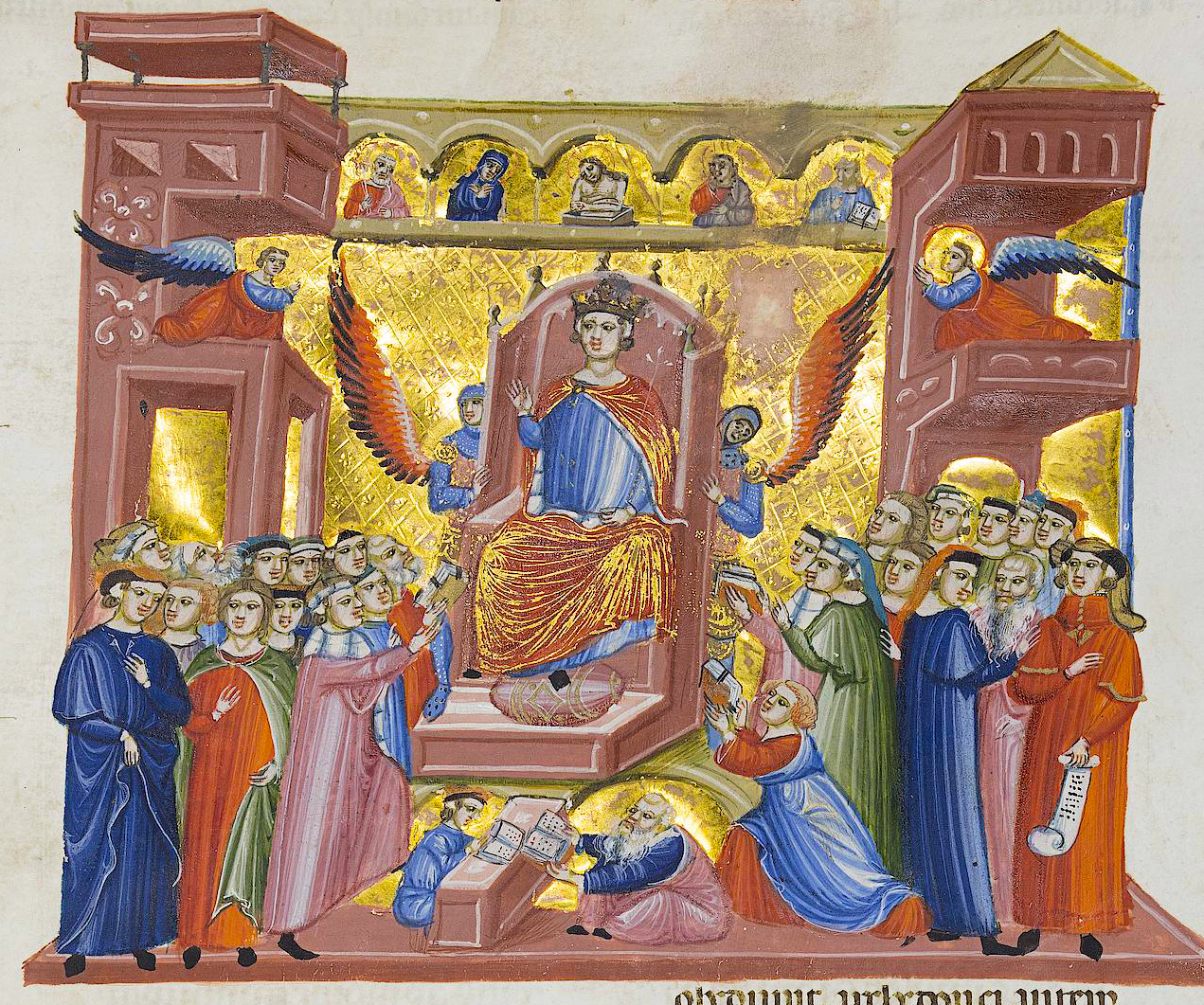
14th-century miniature depicting Justinian having his laws written down.

Justinian’s first Code, issued in 529, compiled and harmonized the imperial enactments (constitutiones, or constitutions) of previous emperors. After the Code was promulgated, only it, and not the prior imperial legislation, could be cited as law. However, in 530 and 531, Justinian issued the quinquaginta decisiones (fifty decisions) that resolved differences among the writings of classical jurists, and he continued to issue other new laws as well. This meant the Code could no longer be the sole, unified source of imperial legislation. Hence, in 534 Justinian issued the Constitutio cordi nobis, creating a second edition of the Code (Codex repetitae praelectionis). This edition integrated his new legislation into the imperial enactments in the first edition and superseded it.

Justinian continued to legislate after he created the second edition of the Code. Thus, in his pragmatic sanction of 554 (Sanctio pragmatica pro petitione Vigilii), he foresaw that he would need to maintain a collection of these new constitutions modifying the Code (novellae constitutiones, quae post nostri codicis confectionem). This he did in the form of an archive called the Liber legum or Libri legum.

== Timeline ==
While Justinian never made an official manuscript compilation of the new laws, private persons filled this void by making unofficial collections in several forms. The following timeline provides a succinct description of these collections and explains how they were transmitted through the centuries.

- 556 Julianus, a law professor in Constantinople, creates the Epitome Juliani, a summary of 124 novels (or 122, as two are duplicates) from 535-555, for his Latin-speaking students. The E.J. is a partially annotated Latin summary of the novels, most of which were officially issued in Greek. Because it is in Latin, the Epitome Juliani is the preferred source of the Novels in the West in the early Middle Ages, until about 1100, when another version is discovered there.
- 556? A collection of 134 novels issued between 535-556 is compiled around this time. Mostly a word-for-word, full-text translation of Greek novels, it also includes those few novels originally in Latin and the Latin versions of a few originally done in both Latin and Greek. When it is discovered in Bologna around 1100, it comes to be known as the Authenticum, because Irnerius and other Glossators think it an official compilation made at Justinian's order. (It is also sometimes called the versio vulgata.)
- 575–580 A collection of 168 novels (or 166, as most are in Greek but two are repeated as Latin versions) is created during the reign of Tiberius II Constantine. Two manuscripts of this compilation discovered in the Middle Ages—the Venetian and the Florentine—form the basis of print editions during the Renaissance that are referred to as the Greek Collection of 168. (Two Greek epitomes of the Novels that did not prove influential for Roman law in the West also are compiled around this time. The "Epitome of Athanasius," composed around 572, contains summaries of 153 novels found in the Greek Collection of 168. Unlike those of other collections, these are arranged entirely by subject. "The Epitome of Theodore," using the same novels included in Greek Collection of 168, is compiled between 575-600.)
- 600-800 Juliani Epitome manuscripts circulate in Europe. The E.J. is the main source of Roman law there until the Authenticum surfaces. Other parts of what come to be known as Corpus Jurus Civilis are little known in the West.
- 892 The Basilika is published during reign of Byzantine Emperor Leo VI the Wise. Based on the Greek Collection of 168 novels, it includes extracts of many novels, along with parts of the Digest, Code, & Institutes, supplemented by scholia (interpretive notes). The Basilika is used later to help reconstruct the Novels.
- 12th century The Authenticum appears in Bologna and largely replaces the Epitome Juliani. Justinian's Digest, Institutes, Code, and Novels begin to be called Corpus Juris Civilis (body of the civil law) to differentiate them from the Corpus Juris Canonici (body of the canon, or Church, law). The CJC at that time is organized differently than today. Its units were: the Digest (50 books) divided into three volumes; next, the first 9 books of the Code; and, together as a fifth volume, the Institutes, the last 3 books of the Code (Tres libri), and the Novels in the form of the Authenticum. This fifth volume was called Volumen, or Volumen parvum (an "insignificant" volume—as compared with the other four volumes of the CJC).
- 13th century The Venetian manuscript (Codex Marcianus—so called because it was housed in the library of St. Mark's in Venice; an early 16th century copy of this manuscript in the Vatican is referred to as the Palatino-Vaticanus) of the 168 novel Greek Collection is created around this time. Its last 3 laws are decrees of the praetorian prefect, 4 are novels of Justin II, and 2 are given twice. Also included, as an appendix, are 13 edicta, or edicts, some of which repeat novels in the main collection.
- 14th century The Florentine manuscript (Codex Laurentianus—called the Laurentianus because it belongs to the Laurentian Library in Florence.) (Note: Lodovicio Bolognini made copy of the Florentine manuscript in the early 16th century that is referred to as the Bolognese manuscript or Bononiensis,) also based on the 168 novel Greek Collection, but of lesser quality, is drafted in the 14th century.
- 1476 The first print edition of Novels is published in Rome with the Tres Libri of the Code and the Institutes; the novels are based on the Authenticum.

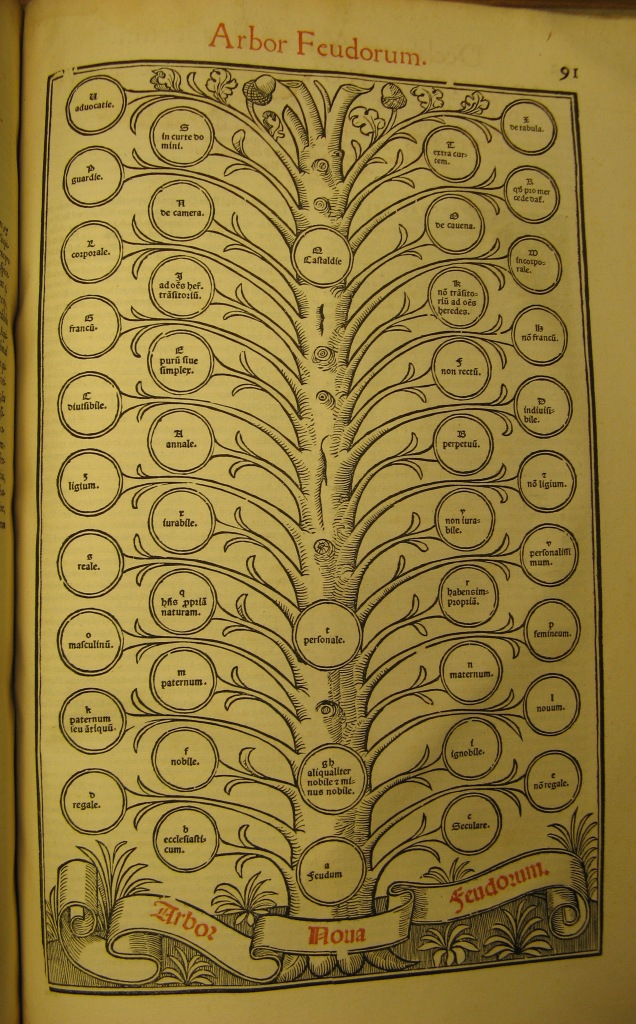
"Arbor feudorum" diagramming feudal rights, from a 1553 Lyon edition of Justinian's Novels

- 1531 Gregor Haloander compiles the first book consisting only of the Novels—as taken from the Bolognese copy of the Codex Laurentianus.
- 1558 Henry Scrimgeour creates an edition of the Novels based on the Palatino-Vaticanus copy of the Venetian manuscript.
- 1571 Antonius Contius constructs an influential edition of the Novels using both the Authenticum and 168 novel Greek Collection texts.
- 1834 A German translation of the Novels, by Freiesleben and Schneider, is published as part of Carl Eduard Otto, Bruno Schilling & Carl Friedrich Sintenis's edition of the Corpus Juris Civilis. It is based mainly on the Greek Collection but also uses the Authenticum, the Epitome Juliani, and the Basilica.
- 1840 Eduard Osenbrüggen's edition of the Novels, based on both the Venetian and Florentine manuscripts of the Greek Collection, is published in the Kriegel brothers' edition of the CJC.
- 1851 Gustav Ernst Heimbach publishes his critical edition of the Authenticum.
- 1873 A critical edition of the Epitome Juliani is issued by Gustav Hänel.
- 1881 Karl Eduard Zachariae von Lingenthal's critical edition of the Novels re-establishes many of their subscriptions.
- 1895 The Novels by Rudolf Schoell (completed by Wilhelm Kroll), based on Greek collection of 168, and supplemented by the other versions and critical studies, is issued as volume 3 of Theodor Mommsen, Paul Krüger, Schoell, & Kroll's classic 3 volume editio stereotypa of the CJC. It includes the 13 edicts and an appendix of 9 other laws of Justinian found in various ancient manuscripts.
- 1932 Samuel Parsons Scott's English translation of the CJC is published. Unfortunately, Scott uses the Kriegel brothers' edition of the CJC rather than that of Mommsen, Krüger, Schoell and Kroll, and his translation is severely criticized. Moreover, he fails to translate the 13 edicts, which were included by Ossenbruggen in the Kriegel edition, and ignores the additional laws presented in the appendix by Schoell and Kroll.
- 1943 Fred H. Blume sends his English translation of Justinian's Code and Novels to Clyde Pharr.
- 1964 The first English translation of the Thirteen Edicts made from the Greek is published by William Sims Thurman as his doctoral dissertation.
- 2008 Blume's Code and Novels are published on Annotated Justinian Code website.
- 2013 Selective English translation of Kroll's Preface to the Novels published by Miller and Kearley.
- 2018 An English translation of the Novels from the original Greek, by David J.D. Miller and Peter Sarris, is published by the Cambridge University Press.

== See also ==
- Constitution (Roman law)
- International Roman Law Moot Court
- List of Roman laws
- Novel (Roman law)

== Bibliography ==
- Noailles, Pierre (1912a). Les collections de Novelles de l'Empereur Justinien (PDF) (in French). Vol. 1. Paris: Recueil Sirey. OL 24633480M.
- Noailles, Pierre (1912b). Les collections de Novelles de l'Empereur Justinien (in French). Vol. 2. Paris: Recueil Sirey.
