= Paul Krüger (jurist) =

German jurist (1840–1926)

Paul Krüger (20 March 1840 – 11 May 1926) was a German jurist.

== Biography ==
He was born in Berlin, where he studied jurisprudence (1858–60). In 1863, he began to lecture on Roman law at the University of Berlin. In 1870, he became an associate professor of law at the University of Marburg, where he attained a full professorship during the following year. Afterwards, he served as a professor at the universities of Innsbruck (from 1872), Königsberg (from 1874; rector 1883/84) and Bonn (from 1888).

== Works ==
- Prozessualische Konsumtion und Rechtskraft des Erkenntnisses (“Diligence in legal proceedings and the validity of judgments,” 1864)
- Kritik des Justinianischen Codex (“Critique of the Justinian Codex,” 1867)
- Kritische Versuche im Gebiete des römischen Rechts (“Critical studies in the realm of Roman law,” 1870)
- Geschichte der Quellen und Litteratur des römischen Rechts (“History of the sources and literature of Roman law,” 1888; French tr. J. Brissaud, 1893)
- Justinianische Institutionen (“Justinian institutions,” 1867)

He also published a critical edition of the Codex Justinianus (1877).
