= Novel (Roman law) =

In Roman law, a novel (Latin: novella constitutio, "new decree"; Greek: νεαρά, romanized: neara) is a new decree or edict, in other words a new law. The term was used from the fourth century AD onwards and was specifically used for laws issued after the publishing of the Codex Theodosianus in 438 and then for the Justinianean Novels, or Novellae Constitutiones. The term was used on and off in later Roman history until falling out of use during the late Byzantine period.

== See also ==
- Constitution (Roman law)
- International Roman Law Moot Court
- List of Roman laws
