= International Roman Law Moot Court =

International Roman Law Moot
- Established: 2008
- Venue: Varies
- Subject matter: Roman law
- Class: International
- Qualification: Partly regional rounds
- Most championships: University of Cambridge (3), University of Oxford (3)
- Website: https://www.irlm.law.cam.ac.uk/about

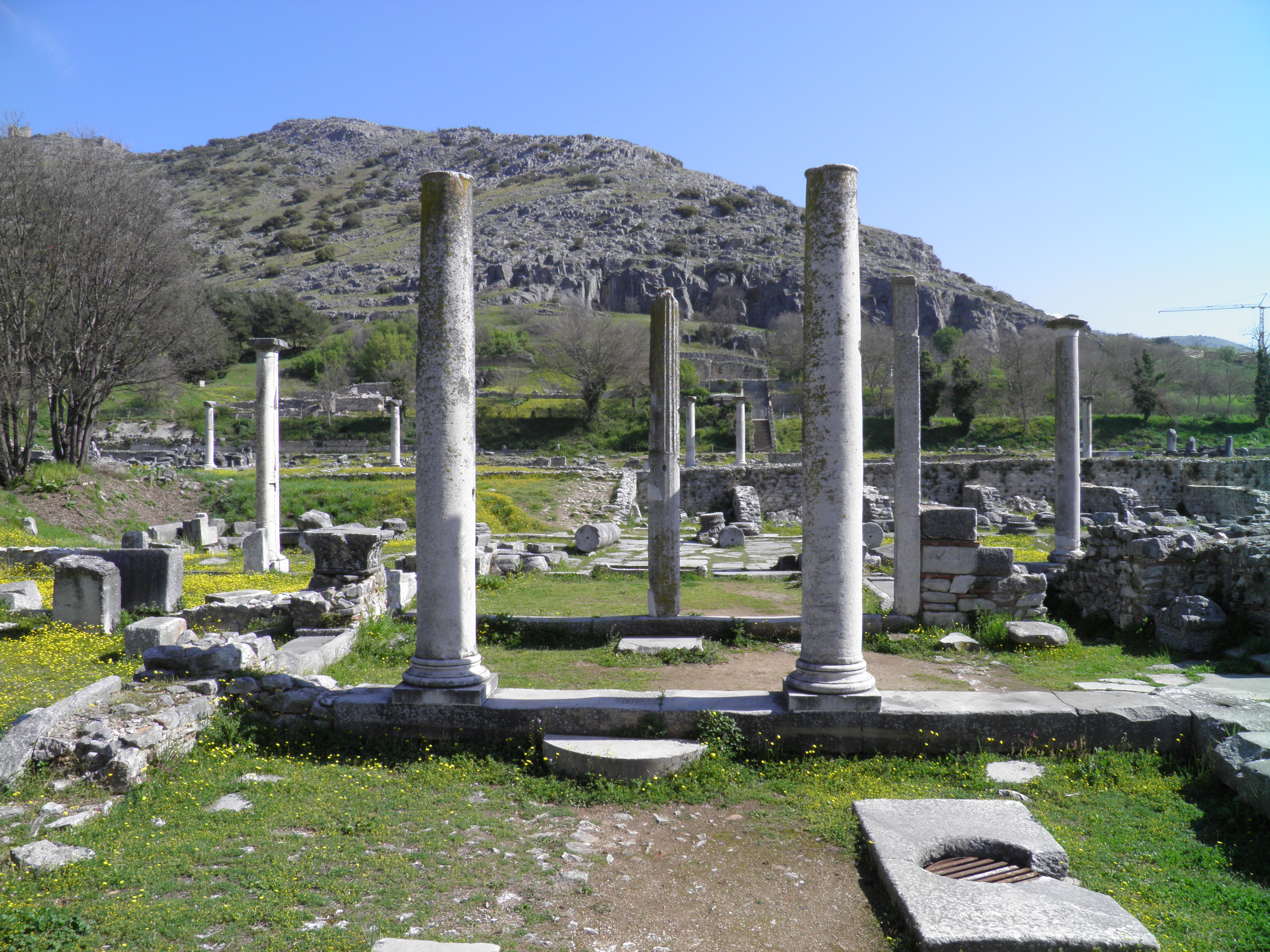
The ancient Roman forum of Philippi, where the first competitions took place.

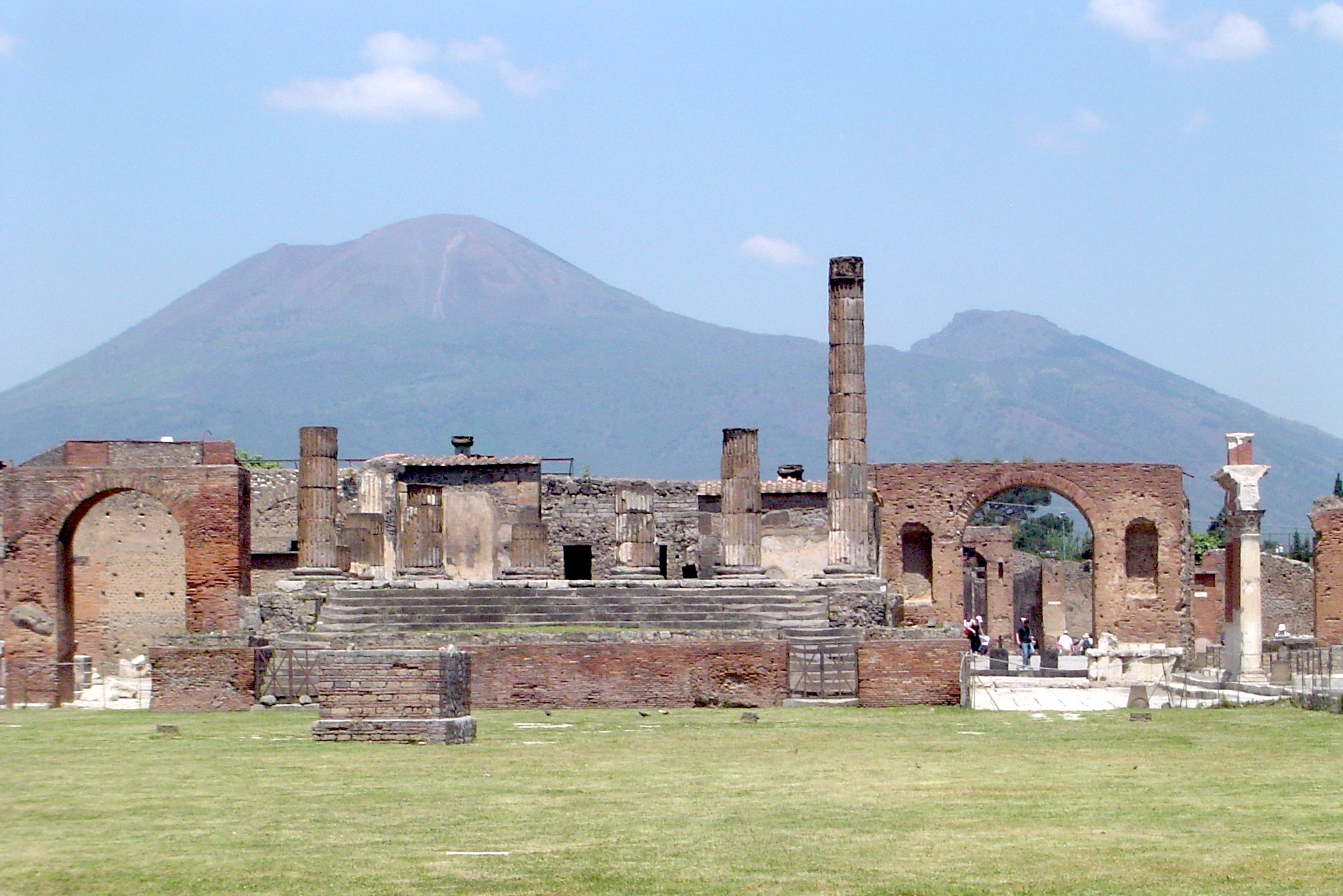
In 2015, the eighth competition was held directly in the archaeological site of Pompeii in the Bay of Naples.

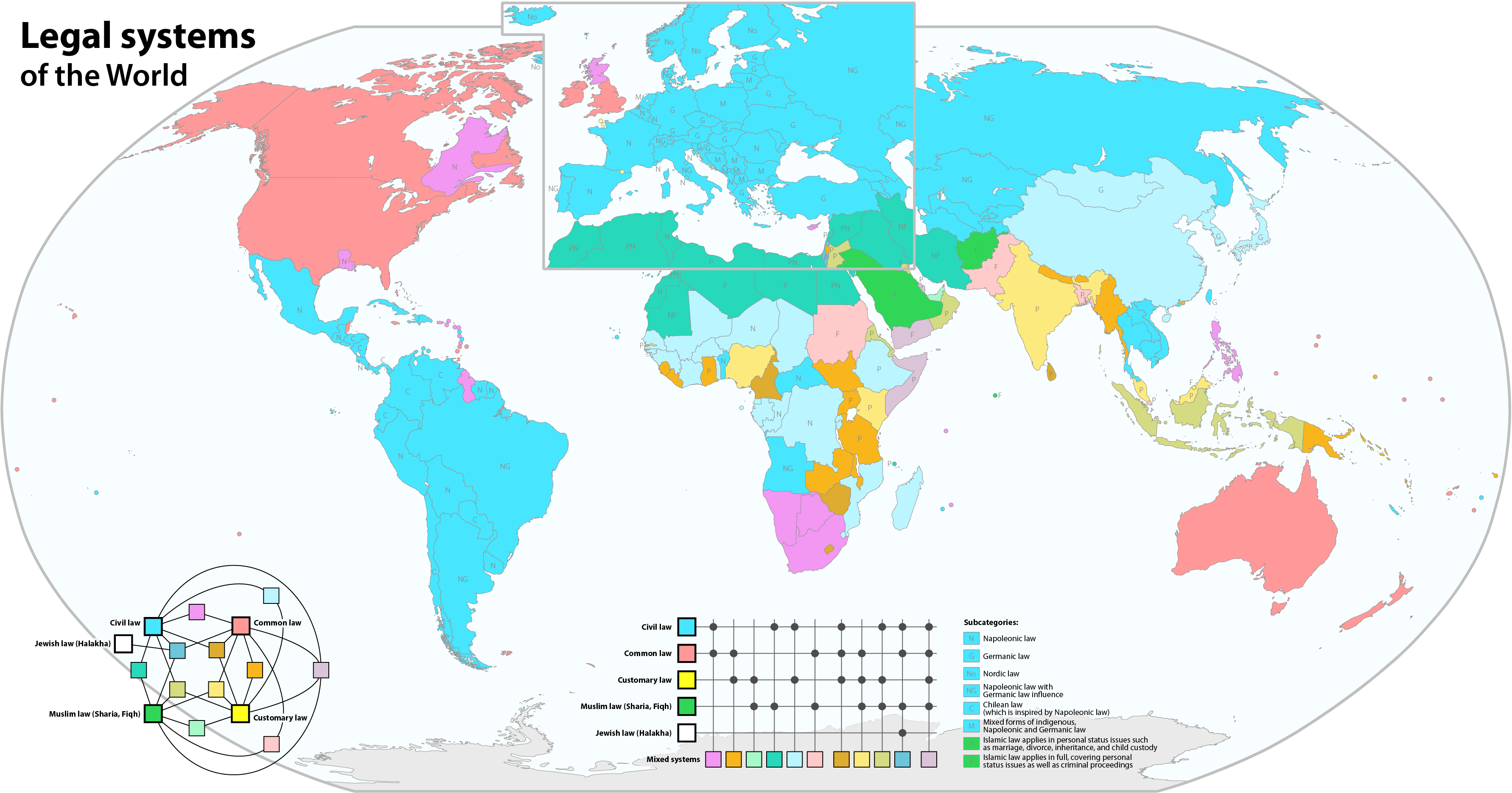
Legal systems of the world. Blue is based on Roman law.

The International Roman Law Moot Court (IRLMC) is an international European annual moot court competition in Roman law.

Participating universities are the University of Oxford, the University of Cambridge, the University of Naples Federico II, the University of Vienna, the Eberhard Karls University of Tübingen, the University of Liège, the University of Trier and the National and Kapodistrian University of Athens.

== History and process ==
The first five competitions from 2008 to 2012 were organized under the auspices of the Mohamed Ali Institute for the Study of Eastern Tradition (IMARET). This non-governmental organization dedicated to promoting the common heritage of the Mediterranean countries is based in Kavala in northern Greece and is now known as the MOHA Research Center. Since then, the University of Cambridge has taken over the organization and management.

Various preliminary rounds must be completed by the students in order to be selected for the competing team of the participating university. The initial case for the competition typically falls during the reign of Emperor Justinian the Great (527-565 AD). The competition itself initially consists of a group phase. The advanced rounds then consist of two semi-finals, a small final and a large final. Three judges work in all rounds, with the exception of the Grand Final, where five judges sit on the bench. Past judges include Melchior Wathelet (First Advocate General and former judge of the ECJ) and Johannes Schnizer (judge at the Austrian Constitutional Court). As with any moot court, the aim is to take on the role of the plaintiff and the defendant in the fictitious legal dispute and to convince the court of its own point of view. A session lasts approximately forty minutes. The entire process is oral, so no briefs are drawn up and will be held in English. The aim is to convince the judges with Roman legal principles, modern English rhetoric, modern legal advocacy skills and modern negotiating tactics.

The winning team in the grand finale will receive the Palma Victoriae, while the second-placed team will receive the Palma Secunda and the winning team in the small final will receive the Palma Tertia. The Palma Optimi Oratoris is awarded for the best speaker.

The first five competitions between 2008 and 2012 were held in Greece. The small and big finals took place in the Justinian Forum at the Philippi archaeological site. The competition has already taken place in the excavations of Pompeii, the Ely Cathedral and the Electoral Palace in Trier. The annual competition is organized alternately by one of the participating universities in the later years. The Moot Court takes place in a different location every year, such as Trier in 2017, Liège in 2018 (Heidberg Monastery) and Cambridge in 2019. The team from Cambridge won the competition in 2020 ahead of the team from Vienna. The competition in 2021 took place online with Oxford University winning.

The aim of this competition is, on the one hand, to give the best students at their university the opportunity to demonstrate their skills internationally, to make international contacts and, on the other hand, to have a scientific and cultural connection between nations. This is also because Roman law was not only in force for centuries in many of today's states (or predecessor states such as the Byzantine Empire and the Holy Roman Empire), but also forms the basis of many of today's state legal systems worldwide. Roman law was studied even in China to draft the civil code. Furthermore, the Napoleonic Code, which today forms the basis of many legal systems, is based on a mixture of Droit Coutumier, natural law and Roman law. The Habsburg Civil Code (ABGB) of 1812 has roots in part in Roman law and has been received several times, such as in Liechtenstein, Czechoslovakia, Serbia, Bosnia, Slovenia, Croatia and Romania. The current German and Swiss civil codes are based on Roman law and were themselves models for codifications such as those in Turkey, Thailand, Japan and Korea.

Since the competition was founded, the focus has also been on the participants' intercultural competence and the corresponding negotiating tactics. In addition to the serious competitions, students, professors, organizers and sponsors of the Moot traditionally have the opportunity to exchange ideas socially and intellectually with colleagues from different legal traditions and countries during the additional cultural program. Greek students have also received an honorary diploma from the President of the Republic of Greece for successful participation in the IRLMC.

The International Roman Law Moot Court is the model for Moot Courts on historical law such as the "Ius Commune MC - The Imperial Aulic Council" and the "Historical Jewish Law MC - The Rabbinic Tribunal of Prague".

There are numerous national Roman law competitions and moot courts. The concept of the International Roman Law Moot Court was awarded the UNIVIE Teaching Award by the University of Vienna in 2018 and the IRLMC is considered to be the world's most important competition in Roman law.

== Competitions ==
Year	Competition	First Place / Palma Victoriae (win number)	Second Place / Palma Secunda (win number)	Third Place / Palma Tertia (win number)	Location
2008	First IRLM	University of Oxford (1)	—	—	Kavala, Greece
2009	Second IRLM	University of Trier (1)	Eberhard Karls University of Tübingen (1)	—	Kavala, Greece
2010	Third IRLM	National and Kapodistrian University of Athens (1)	University of Vienna (1)	University of Oxford (1)	Kavala, Greece
2011	Fourth IRLM	University of Cambridge (1)	University of Oxford (1)	University of Liège (1)	Kavala, Greece
2012	Fifth IRLM	University of Trier (2)	National and Kapodistrian University of Athens (1)	University of Naples Federico II (1)	Kavala, Greece
2013	Sixth IRLM	National and Kapodistrian University of Athens (2)	University of Oxford (2)	University of Cambridge (1)	Oxford, United Kingdom
2014	Seventh IRLM	University of Vienna (1)	National and Kapodistrian University of Athens (2)	Eberhard Karls University of Tübingen (1)	Oxford, United Kingdom
2015	Eighth IRLM	University of Naples Federico II (1)	University of Cambridge (1)	National and Kapodistrian University of Athens (1)	Naples, Pompeii, Italy
2016	Ninth IRLM	Eberhard Karls University of Tübingen (1)	University of Cambridge (2)	University of Oxford (2)	Vienna, Austria
2017	Tenth IRLM	Eberhard Karls University of Tübingen (2)	University of Cambridge (3)	University of Oxford (3)	Trier, Germany
2018	Eleventh IRLM	University of Oxford (2)	University of Liège (1)	National and Kapodistrian University of Athens (2)	Eupen, Belgium
2019	Twelfth IRLM	University of Liège (1)	University of Oxford (3)	University of Vienna (1)	Cambridge, Ely, United Kingdom
2020	Thirteenth IRLM	University of Cambridge (2)	University of Vienna (2)	University of Liège (1)	Online
2021	Fourteenth IRLM	University of Oxford (3)	University of Naples Federico II (1)	University of Liège (2)	Online
2022	Fifteenth IRLM	Eberhard Karls University of Tübingen (3)	University of Cambridge (4)	National and Kapodistrian University of Athens (3)	Athens, Greece
2025	Nineteenth IRLM	University of Oxford (4)	National and Kapodistrian University of Athens (3)	University of Cambridge (4)	Oxford, United Kingdom

== See also ==
- Mock trial
- Law
- Philip C. Jessup International Law Moot Court Competition
- Price Media Law Moot Court Competition
