= Sexuality in ancient Rome =

Attitudes and behaviors towards sex in ancient Rome

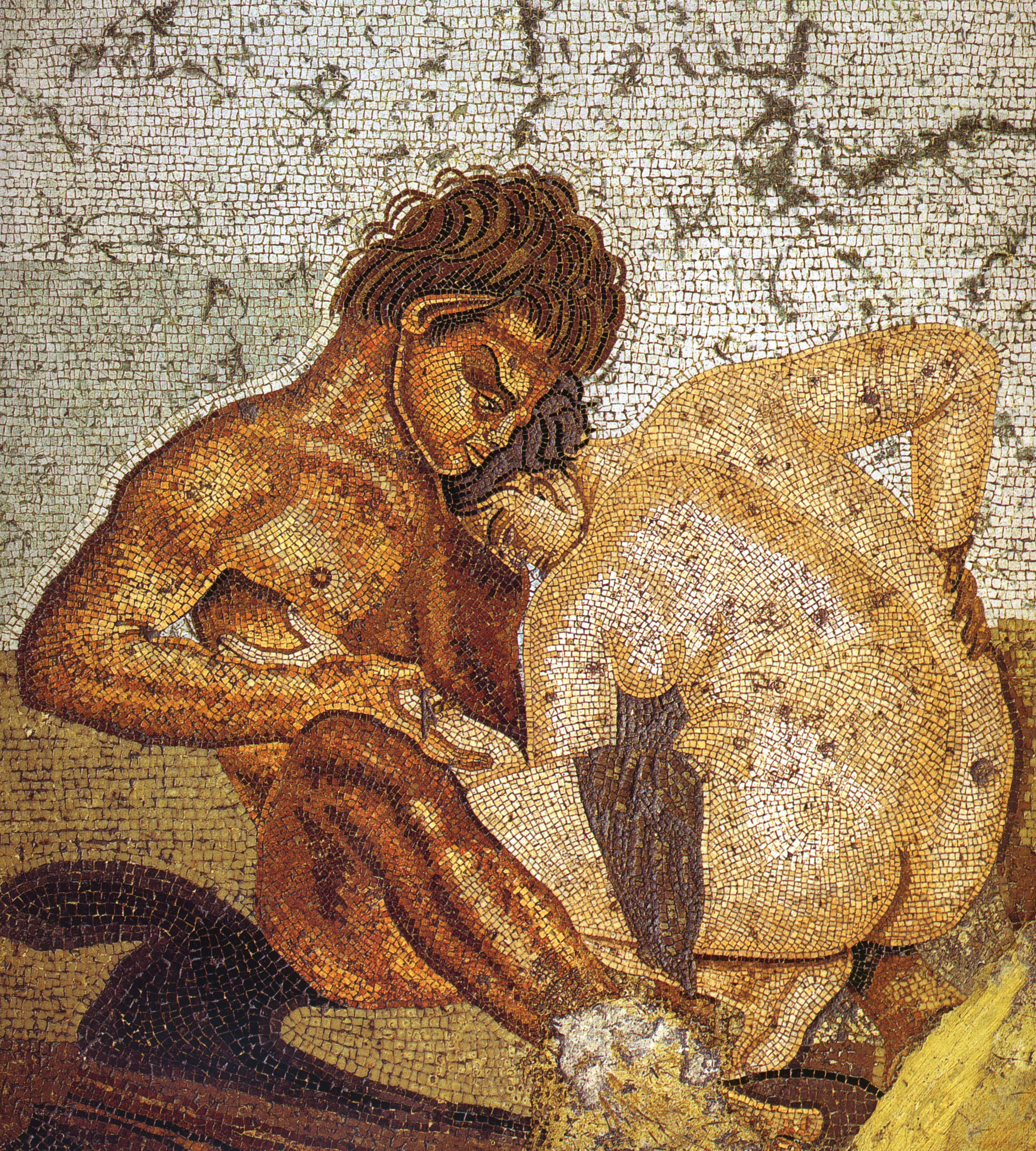
Satyr and nymph, mythological symbols of sexuality for their respective sexes, on a mosaic from a bedroom in Pompeii.

Sexual attitudes and behaviors in ancient Rome are indicated by art, literature, and inscriptions, and to a lesser extent by archaeological remains such as erotic artifacts and architecture. It has sometimes been assumed that "unlimited sexual license" was characteristic of ancient Rome, but sexuality was not excluded as a concern of the mos maiorum, the traditional social norms that affected public, private, and military life. Pudor, "shame, modesty", was a regulating factor in behavior, as were legal strictures on certain sexual transgressions in both the Republican and Imperial periods. The censors—public officials who determined the social rank of individuals—had the power to remove citizens from the senatorial or equestrian order for sexual misconduct, and on occasion did so.

Roman society was patriarchal (see paterfamilias), and masculinity was premised on a capacity for governing oneself and others of lower status, not only in war and politics, but also in sexual relations. Virtus, "virtue", was an active masculine ideal of self-discipline, related to the Latin word for "man", vir. However, vir more so encompassed the ideal rather than actual biological gender, meaning the ideals of a 'man' could be reached by anyone (with extreme rare cases).

The corresponding ideal for a woman was pudicitia, often translated as chastity or modesty, but it was a more positive and even competitive personal quality that displayed both her attractiveness and self-control. Roman women of the upper classes were expected to be well educated, strong of character, and active in maintaining their family's standing in society. With extremely few exceptions, surviving Latin literature preserves the voices of educated male Romans on sexuality. Visual art was created by those of lower social status and of a greater range of ethnicity, but was tailored to the taste and inclinations of those wealthy enough to afford it, including, in the Imperial era, former slaves.

Some sexual attitudes and behaviors in ancient Roman culture differ markedly from those in later Western societies. Roman religion promoted sexuality as an aspect of prosperity for the state, and individuals might turn to private religious practice or "magic" for improving their erotic lives or reproductive health. Prostitution was legal, public, and widespread. "Pornographic" paintings were featured among the art collections in respectable upperclass households. "Homosexual" and "heterosexual" did not form the primary dichotomy of Roman thinking about sexuality, and no Latin words for these concepts exist. Sexual relations of a man with either women or men of inferior status seems to have been generally tolerated, as long as his behaviors revealed no weaknesses or excesses, nor infringed on the rights and prerogatives of his masculine peers. While perceived effeminacy was denounced, especially in political rhetoric, sex in moderation with male prostitutes or slaves, usually documented in the form of pederasty was accepted, though not necessarily viewed as positive, so long as the male citizen took the active role and the slave or prostitute the receptive role.

A late-20th-century paradigm analyzed Roman sexuality in relation to a "penetrator–penetrated" binary model. This model, however, has limitations, especially in regard to expressions of sexuality among individual Romans. Even the relevance of the word "sexuality" to ancient Roman culture has been disputed; but in the absence of any other label for "the cultural interpretation of erotic experience", the term continues to be used.

== Erotic literature and art ==
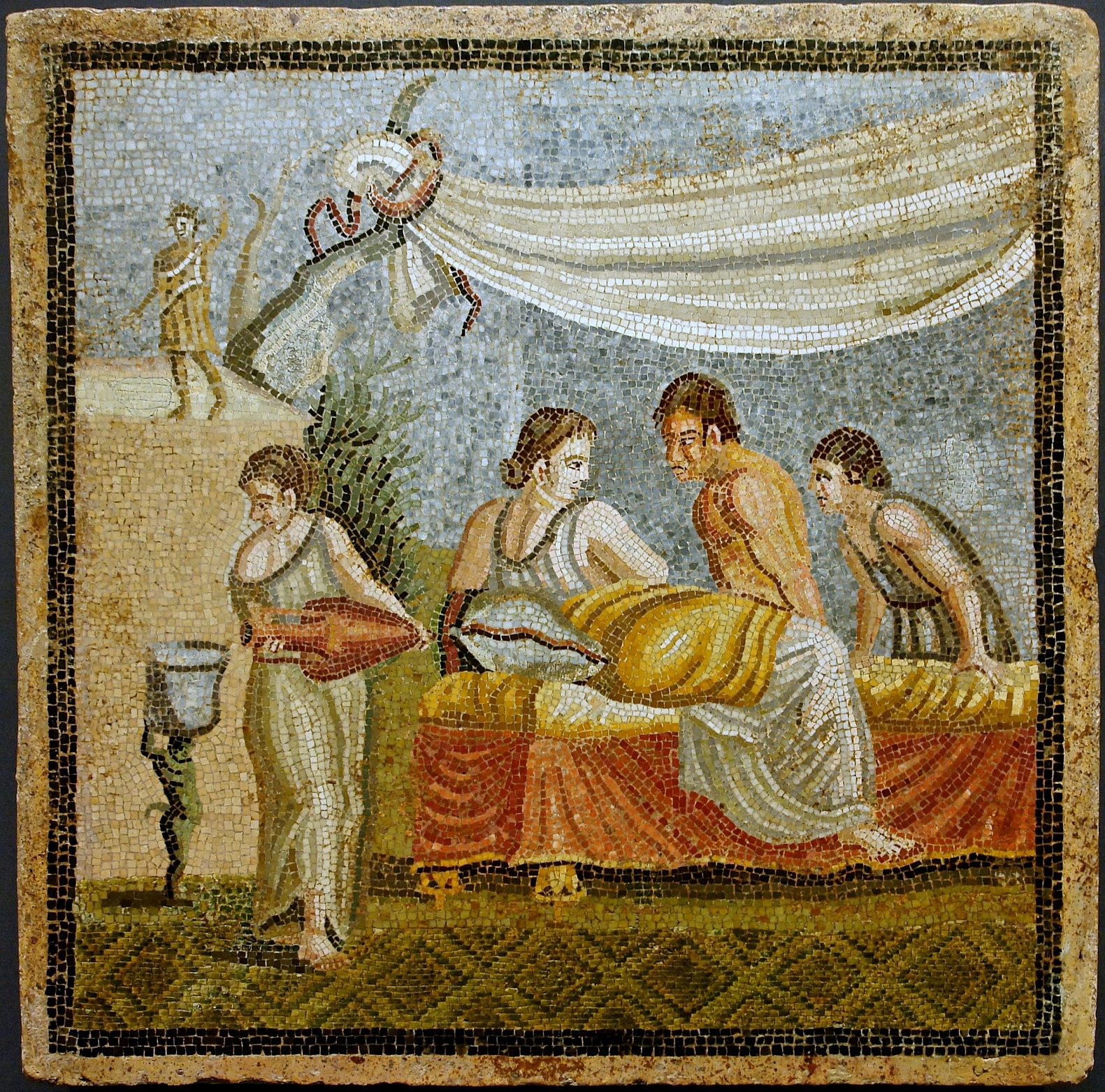
Romantic scene from a mosaic (Villa at Centocelle, Rome, 20 BC–20 AD)

Ancient literature pertaining to Roman sexuality falls mainly into four categories: legal texts; medical texts; poetry; and political discourse. Forms of expression with lower cultural cachet in antiquity—such as comedy, satire, invective, love poetry, graffiti, magic spells, inscriptions, and interior decoration—have more to say about sex than elevated genres such as epic and tragedy. Information about the sex lives of the Romans is scattered in historiography, oratory, philosophy, and writings on medicine, agriculture, and other technical topics. Legal texts point to behaviors Romans wanted to regulate or prohibit, without necessarily reflecting what people actually did or refrained from doing.

Major Latin authors whose works contribute significantly to an understanding of Roman sexuality include:

- the comic playwright Plautus (d. 184 BC), whose plots often revolve around sex comedy and young lovers kept apart by circumstances;
- the statesman and moralist Cato the Elder (d. 149 BC), who offers glimpses of sexuality at a time that later Romans regarded as having higher moral standards;
- the poet Lucretius (d. c. 55 BC), who presents an extended treatment of Epicurean sexuality in his philosophical work De rerum natura;
- Catullus (fl. 50s BC), whose poems explore a range of erotic experience near the end of the Republic, from delicate romanticism to brutally obscene invective;
- Cicero (d. 43 BC), with courtroom speeches that often attack the opposition's sexual conduct and letters peppered with gossip about Rome's elite;
- the Augustan elegists Propertius and Tibullus, who reveal social attitudes in describing love affairs with mistresses;
- Ovid (d. 17 AD), especially his Amores ("Love Affairs") and Ars Amatoria ("Art of Love"), which according to tradition contributed to Augustus's decision to exile the poet, and his epic, the Metamorphoses, which presents a range of sexuality, with an emphasis on rape, through the lens of mythology;
- the epigrammatist Martial (d. c. 102/4 AD), whose observations of society are braced by sexually explicit invective;
- the satirist Juvenal (d. early 2nd century AD), who rails against the sexual mores of his time.

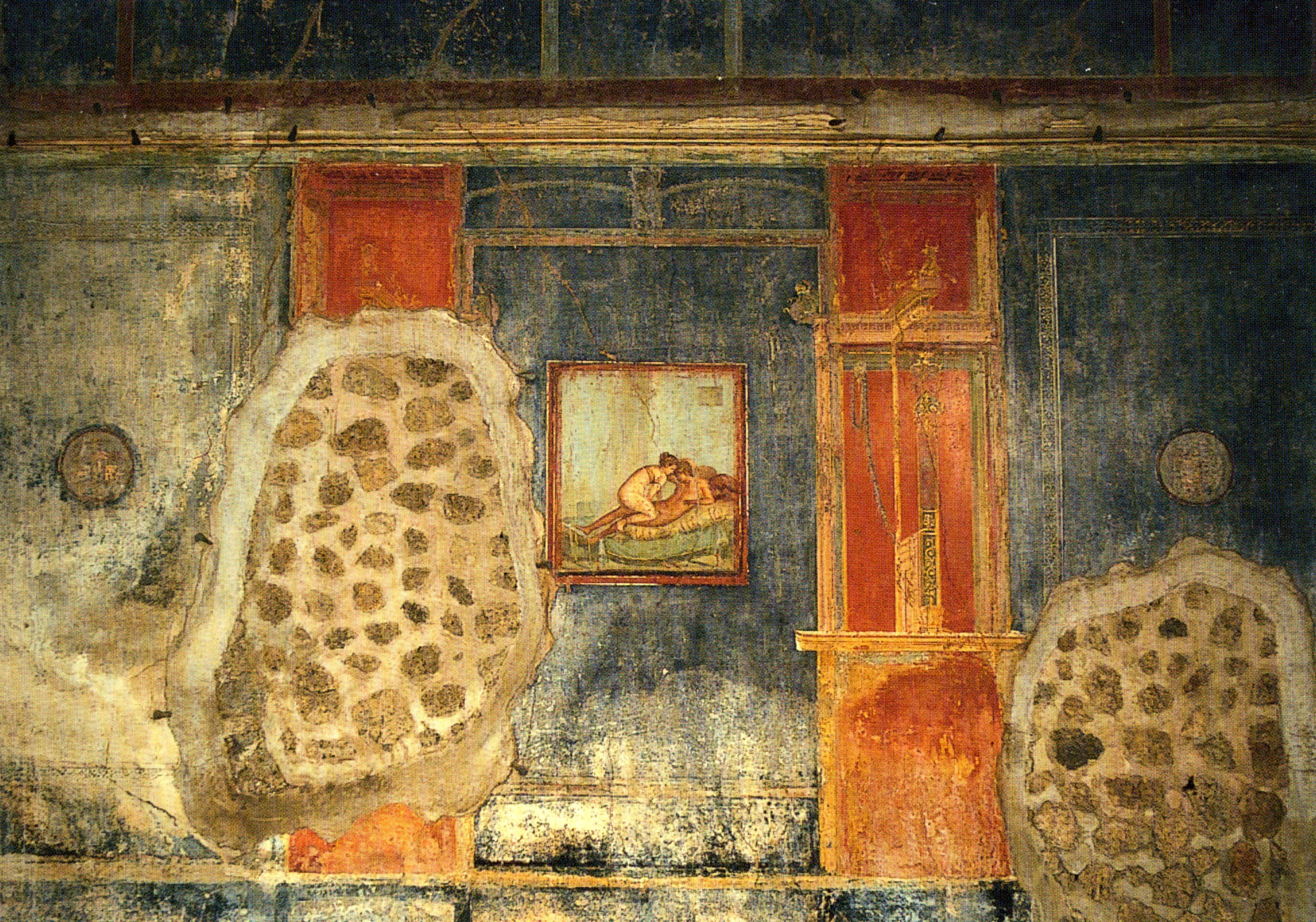
Erotic art in its architectural context at the House of the Centenary, Pompeii

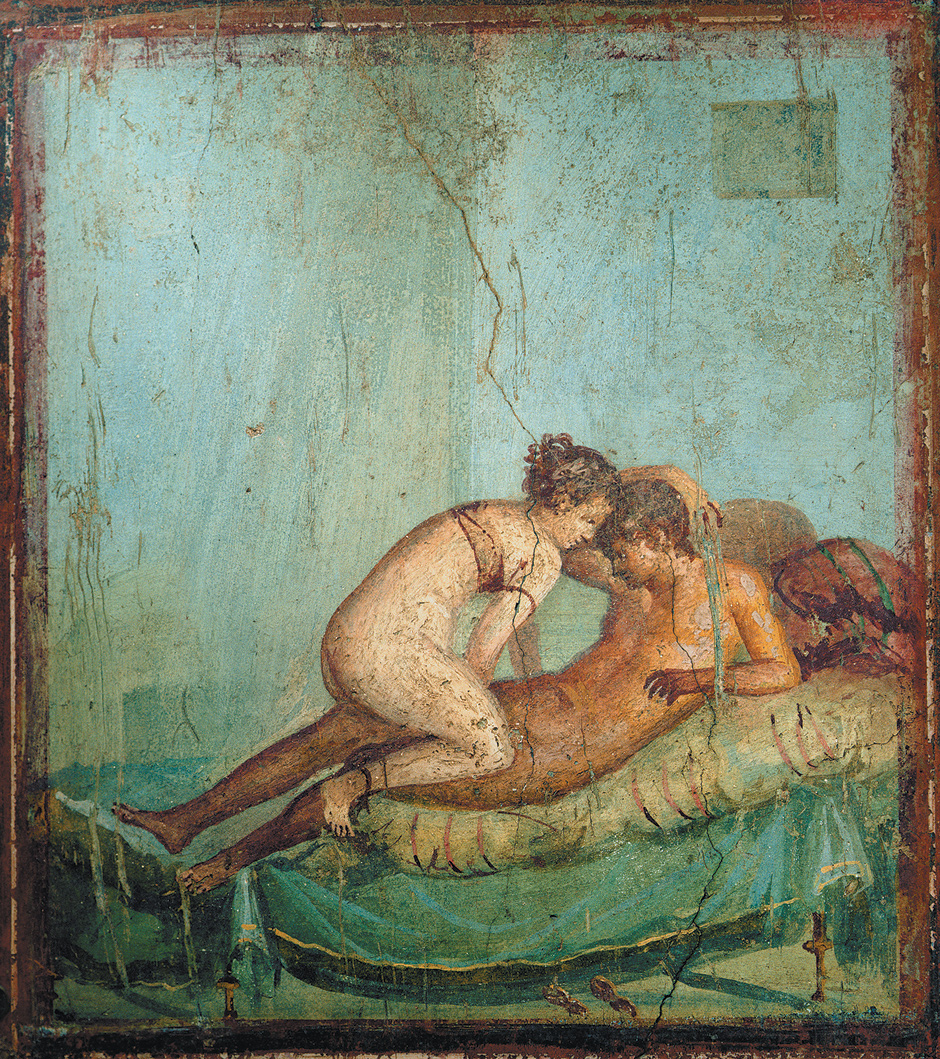
Detail of the painting

Ovid lists a number of writers known for salacious material whose works are now lost. Greek sex manuals and "straightforward pornography" were published under the name of famous heterai (courtesans), and circulated in Rome. The robustly sexual Milesiaca of Aristides was translated by Sisenna, one of the praetors of 78 BC. Ovid calls the book a collection of misdeeds (crimina), and says the narrative was laced with dirty jokes. After the Battle of Carrhae, the Parthians were reportedly shocked to find the Milesiaca in the baggage of Marcus Crassus's officers.

Erotic art, especially as preserved in Pompeii and Herculaneum, is a rich if not unambiguous source; some images contradict sexual preferences stressed in literary sources and may be intended to provoke laughter or challenge conventional attitudes. Everyday objects such as mirrors and serving vessels might be decorated with erotic scenes; on Arretine ware, these range from "elegant amorous dalliance" to explicit views of the penis entering the vagina. Erotic paintings were found in the most respectable houses of the Roman nobility, as Ovid notes:

Just as venerable figures of men, painted by the hand of an artist, are resplendent in our houses, so too there is a small painting (tabella) (Note: The tabella was a small, portable painting, as distinguished from an architecturally permanent wall painting.) in some spot which depicts various couplings and sexual positions: just as Telamonian Ajax sits with an expression that declares his anger, and the barbarian mother (Medea) has crime in her eyes, so too a wet Venus dries her dripping hair with her fingers and is viewed barely covered by the maternal waters.

The pornographic tabella and the erotically charged Venus appear among various images that a connoisseur of art might enjoy. A series of paintings from the Suburban Baths at Pompeii, discovered in 1986 and published in 1995, presents erotic scenarios that seem intended "to amuse the viewer with outrageous sexual spectacle," including a variety of positions, oral sex, and group sex featuring male–female, male–male, and female–female relations.

In the 2nd century AD, "there is a boom in texts about sex in Greek and Latin," along with romance novels. But frank sexuality all but disappears from literature thereafter, and sexual topics are reserved for medical writing or Christian theology.

== Sex, religion, and the state ==
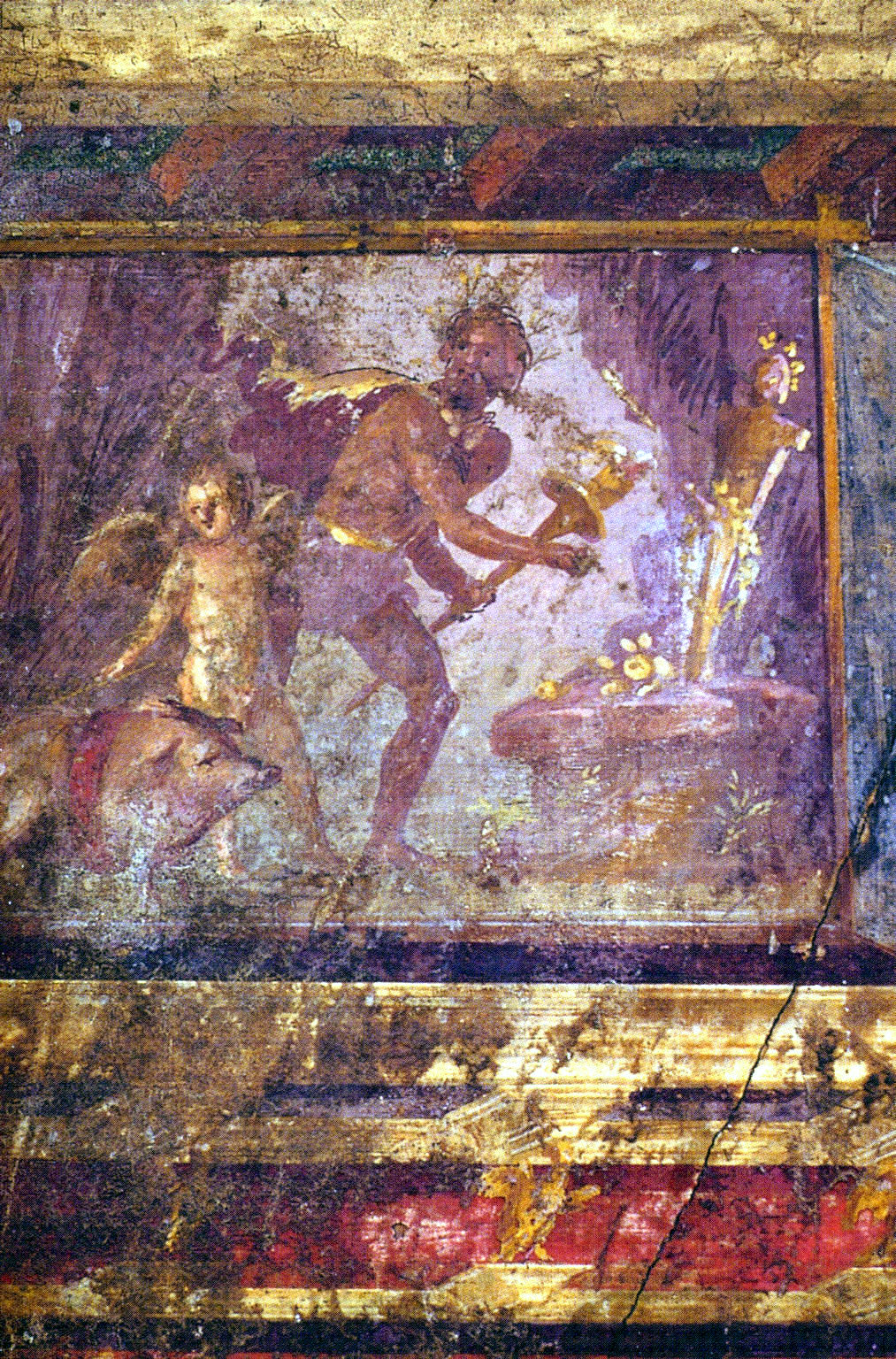
A man prepares the nocturnal sacrifice of a pig to Priapus, with Cupid as the swineherd (wall painting, Villa of the Mysteries)

Like other aspects of Roman life, sexuality was supported and regulated by religious traditions, both the public cult of the state and private religious practices and magic. Sexuality was an important category of Roman religious thought. The complement of male and female was vital to the Roman concept of deity. The Dii Consentes were a council of deities in male–female pairs, to some extent Rome's equivalent to the Twelve Olympians of the Greeks. At least two state priesthoods were held jointly by a married couple. (Note: See Flamen Dialis and rex sacrorum.) The Vestal Virgins, the one state priesthood reserved for women, took a vow of chastity that granted them relative independence from male control; among the religious objects in their keeping was a sacred phallus: "Vesta's fire ... evoked the idea of sexual purity in the female" and "represented the procreative power of the male". The men who served in the various colleges of priests were expected to marry and have families. Cicero held that the desire (libido) to procreate was "the seedbed of the republic", as it was the cause for the first form of social institution, marriage. Marriage produced children and in turn a "house" (domus) for family unity that was the building block of urban life.

Many Roman religious festivals had an element of sexuality. The February Lupercalia, celebrated as late as the 5th century of the Christian era, included an archaic fertility rite. The Floralia featured nude dancing. At certain religious festivals throughout April, prostitutes participated or were officially recognized. Cupid inspired desire; the imported god Priapus represented gross or humorous lust; Mutunus Tutunus promoted marital sex. The god Liber (understood as the "Free One") oversaw physiological responses during sexual intercourse. When a male assumed the toga virilis, "toga of manhood," Liber became his patron; according to the love poets, he left behind the innocent modesty (pudor) of childhood and acquired the sexual freedom (libertas) to begin his course of love. A host of deities oversaw every aspect of intercourse, conception, and childbirth.

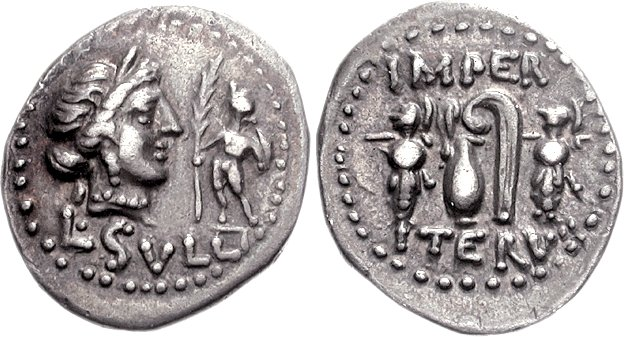
Denarius issued ca. 84–83 BC under Sulla picturing Venus with a diadem and a standing Cupid with a palm branch, and on the reverse two military trophies and religious implements (jug and lituus)

The connections among human reproduction, general prosperity, and the wellbeing of the state are embodied by the Roman cult of Venus, who differs from her Greek counterpart Aphrodite in her role as a mother of the Roman people through her half-mortal son Aeneas. The fascinum, a phallic charm, was ubiquitous in Roman culture, appearing on everything from jewelry to bells and wind chimes to lamps, including as an amulet to protect children and triumphing generals.

Classical myths often deal with sexual themes such as gender identity, adultery, incest, and rape. Roman art and literature continued the Hellenistic treatment of mythological figures having sex as humanly erotic and at times humorous, often removed from the religious dimension.

=== Moral and legal concepts ===
==== Castitas ====
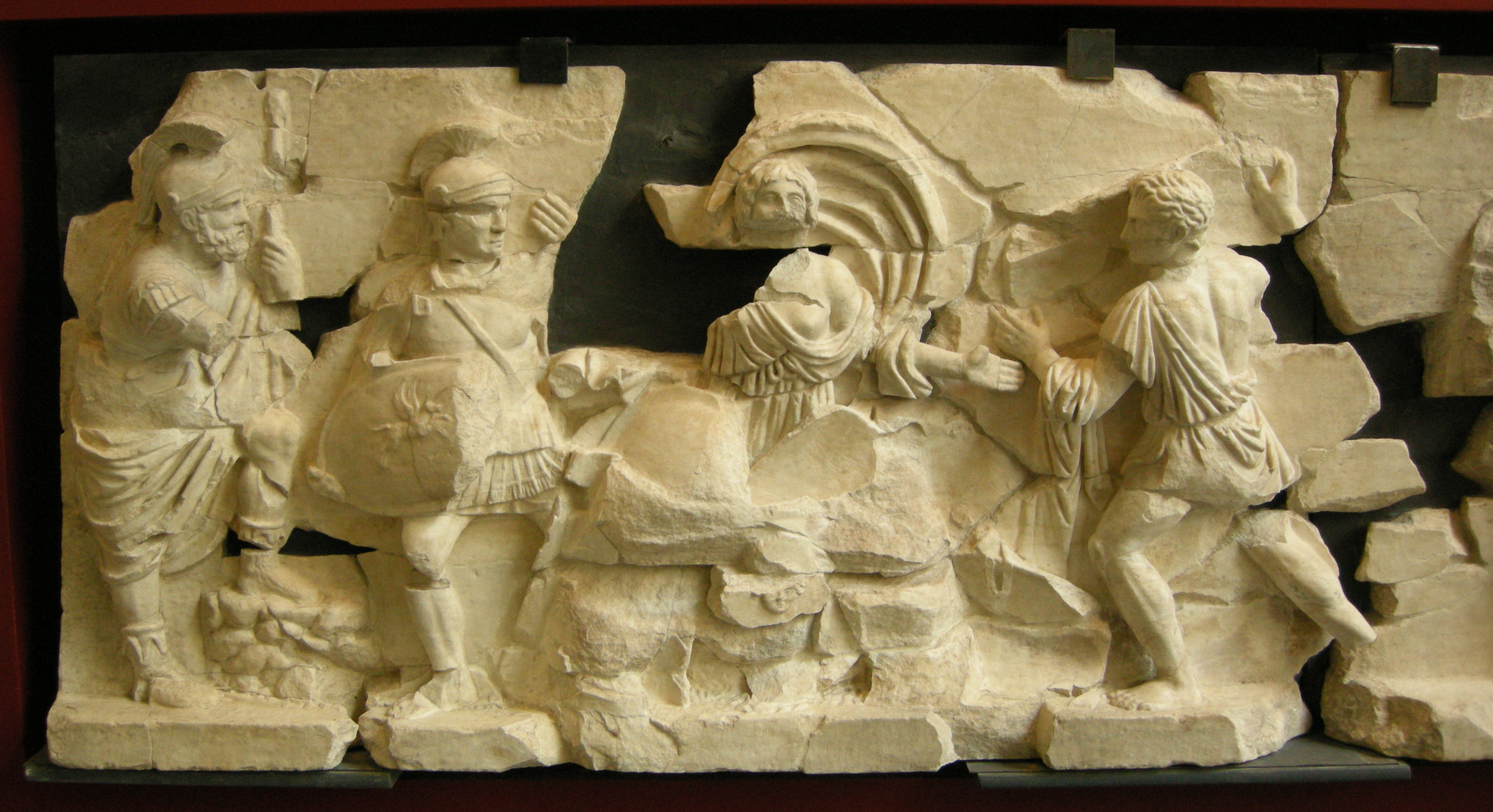
Fragmentary Augustan-era relief depicting the punishment of Tarpeia, a Vestal who in Roman legend broke her vows and betrayed her country by consorting with the enemy

The Latin word castitas, from which the English "chastity" derives, is an abstract noun denoting "a moral and physical purity usually in a specifically religious context", sometimes but not always referring to sexual chastity. The related adjective castus (feminine casta, neuter castum), "pure", can be used of places and objects as well as people; the adjective pudicus ("chaste, modest") describes more specifically a person who is sexually moral. The goddess Ceres was concerned with both ritual and sexual castitas, and the torch carried in her honor as part of the Roman wedding procession was associated with the bride's purity; Ceres also embodied motherhood. The goddess Vesta was the primary deity of the Roman pantheon associated with castitas, and a virgin goddess herself; her priestesses the Vestals were virgins who took a vow to remain celibate.

==== Incestum ====
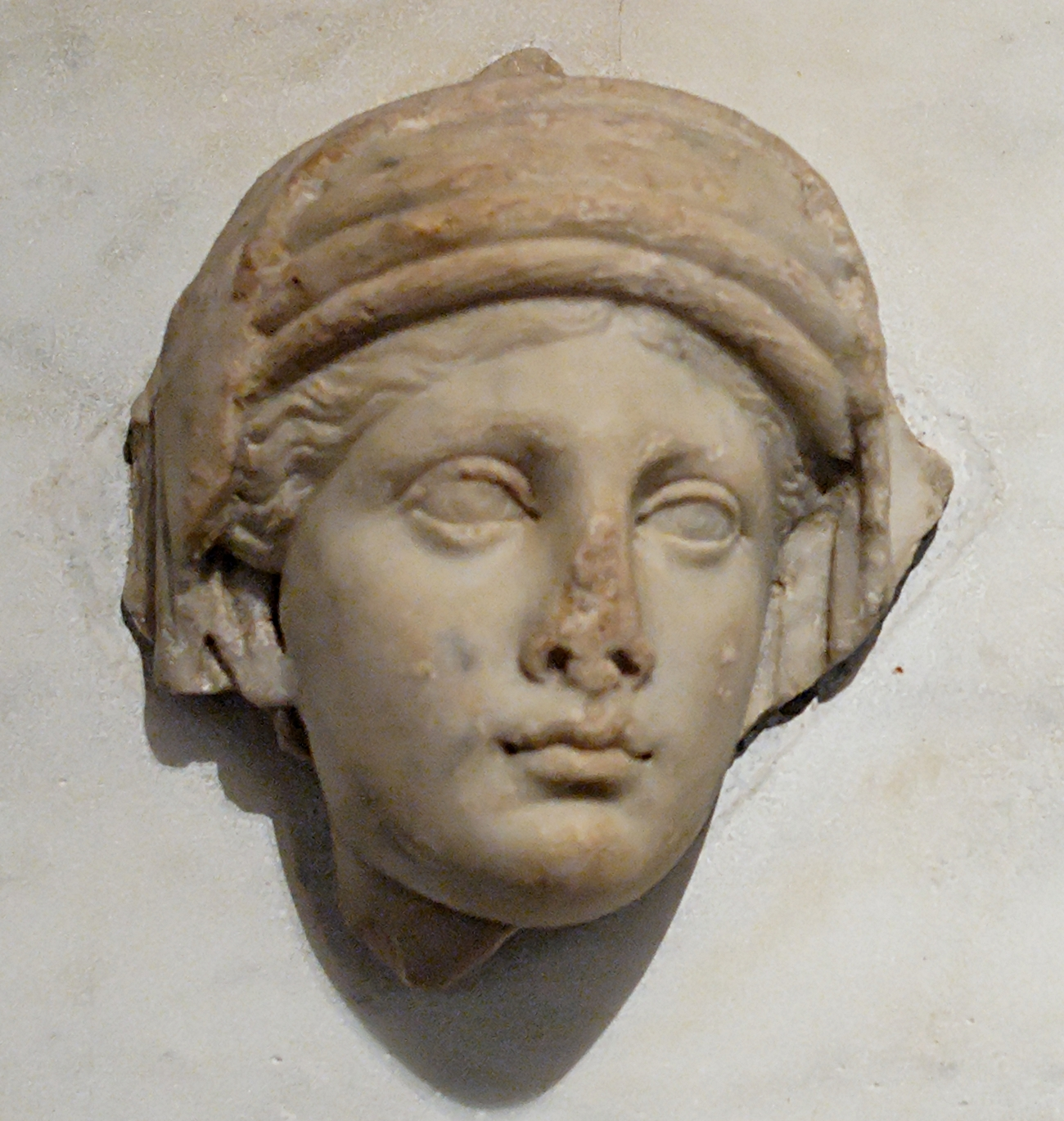
Vestal from the time of Hadrian, fragment of a marble relief from the Palatine, Rome

Incestum (that which is "not castum") is an act that violates religious purity. The violation of a Vestal's vow of chastity was incestum, a legal charge brought against her and the man who rendered her impure through sexual relations, whether consensually or by force. A Vestal's loss of castitas ruptured Rome's treaty with the gods (pax deorum), and was typically accompanied by the observation of bad omens (prodigia). Prosecutions for incestum involving a Vestal often coincided with political unrest, and some charges of incestum seem politically motivated; for example, Marcus Crassus was acquitted of incestum with a Vestal who shared his family name. (Note: Crassus's nomen was Licinius; the Vestal's name was Licinia (see Roman naming conventions). His reputation for greed and sharp business dealings helped save him; he objected that he had spent time with Licinia to obtain some real estate she owned. For sources, see Michael C. Alexander, Trials in the Late Roman Republic, 149 BC to 50 BC (University of Toronto Press, 1990), p. 84. The most likely year was 73 BC; Plutarch, Life of Crassus 1.2, implies that the prosecution was motivated by political utility. One or more Vestals were also brought before the College of Pontiffs for incestum in connection with the Catiline Conspiracy (Alexander, Trials, p. 83).) In 114 BC three Vestals were convicted for having sex with several men of the governing class, in the wake of which a temple to Venus Verticordia was founded.

Although the English word "incest" derives from the Latin, incestuous relations are only one form of Roman incestum, sometimes translated as "sacrilege". When Clodius Pulcher dressed as a woman and intruded on the all-female rites of the Bona Dea, he was charged with incestum.

==== Stuprum ====
In Latin legal and moral discourse, stuprum is illicit sexual intercourse, translatable as "criminal debauchery" or "sex crime". Stuprum encompasses diverse sexual offenses including incestum, rape ("unlawful sex by force"), and adultery. In early Rome, stuprum was a disgraceful act in general, or any public disgrace, including but not limited to illicit sex. (Note: For instance, in the mid-3rd century BC, Naevius uses the word stuprum in his Bellum Punicum for the military disgrace of desertion or cowardice; Fantham, p. 117.) By the time of the comic playwright Plautus (ca. 254–184 BC) it had acquired its more restricted sexual meaning. Stuprum can occur only among citizens; protection from sexual misconduct was among the legal rights that distinguished the citizen from the non-citizen. Although the noun stuprum may be translated into English as fornication, the intransitive verb "to fornicate" is an inadequate translation of the Latin stuprare, which is a transitive verb requiring a direct object (the person who is the target of the misconduct) and a male agent (the stuprator).

==== Raptus ====
The English word "rape" derives ultimately from the Latin verb rapio, rapere, raptus, "to snatch, carry away, abduct" (cf. English rapt, rapture, and raptor). In Roman law, raptus or raptio meant primarily kidnapping or abduction; the mythological rape of the Sabine women is a form of bride abduction in which sexual violation is a secondary issue. The "abduction" of an unmarried girl from her father's household at times might be a matter of the couple eloping without her father's permission to marry. Rape in the English sense was more often expressed as stuprum committed through violence or coercion (cum vi or per vim). As laws pertaining to violence were codified toward the end of the Republic, raptus ad stuprum, "abduction for the purpose of committing a sex crime", emerged as a legal distinction. (See further discussion of rape under "The rape of men" and "Rape and the law" below.)

=== Healing and magic ===
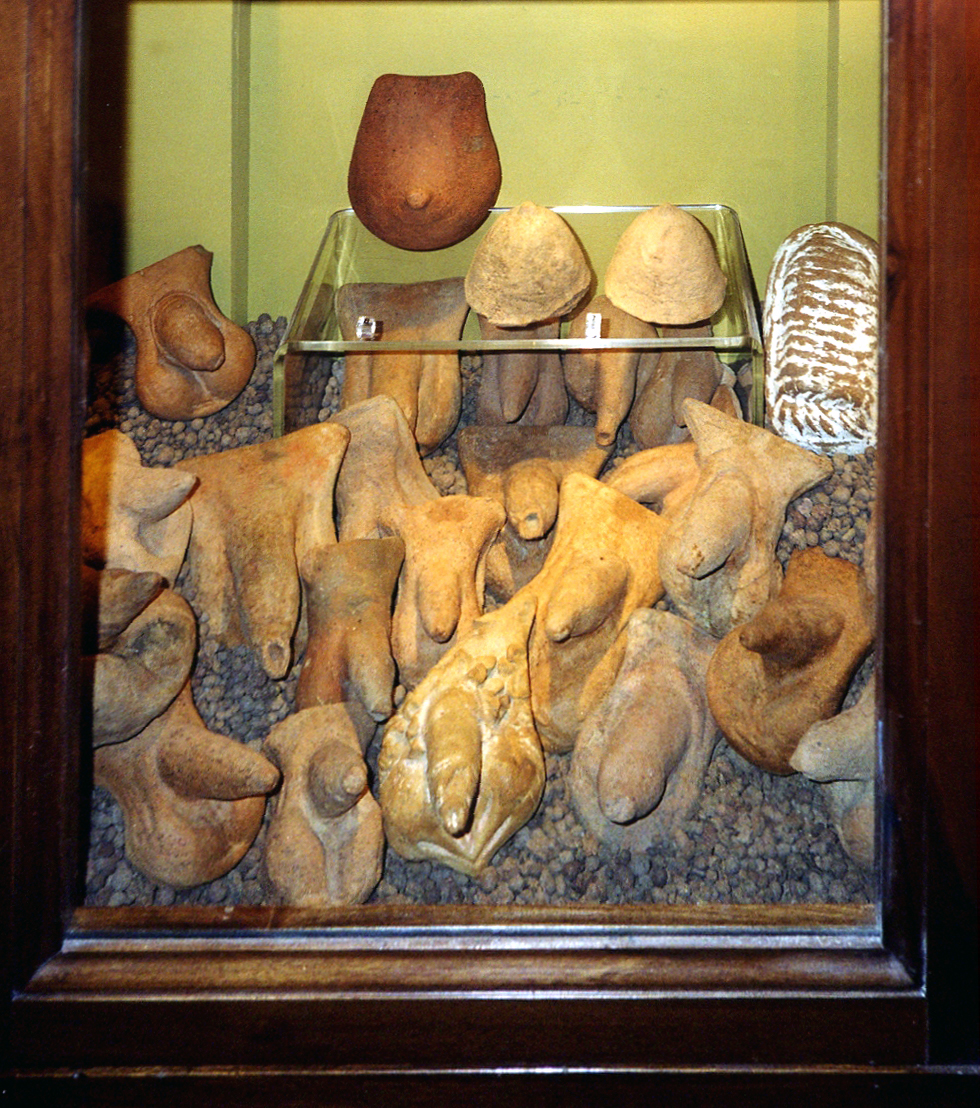
Votive offerings from Pompeii representing breasts, penises, and a uterus

Divine aid might be sought in private religious rituals along with medical treatments to enhance or block fertility, or to cure diseases of the reproductive organs. Votive offerings (vota; compare ex-voto) in the form of breasts and penises have been found at healing sanctuaries.

A private ritual under some circumstances might be considered "magic", an indistinct category in antiquity. An amatorium (Greek philtron) was a love charm or potion; binding spells (defixiones) were supposed to "fix" a person's sexual affection. The Greek Magical Papyri, a collection of syncretic magic texts, contain many love spells that indicate "there was a very lively market in erotic magic in the Roman period", catered by freelance priests who at times claimed to derive their authority from the Egyptian religious tradition. Canidia, a witch described by Horace, performs a spell using a female effigy to dominate a smaller male doll.

Aphrodisiacs, anaphrodisiacs, contraceptives, and abortifacients are preserved by both medical handbooks and magic texts; potions can be difficult to distinguish from pharmacology. In his Book 33 De medicamentis, Marcellus of Bordeaux, a contemporary of Ausonius, collected more than 70 sexually related treatments—for growths and lesions on the testicles and penis, undescended testicles, erectile dysfunction, hydrocele, "creating a eunuch without surgery", ensuring a woman's fidelity, and compelling or diminishing a man's desire—some of which involve ritual procedures.

Marcellus also records which herbs could be used to induce menstruation, or to purge the womb after childbirth or abortion; these herbs include potential abortifacients and may have been used as such. Other sources advise remedies such as coating the penis with a mixture of honey and pepper to get an erection, or boiling an ass' genitals in oil as an ointment.

== Theories of sexuality ==
Ancient theories of sexuality were produced by and for an educated elite. The extent to which theorizing about sex actually affected behavior is debatable, even among those who were attentive to the philosophical and medical writings that presented such views. This elite discourse, while often deliberately critical of common or typical behaviors, at the same time cannot be assumed to exclude values broadly held within the society.

=== Epicurean sexuality ===
"Nor does he who avoids love lack the fruit of Venus but rather chooses goods which are without a penalty; for certainly the pleasure from this is more pure for the healthy than for the wretched. For indeed, at the very moment of possession, the hot passion of lovers fluctuates with uncertain wanderings and they are undecided what to enjoy first with eyes and hands. They tightly press what they have sought and cause bodily pain, and often drive their teeth into little lips and give crushing kisses, because the pleasure is not pure and there are goads underneath which prod them to hurt that very thing, whatever it is, from which those [torments] of frenzy spring."

— Lucretius, De rerum natura 4.1073–1085

The fourth book of Lucretius' De rerum natura provides one of the most extended passages on human sexuality in Latin literature. Yeats, describing the translation by Dryden, called it "the finest description of sexual intercourse ever written." Lucretius was the contemporary of Catullus and Cicero in the mid-1st century BC. His didactic poem De rerum natura is a presentation of Epicurean philosophy within the Ennian epic tradition of Latin poetry. Epicureanism is both materialist and hedonic. The highest good is pleasure, defined as the absence of physical pain and emotional distress. The Epicurean seeks to gratify his desires with the least expenditure of passion and effort. Desires are ranked as those that are both natural and necessary, such as hunger and thirst; those that are natural but unnecessary, such as sex; and those that are neither natural nor necessary, including the desire to rule over others and glorify oneself. It is within this context that Lucretius presents his analysis of love and sexual desire, which counters the erotic ethos of Catullus and influenced the love poets of the Augustan period.

Lucretius treats male desire, female sexual pleasure, heredity, and infertility as aspects of sexual physiology. In the Epicurean view, sexuality arises from impersonal physical causes without divine or supernatural influence. The onset of physical maturity generates semen, and wet dreams occur as the sexual instinct develops. Lucretius treats the human sex drive as muta cupido, "dumb desire", comparing the physiological response of ejaculation to the blood spurting from a wound. Love (amor) is merely an elaborate cultural posturing that obscures a glandular condition; love taints sexual pleasure just as life is tainted by the fear of death. Lucretius is writing primarily for a male audience, and assumes that love is a male passion, directed at either boys or women. Male desire is viewed as pathological, frustrating, and violent. Female desire is an act on a purely animal instinct toward affection, which leads to mutual satisfaction. The comparison with female animals in heat is meant not as an insult, though there are a few traces of conventional misogyny in the work, but to indicate that desire is natural and should not be experienced as torture.

Lucretius combines an Epicurean wariness of sex as a threat to peace of mind with the Roman cultural value placed on sexuality as an aspect of marriage and family life, pictured as an Epicurean man in a tranquil and friendly marriage with a good but homely woman, beauty being a disquieting prompt to excessive desire. Lucretius reacts against the Roman tendency to display sex ostentatiously, as in erotic art, and rejects the aggressive, "Priapic" model of sexuality spurred by visual stimulus.

=== Stoic sexual morality ===
In early Stoicism among the Greeks, sex was regarded as a good, if enjoyed between people who maintained the principles of respect and friendship; in the ideal society, sex should be enjoyed freely, without bonds of marriage that treated the partner as property. Some Greek Stoics privileged same-sex relations between a man and a younger male partner (see "Pederasty in ancient Greece"). However, Stoics in the Roman Imperial era departed from the view of human beings as "communally sexual animals" and emphasized sex within marriage, which as an institution helped sustain social order. Although they distrusted strong passions, including sexual desire, sexual vitality was necessary for procreation.

Roman-era Stoics such as Seneca and Musonius Rufus, both active about 100 years after Lucretius, emphasized "sex unity" over the polarity of the sexes. Although Musonius is predominately a Stoic, his philosophy also partakes of Platonism and Pythagoreanism. Dimorphism exists, according to Musonius, simply to create difference, and difference in turn creates the desire for a complementary relationship, that is, a couple who will bond for life for the sake of each other and for their children. The Roman ideal of marriage was a partnership of companions who work together to produce and rear children, manage everyday affairs, lead exemplary lives, and enjoy affection; Musonius drew on this ideal to promote the Stoic view that the capacity for virtue and self-mastery was not gender-specific.

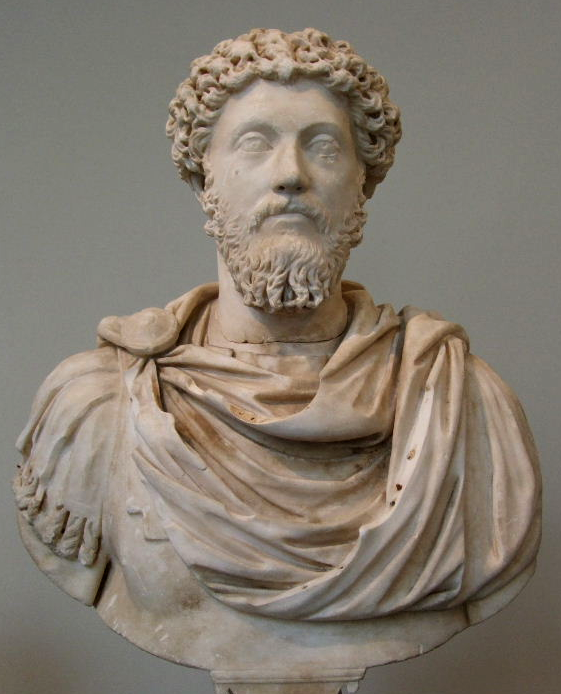
Marcus Aurelius wrote that sex "is the friction of a piece of gut and, following a sort of convulsion, the expulsion of some mucus"

Both Musonius and Seneca criticized the double standard, cultural and legal, that granted Roman men greater sexual freedom than women. Men, Musonius argues, are excused by society for resorting to prostitutes and slaves to satisfy their sexual appetites, while such behavior from a woman would not be tolerated; therefore, if men presume to exercise authority over women because they believe themselves to have greater self-control, they ought to be able to manage their sex drive. The argument, then, is not that sexual freedom is a human good, but that men as well as women should exercise sexual restraint. A man visiting a prostitute does harm to himself by lacking self-discipline; disrespect for his wife and her expectations of fidelity would not be an issue. Similarly, a man should not be so self-indulgent as to exploit a female slave sexually; however, her right not to be used is not a motive for his restraint. Musonius maintained that even within marriage, sex should be undertaken as an expression of affection and for procreation, and not for "bare pleasure".

== Male sexuality ==
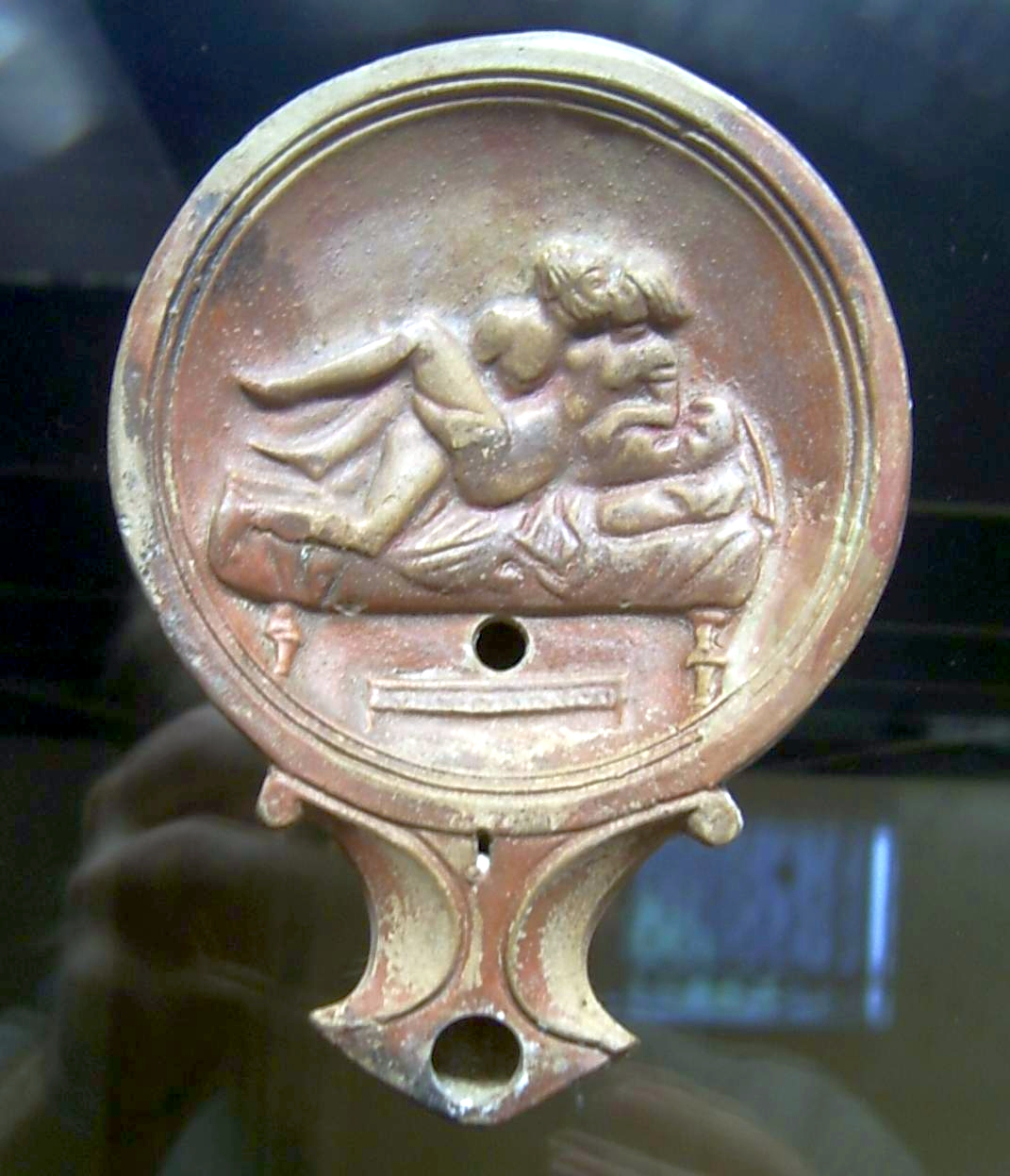
Male–female couple on an oil lamp (Römisch-Germanisches Museum)

During the Republic, a Roman citizen's political liberty (libertas) was defined in part by the right to preserve his body from physical compulsion, including both corporal punishment and sexual abuse. 'Vir' is the ideal 'man,' but it does not refer to the biological aspect of a man, but rather gender as a social status, respectability, and citizenship.Roman ideals of masculinity were thus premised on taking an active role that was also, as Williams has noted, "the prime directive of masculine sexual behavior for Romans." The impetus toward action might express itself most intensely in an ideal of dominance that reflects the hierarchy of Roman patriarchal society. The "conquest mentality" was part of a "cult of virility" that particularly shaped Roman homosexual practices. In the late 20th and early 21st centuries, an emphasis on domination has led scholars to view expressions of Roman male sexuality in terms of a "penetrator-penetrated" binary model; that is, the proper way for a Roman male to seek sexual gratification was to insert his penis in his partner. Allowing himself to be penetrated threatened his liberty as a free citizen as well as his sexual integrity. (Note: See further discussion of how sexual activity defines the free, respectable citizen from the slave or "un-free" person below under Master-slave relations and Pleasure and infamy.)

It was socially acceptable for a freeborn Roman man to desire sex from either sex, as long as he took the penetrative role and was directed towards slaves and prostitutes. Although adultery is looked down upon generally, such relationships were condoned as long as it was confined to slaves and prostitutes, or less often a concubine or "kept woman." Lack of self-control, including in managing one's sex life, indicated that a man was incapable of governing others; the enjoyment of "low sensual pleasure" threatened to erode the elite male's identity as a cultured person. It was a point of pride for Gaius Gracchus to claim that during his term as a provincial governor he kept no slave-boys chosen for their good looks, no female prostitutes visited his house, and he never accosted other men's slave-boys.

In the Imperial era, anxieties about the loss of political liberty and the subordination of the citizen to the emperor were expressed by a perceived increase in passive homosexual behavior among free men, accompanied by a documentable increase in the execution and corporal punishment of citizens. The dissolution of Republican ideals of physical integrity in relation to libertas contributes to and is reflected by the sexual license and decadence associated with the Empire.

=== Male nudity ===
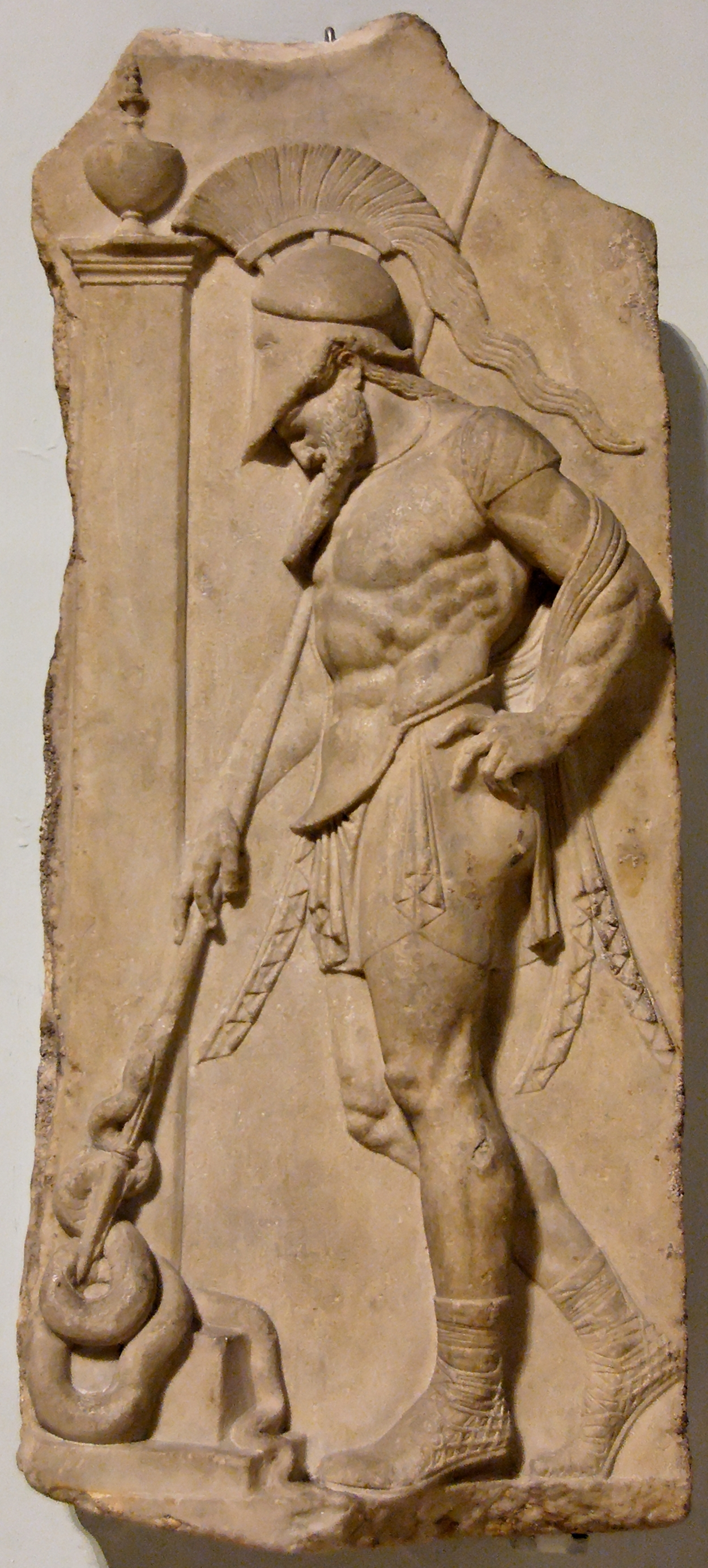
Roman Neo-Attic stele depicting a warrior in a muscle cuirass, idealizing the male form without nudity (1st century BC)

The poet Ennius declared that "exposing naked bodies among citizens is the beginning of public disgrace (flagitium)," a sentiment echoed by Cicero that again links the self-containment of the body with citizenship. Roman attitudes toward nudity differed from those of the Greeks, whose ideal of masculine excellence was expressed by the nude male body in art and in such real-life venues as athletic contests. The toga, by contrast, distinguished the body of the sexually privileged adult Roman male. Even when stripping down for exercises, Roman men kept their genitals and buttocks covered, an Italic custom shared also with the Etruscans, whose art mostly shows them wearing a loincloth, a skirt-like garment, or the earliest form of "shorts" for athletics. Romans who competed in the Olympic Games presumably followed the Greek custom of nudity, but athletic nudity at Rome has been dated variously, possibly as early as the introduction of Greek-style games in the 2nd century BC but perhaps not regularly till the time of Nero around 60 AD.

Public nudity might be offensive or distasteful even in traditional settings; Cicero derides Mark Antony as undignified for appearing near-naked as a participant in the Lupercalia, even though it was ritually required. Nudity is one of the themes of this religious festival that most consumes Ovid's attention in the Fasti, his long-form poem on the Roman calendar. Augustus, during his program of religious revivalism, attempted to reform the Lupercalia, in part by suppressing the use of nudity despite its fertility aspect.

Negative connotations of nudity include defeat in war, since captives were stripped, and slavery, since slaves for sale were often displayed naked. The disapproval of nudity was thus less a matter of trying to suppress inappropriate sexual desire than of dignifying and marking the citizen's body as free.

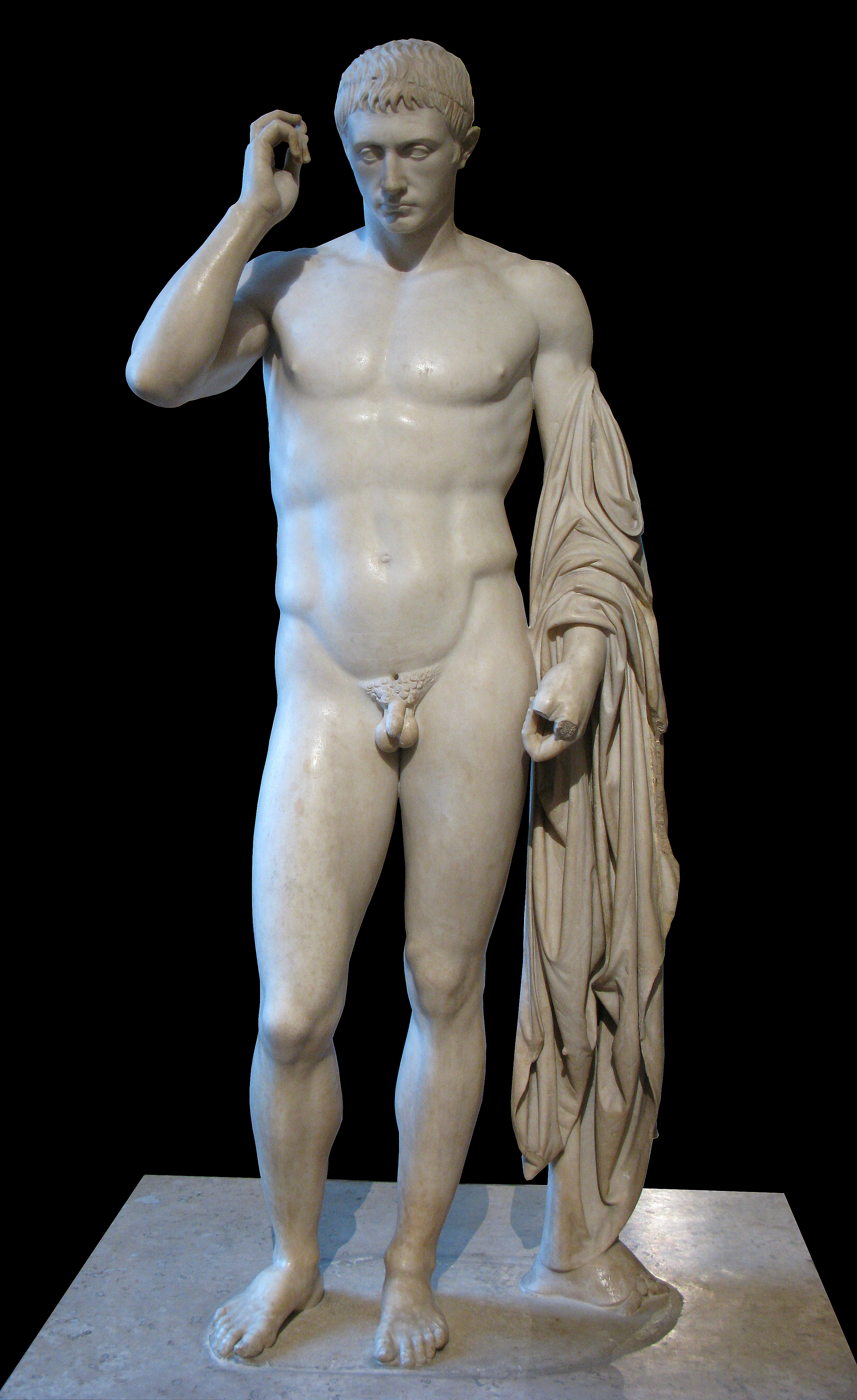
Portrait head of Marcellus, nephew of Augustus (1st century CE), on a body of the Greek Hermes Ludovisi type

The influence of Greek art, however, led to "heroic" nude portrayals of Roman men and gods, a practice that began in the 2nd century BC. When statues of Roman generals nude in the manner of Hellenistic kings first began to be displayed, they were shocking not simply because they exposed the male figure, but because they evoked concepts of royalty and divinity that were contrary to Republican ideals of citizenship as embodied by the toga. In art produced under Augustus, the programmatic adoption of Hellenistic and Neo-Attic style led to more complex signification of the male body shown nude, partially nude, or costumed in a muscle cuirass.

One exception to public nudity was the baths, though attitudes toward nude bathing also changed over time. In the 2nd century BC, Cato preferred not to bathe in the presence of his son, and Plutarch implies that for Romans of these earlier times it was considered shameful for mature men to expose their bodies to younger males. Later, however, men and women might even bathe together. (Note: Until the late Republic, a bath house probably offered women a separate wing or facility, or had a schedule that allowed women and men to bathe at different times. From the late Republic until the rise of Christian dominance in the later Empire, there is clear evidence of mixed bathing. Some scholars have thought that only lower-class women bathed with men, or those such as entertainers or prostitutes who were infames, but Clement of Alexandria observed that women of the highest social classes could be seen naked at the baths. Hadrian prohibited mixed bathing, but the ban seems not to have endured. In short, customs varied not only by time and place but by the facility; see Garrett G. Fagan, Bathing in Public in the Roman World (University of Michigan Press, 1999, 2002), pp. 26–27.)

=== Phallic sexuality ===
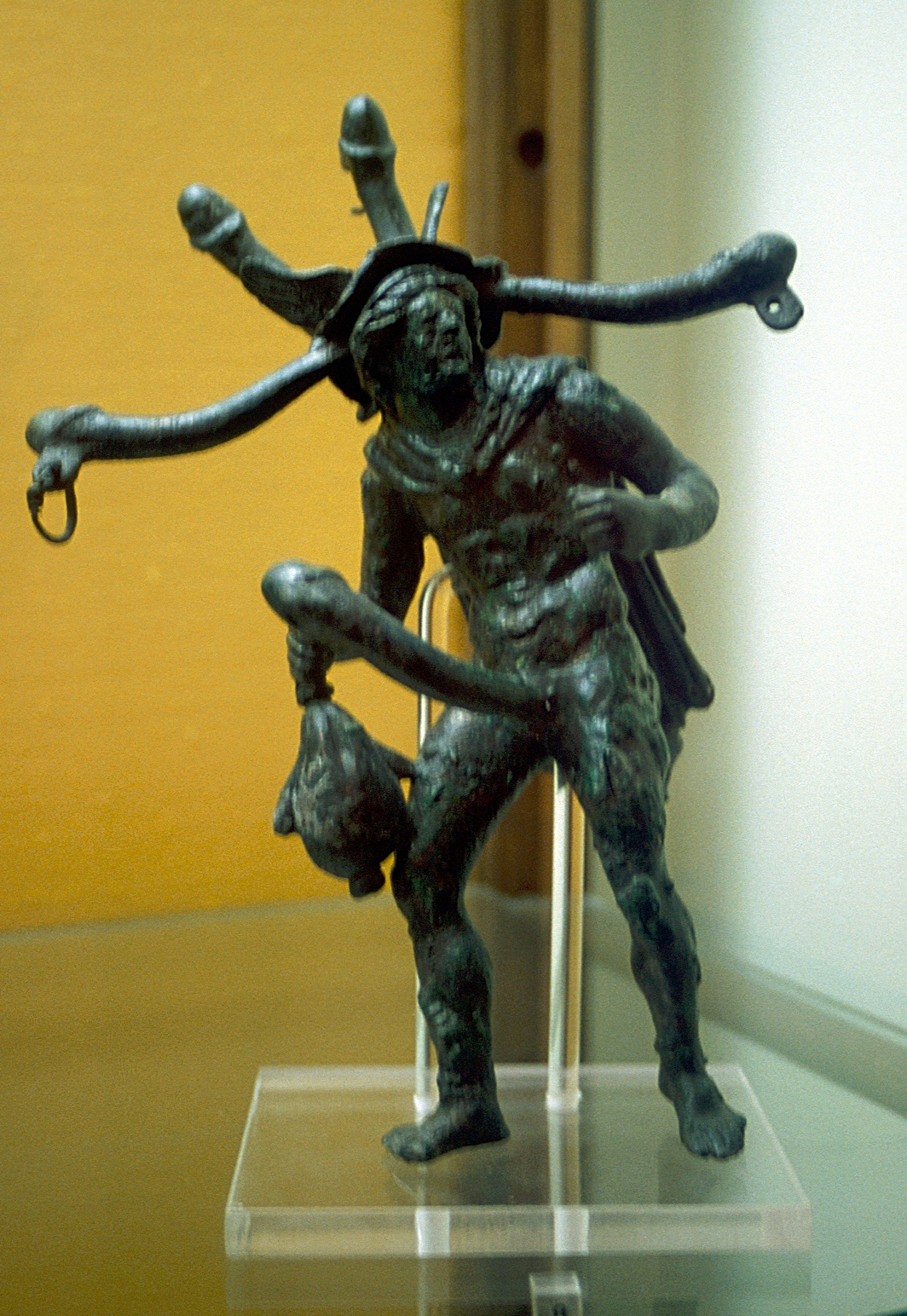
Polyphallic (Note: In Roman Gaul, the Celtic god identified with the Roman Mercury is sometimes represented triphallically; see for instance Miranda Green, Symbol and Image in Celtic Religious Art (Routledge, 1989), p. 184. In The Sorrows of the Ancient Romans: The Gladiator and the Monster (Princeton University Press, 1993), p. 168, Carlin A. Barton associates polyphallic tintinnabula with the Medusa's head and other grotesques.) bronze tintinnabulum; the tip of each phallus was outfitted with a ring to dangle a bell

Roman sexuality as framed by Latin literature has been described as phallocentric. The phallus was supposed to have powers to ward off the evil eye and other malevolent supernatural forces. It was used as an amulet (fascinum), many examples of which survive, particularly in the form of wind chimes (tintinnabula). Some scholars have even interpreted the plan of the Forum Augustum as phallic architecture.

The outsized phallus of Roman art was associated with the god Priapus, among others. It was laughter-provoking, grotesque, or used for magical purposes. Originating in the Greek town of Lampsacus, Priapus was a fertility deity whose statue was placed in gardens to ward off thieves. The poetry collection called the Priapea deals with phallic sexuality, including poems spoken in the person of Priapus. In one, for instance, Priapus threatens anal rape against any potential thief. The wrath of Priapus might cause impotence, or a state of perpetual arousal with no means of release: one curse of Priapus upon a thief was that he might lack women or boys to relieve him of his erection, and burst.

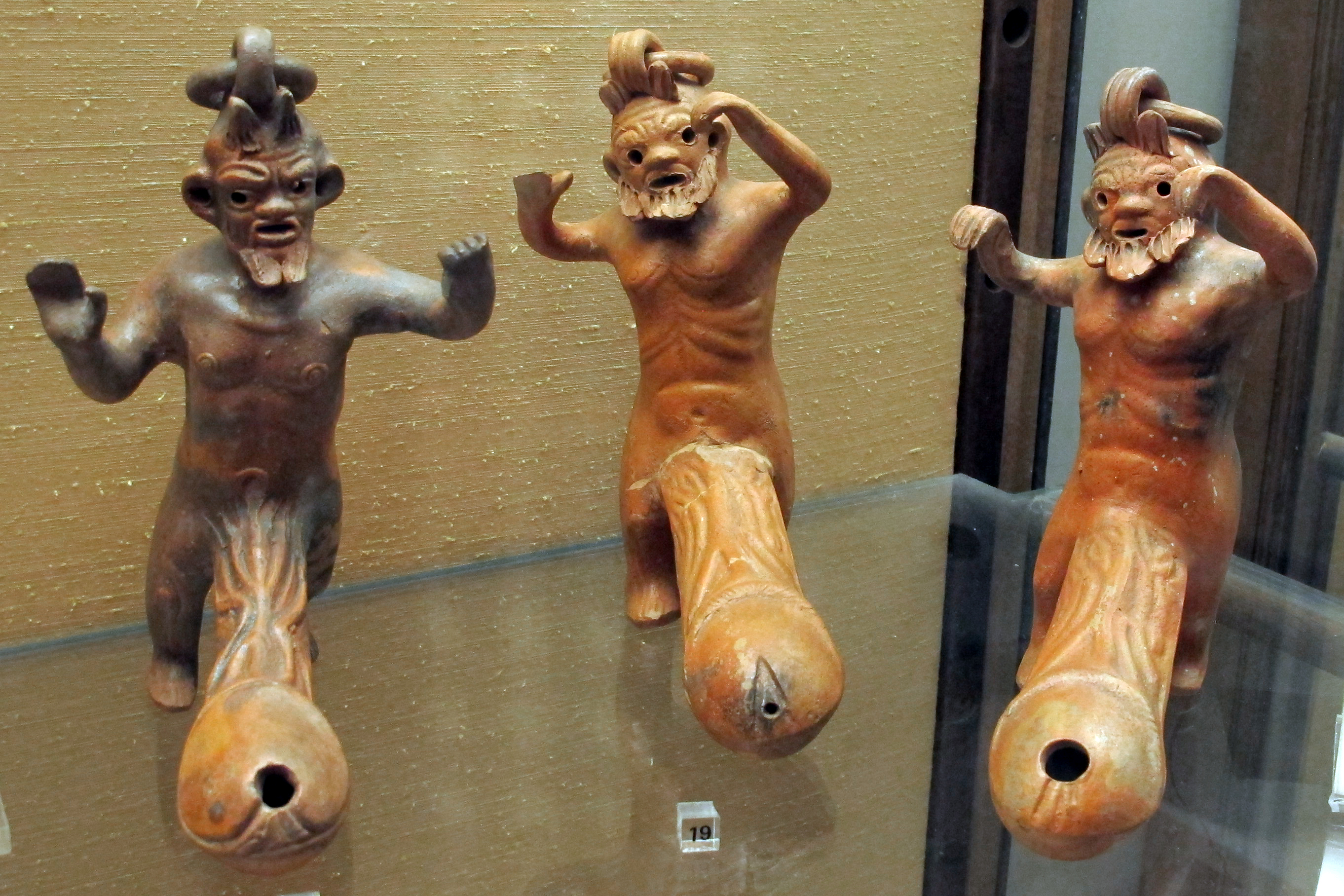
Ithyphallic satyrs as oil lamps (from Pompeii, 1st century AD)

There are approximately 120 recorded Latin terms and metaphors for the penis, with the largest category treating the male member as an instrument of aggression, a weapon. This metaphorical tendency is exemplified by actual lead sling-bullets, which are sometimes inscribed with the image of a phallus, or messages that liken the target to a sexual conquest—for instance "I seek Octavian's asshole." The most common obscenity for the penis is mentula, which Martial argues for in place of polite terms: his privileging of the word as time-honored Latin from the era of Numa may be compared to the unvarnished integrity of "four letter Anglo-Saxon words". Mentula appears frequently in graffiti and the Priapea, but while obscene the word was not inherently abusive or vituperative. Verpa, by contrast, was "an emotive and highly offensive word" for the penis with its foreskin drawn back, as the result of an erection, excessive sexual activity, or circumcision. Virga, as well as other words for "branch, rod, stake, beam", is a common metaphor, as is vomer, "plough".

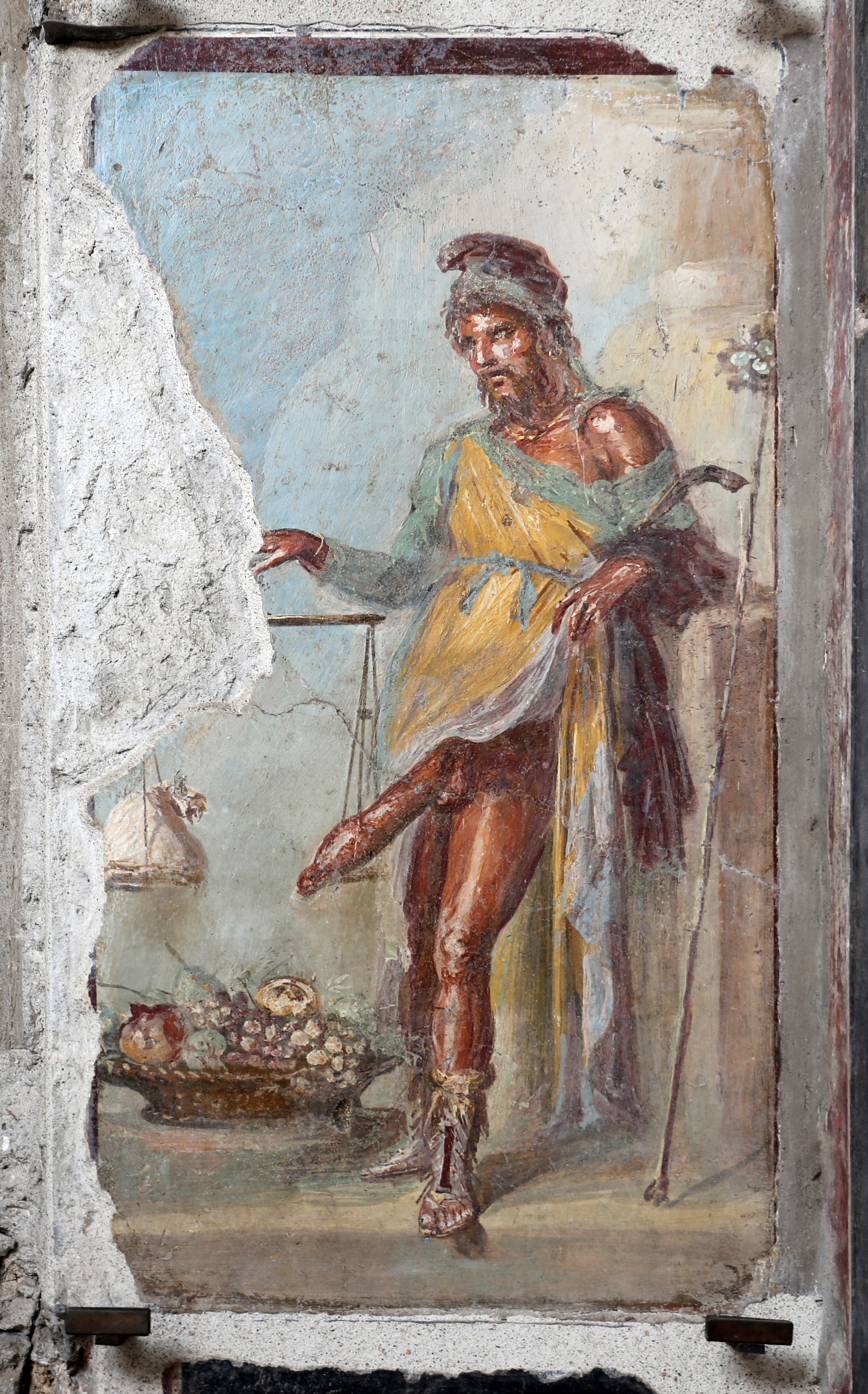
Priapus, wearing a Phrygian cap and weighing his phallus in a balance scale (House of the Vettii)

The penis might also be referred to as the "vein" (vena), "tail" (penis or cauda), or "tendon" (nervus). The English word "penis" derives from penis, which originally meant "tail" but in Classical Latin was used regularly as a risqué colloquialism for the male organ. Later, penis becomes the standard word in polite Latin, as used for example by the scholiast to Juvenal and by Arnobius, but did not pass into usage among the Romance languages. It was not a term used by medical writers, except for Marcellus of Bordeaux. In medieval Latin, a vogue for scholarly obscenity led to a perception of the dactyl, a metrical unit of verse represented ^{— ‿ ‿}, as an image of the penis, with the long syllable (longum) the shaft and the two short syllables (breves) the testicles.

The apparent connection between Latin testes, "testicles," and testis, plural testes, "witness" (the origin of English "testify" and "testimony") may lie in archaic ritual. Some ancient Mediterranean cultures swore binding oaths upon the male genitalia, symbolizing that "the bearing of false witness brings a curse upon not only oneself, but one's house and future line". Latin writers make frequent puns and jokes based on the two meanings of testis: it took balls to become a legally functioning male citizen. The English word "testicle" derives from the diminutive testiculum. The obscene word for "testicle" was coleus, from which descends French couille.

==== Castration and circumcision ====
To Romans and Greeks, castration and circumcision were linked as barbaric mutilations of the male genitalia. When the cult of Cybele was imported to Rome at the end of the 3rd century BC, its traditional eunuchism was typically confined to foreign priests (the Galli), while Roman citizens formed sodalities to perform honours in keeping with their own customs. However, eunuchism also applied towards those who were born without strong sexual characteristics and those who were 'moderatly' emasculated.

Although Greco-Roman writers view circumcision as an identifying characteristic of Jews, they believed the practice to have originated in Egypt, and recorded it among peoples they identified as Arab, Syrian, Phoenician, Colchian, and Ethiopian. The Neoplatonic philosopher Sallustius associates circumcision with the strange familial–sexual customs of the Massagetae who "eat their fathers" and of the Persians who "preserve their nobility by begetting children on their mothers".

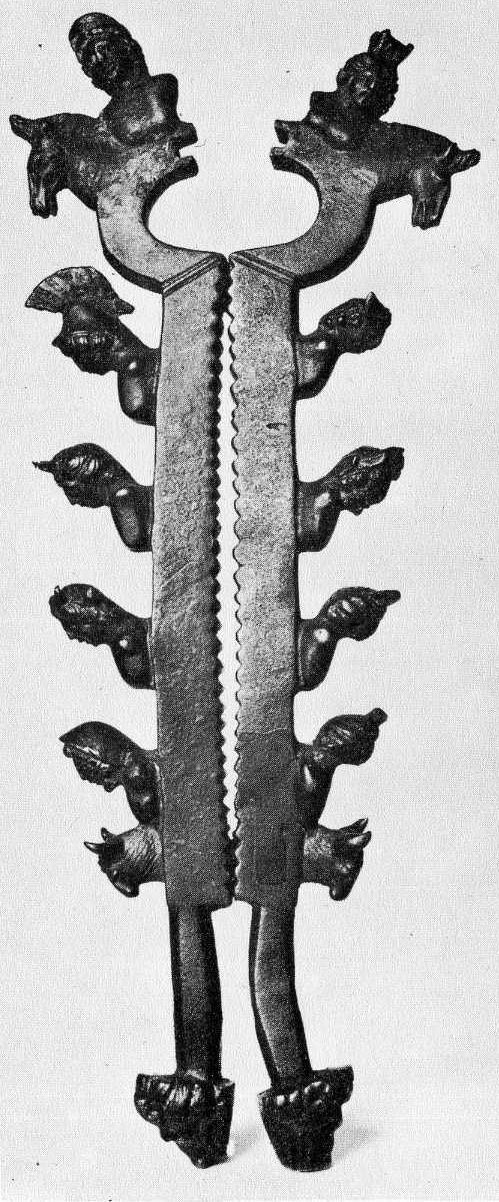
A castration clamp from Roman Britain thought to have been used either by devotees of Cybele or by veterinarians, with the heads of deities and animals having ritual significance

During the Republican period, a Lex Cornelia prohibited various kinds of mutilation, including castration. (Two millennia later, in 1640, the poet Salvatore Rosa would write in La Musica, "Fine Cornelia law, where hast thou gone / Now that the whole of Norcia seems not enough / For the castration of boys?") Despite these prohibitions, some Romans kept beautiful male slaves as deliciae or delicati ("toys, delights") who were sometimes castrated in an effort to preserve the androgynous looks of their youth. The emperor Nero had his freedman Sporus castrated, and married him in a public ceremony.

By the end of the 1st century AD, bans against castration had been enacted by the emperors Domitian and Nerva in the face of a burgeoning trade in eunuch slaves. Sometime between 128 and 132 AD, Hadrian seems to have temporarily banned circumcision, on pain of death. Antoninus Pius exempted Jews from the ban, as well as Egyptian priests, and Origen says that in his time only Jews were permitted to practice circumcision. Legislation under Constantine, the first Christian emperor, freed any slave who was subjected to circumcision; in 339 AD, circumcising a slave became punishable by death.

A medical procedure known as epispasm, which consisted of both surgical and non-surgical methods, existed in ancient Rome and Greece to restore the foreskin and cover the glans "for the sake of decorum". Both were described in detail by the Greek physician Aulus Cornelius Celsus in his comprehensive encyclopedic work De Medicina. The surgical method involved freeing the skin covering the penis by dissection, and then pulling it forward over the glans; he also described a simpler surgical technique used on men whose prepuce is naturally insufficient to cover their glans. The second approach was non-surgical: a restoration device which consisted of a special weight made of bronze, copper, or leather, was affixed to the penis, pulling its skin downward. Over time a new foreskin was generated, or a short prepuce was lengthened, by means of tissue expansion; Martial also mentioned the restoration device in his epigrams (7:35). Hellenized or Romanized Jews resorted to epispasm to better integrate into Greco–Roman society, and also to make themselves less conspicuous at the baths or during athletics. Of these, some had themselves circumcised again later.

=== Regulating semen ===
Too-frequent ejaculation was thought to weaken men. Greek medical theories based on the classical elements and humors recommended limiting the production of semen by means of cooling, drying, and astringent therapies, including cold baths and the avoidance of flatulence-causing foods. In the 2nd century AD, the medical writer Galen explains semen as a concoction of blood (conceived of as a humor) and pneuma (the "vital air" required by organs to function) formed within the man's coiled spermatic vessels, with the humor turning white through heat as it enters into the testicles. In his treatise On Semen, Galen warns that immoderate sexual activity results in a loss of pneuma and hence vitality:

It is not at all surprising that those who are less moderate sexually turn out to be weaker, since the whole body loses the purest part of both substances, and there is besides an accession of pleasure, which by itself is enough to dissolve the vital tone, so that before now some persons have died from excess of pleasure.

The uncontrolled dispersing of pneuma in semen could lead to loss of physical vigor, mental acuity, masculinity, and a strong manly voice, a complaint registered also in the Priapea. Sexual activity was thought particularly to affect the voice: singers and actors might be infibulated to preserve their voices. Quintilian advises that the orator who wished to cultivate a deep masculine voice for court should abstain from sexual relations. This concern was felt intensely by Catullus's friend Calvus, the 1st-century BC avant-garde poet and orator, who slept with lead plates over his kidneys to control wet dreams. Pliny reports that:

When plates of lead are bound to the area of the loins and kidneys, it is used, owing to its rather cooling nature, to check the attacks of sexual desire and sexual dreams in one's sleep that cause spontaneous eruptions to the point of becoming a sort of disease. With these plates the orator Calvus is reported to have restrained himself and to have preserved his body's strength for the labor of his studies.

Lead plates, cupping therapy, and hair removal were prescribed for three sexual disorders thought to be related to nocturnal emissions: satyriasis, or hypersexuality; priapism, a chronic erection without an accompanying desire for sex; and the involuntary discharge of semen.

=== Effeminacy and transvestism ===
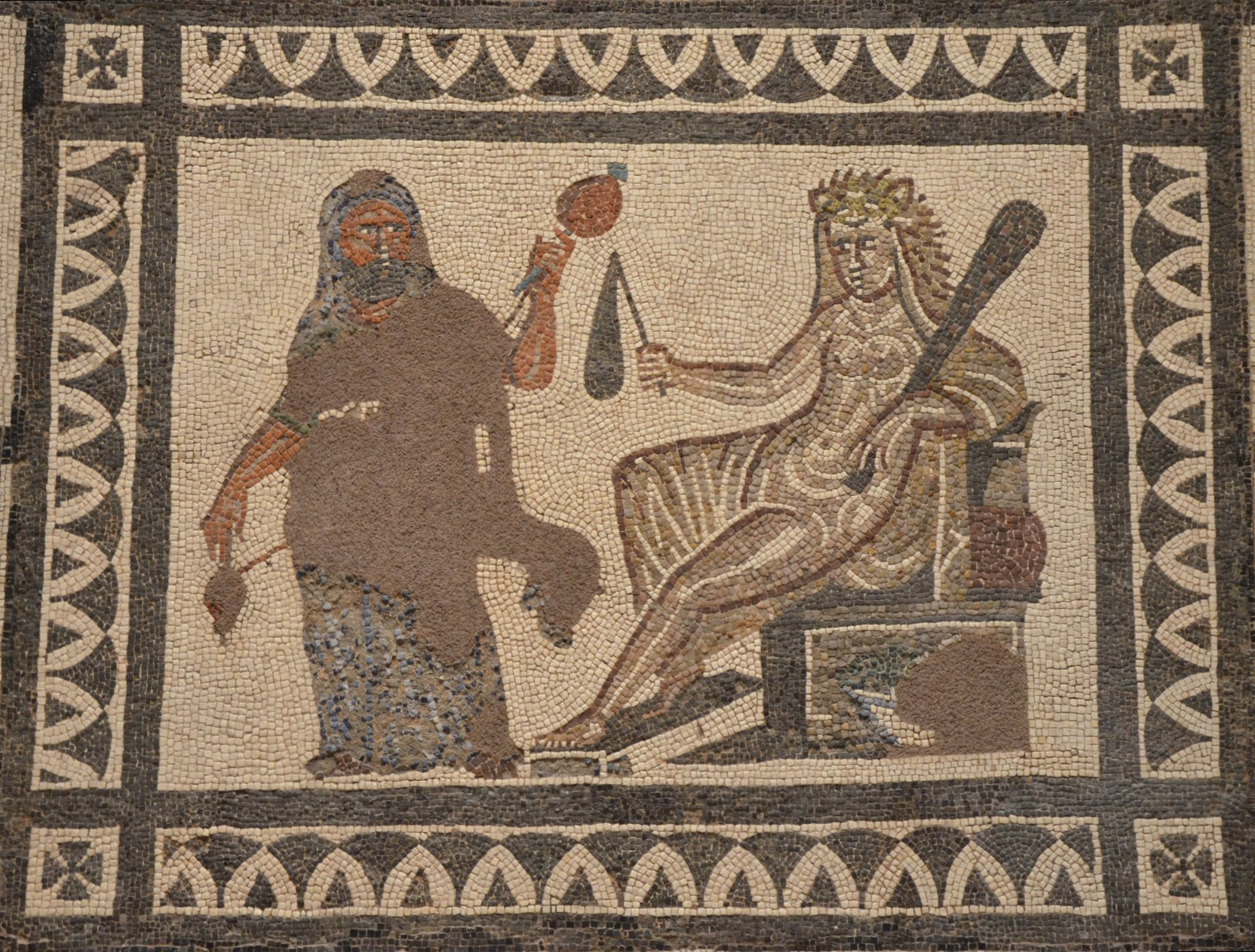
Hercules and Omphale cross-dressed (mosaic from Roman Spain, 3rd century AD)

Effeminacy was a favorite accusation in Roman political invective, and was aimed particularly at populares, the politicians of the faction who represented themselves as champions of the people, sometimes called Rome's "democratic" party in contrast to the optimates, a conservative elite of nobles. In the last years of the Republic, the popularists Julius Caesar, Marcus Antonius (Mark Antony), and Clodius Pulcher, as well as the Catilinarian conspirators, were all derided as effeminate, overly-groomed, too-good-looking men who might be on the receiving end of sex from other males; at the same time, they were supposed to be womanizers or possessed of devastating sex appeal.

Perhaps the most notorious incident of cross-dressing in ancient Rome occurred in 62 BC, when Clodius Pulcher intruded on annual rites of the Bona Dea that were restricted to women only. The rites were held at a senior magistrate's home, in this year that of Julius Caesar, nearing the end of his term as praetor and only recently invested as Pontifex Maximus. Clodius disguised himself as a female musician to gain entrance, as described in a "verbal striptease" by Cicero, who prosecuted him for sacrilege (incestum):

Take away his saffron dress, his tiara, his girly shoes and purple laces, his bra, his Greek harp, take away his shameless behavior and his sex crime, and Clodius is suddenly revealed as a man of the people.

The actions of Clodius, who had just been elected quaestor and was probably about to turn thirty, are often regarded as a last juvenile prank. The all-female nature of these nocturnal rites attracted much prurient speculation from men; they were fantasized as drunken lesbian orgies that might be fun to watch. Clodius is supposed to have intended to seduce Caesar's wife, but his masculine voice gave him away before he got a chance. The scandal prompted Caesar to seek an immediate divorce to control the damage to his own reputation, giving rise to the famous line "Caesar's wife must be above suspicion". The incident "summed up the disorder of the final years of the republic".

In addition to political invective, cross-dressing appears in Roman literature and art as a mythological trope (as in the story of Hercules and Omphale exchanging roles and attire), religious investiture, and rarely or ambiguously as transvestic fetishism. A section of the Digest by Ulpian categorizes Roman clothing on the basis of who may appropriately wear it; a man who wore women's clothes, Ulpian notes, would risk making himself the object of scorn. A fragment from the playwright Accius (170–86 BC) seems to refer to a father who secretly wore "virgin's finery". An instance of transvestism is noted in a legal case, in which "a certain senator accustomed to wear women's evening clothes" was disposing of the garments in his will. In a "mock trial" exercise presented by the elder Seneca, a young man (adulescens) is gang-raped while wearing women's clothes in public, but his attire is explained as his acting on a dare by his friends, not as a choice based on gender identity or the pursuit of erotic pleasure.

Gender ambiguity was a characteristic of the priests of the goddess Cybele known as Galli, whose ritual attire included items of women's clothing. They are sometimes considered a transgender priesthood, since they were required to be castrated in imitation of Attis. The complexities of gender identity in the religion of Cybele and the Attis myth are explored by Catullus in one of his longest poems, Carmen 63.

=== Male–male sex ===
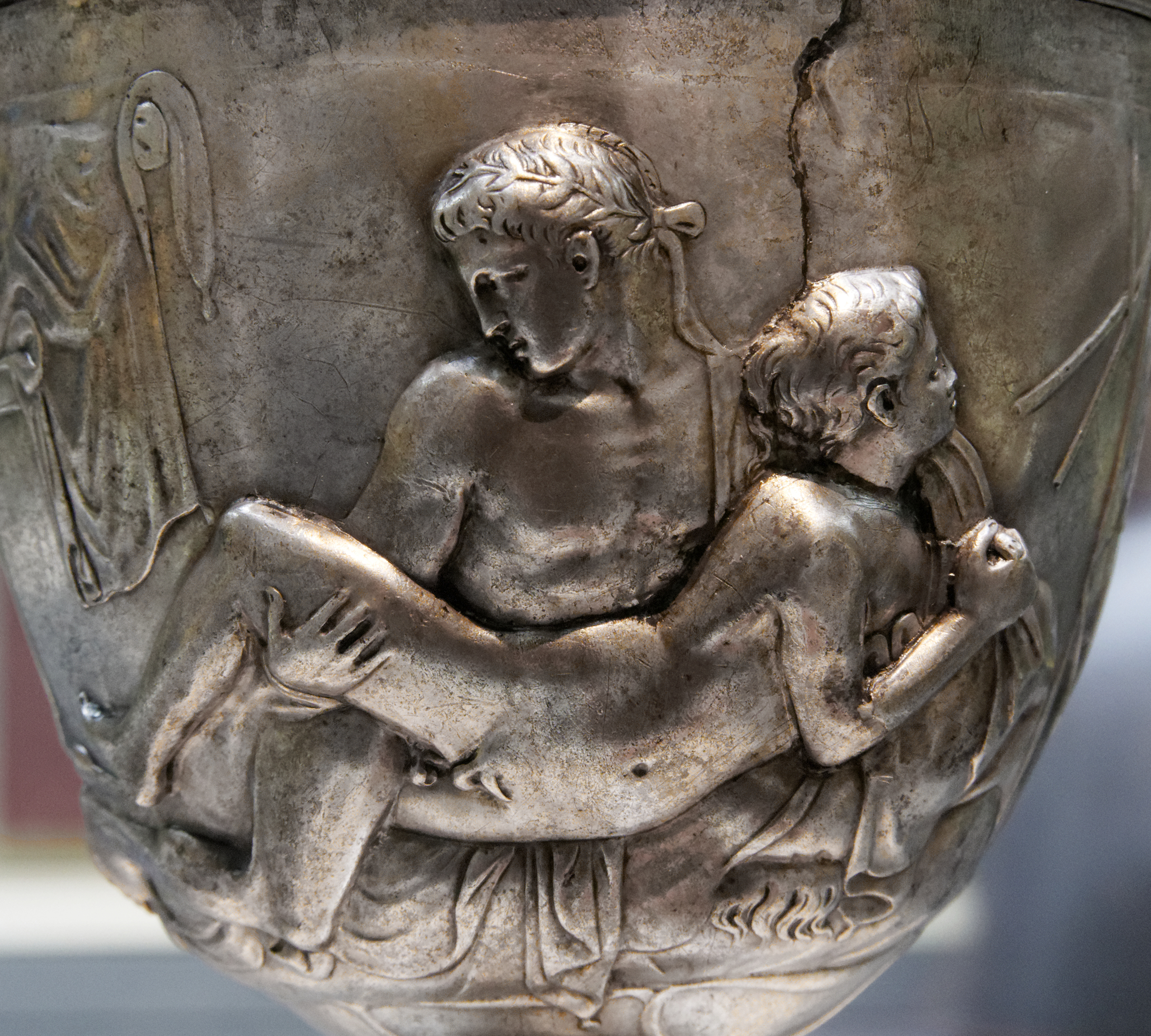
Pederastic sex on the "Roman" side of the Warren Cup (British Museum, London, 15 BCE – 15 CE)

Roman men were free to have sex with males of lower status with no perceived loss of masculine prestige, and indeed, sexual mastery and dominance of others — regardless of their sex — could even enhance their masculinity. However, those who took the receiving role in sex acts, sometimes referred to as the "passive" or "submissive" role, were disparaged as weak and effeminate (see the section below on cunnilungus and fellatio), while having sex with males in the active position was proof of one's masculinity. Physical mastery over other people was an aspect of the citizen's libertas, political liberty, and that certainly included for the purpose of sexual gratification, whether that was with a woman or a man. On the other hand, allowing one's body to be subjugated for the pleasure of others, particularly for sexual purposes, was seen as degrading and a mark of weakness and servility. Laws such as the poorly understood Lex Scantinia and various pieces of Augustan moral legislation were meant to restrict same-sex activity among freeborn males, viewed as threatening a man's status and independence as a citizen.

Latin had such a wealth of words for men outside the masculine norm that some scholars argue for the existence of a homosexual subculture at Rome; that is, although the noun "homosexual" has no straightforward equivalent in Latin and is an anachronism when applied to Roman culture, literary sources do reveal a pattern of behaviors among a minority of free men that indicate same-sex preference or orientation. Some terms, such as exoletus, specifically refer to an adult; Romans who were socially marked as "masculine" did not confine their same-sex penetration of male prostitutes, amasius or slaves to those who were "boys" under the age of 20. The Satyricon, for example, includes many descriptions of adult, free men showing sexual interest in one another. Some older men may at times have preferred the passive role with a partner of the same age or younger, but this was socially frowned upon.

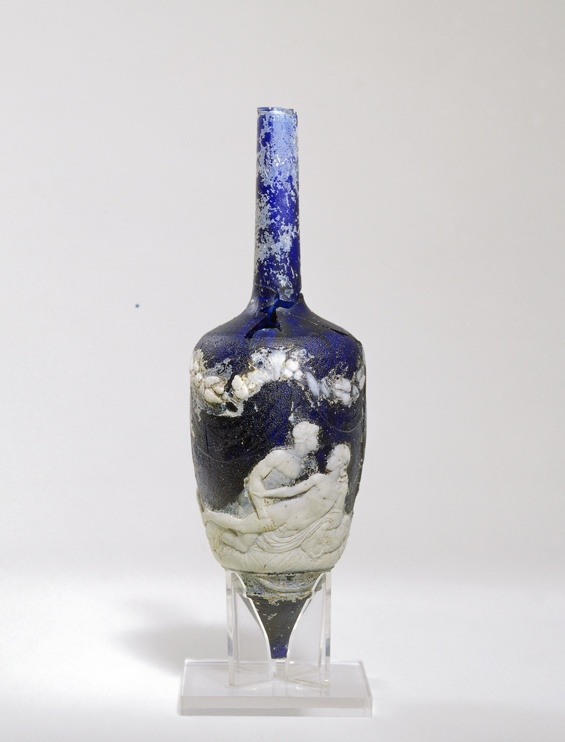
Cameo glass perfume bottle, found in the Roman necropolis of Ostippo, Spain (25 BCE–14 CE), showing two males on a bed; the other side, not shown, has a female and a male (George Ortiz Collection)

Homoerotic Latin literature includes the "Juventius" poems of Catullus, elegies by Tibullus and Propertius, the second Eclogue of Vergil, and several poems by Horace. Lucretius addresses the love of boys in De rerum natura (4.1052–1056). The poet Martial, despite being married to a woman, often derides women as sexual partners, and celebrates the charms of pueri (boys). The Satyricon of Petronius is so permeated with the culture of male–male sexuality that in 18th-century European literary circles, his name became "a byword for homosexuality". Although Ovid includes mythological treatments of homoeroticism in the Metamorphoses, he is unusual among Latin love poets, and indeed among Romans in general, for his aggressively heterosexual stance, though even he did not claim exclusive heterosexuality.

Although Roman law did not recognize marriage between men, in the early Imperial period some male couples were celebrating traditional marriage rites. Same-sex weddings are reported by sources that mock them; the feelings of the participants are not recorded.

Apart from measures to protect the liberty of citizens, the prosecution of homosexuality as a general crime began in the 3rd century when male prostitution was banned by Philip the Arab, a sympathizer of the Christian faith. By the end of the 4th century, passive homosexuality under the Christian Empire was punishable by burning. "Death by sword" was the punishment for a "man coupling like a woman" under the Theodosian Code. Under Justinian, all same-sex acts, passive or active, no matter who the partners, were declared contrary to nature and punishable by death. Homosexual behaviors were pointed to as causes for God's wrath following a series of disasters around 542 and 559. Justinian also demanded the penalty of death for anyone who enslaved a castrated Roman, although he permitted the buying and selling of foreign-born eunuchs as long as they were castrated outside the boundaries of the Roman Empire (Codex Justinianus, 4.42.2).

=== Rape of men ===
Men who had been raped were exempt from the loss of legal or social standing (infamia) suffered by males who prostituted themselves or willingly took the receiving role in sex. According to the jurist Pomponius, "whatever man has been raped by the force of robbers or the enemy in wartime (vi praedonum vel hostium)" ought to bear no stigma. Fears of mass rape following a military defeat extended equally to male and female potential victims.

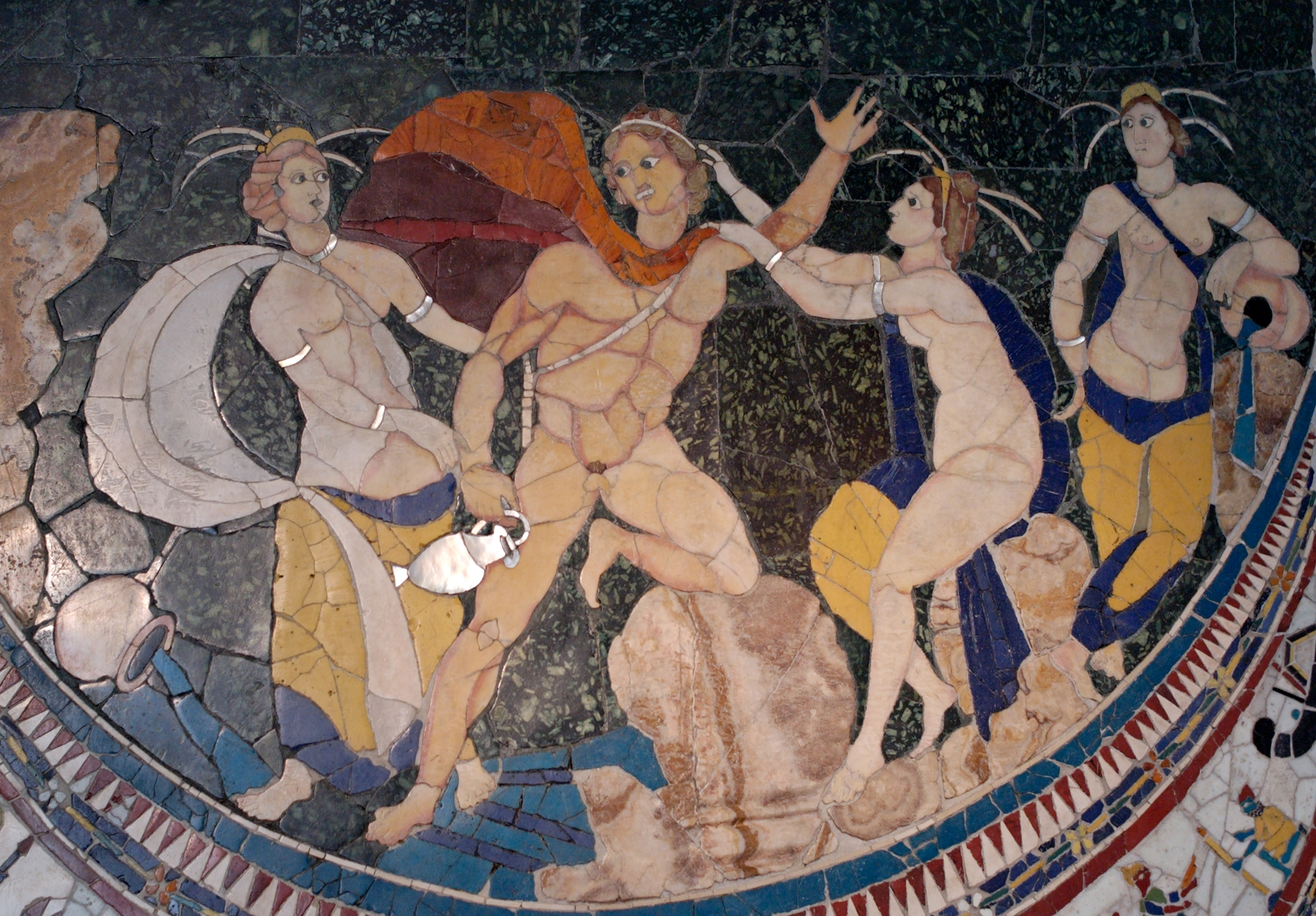
The mythological abduction or "rape" of Hylas by the nymphs (opus sectile, basilica of Junius Bassus, 4th century AD)

Roman law addressed the rape of a male citizen as early as the 2nd century BC, when a ruling was issued in a case that may have involved a male of same-sex orientation. Although a man who had worked as a prostitute could not be raped as a matter of law, it was ruled that even a man who was "disreputable (famosus) and questionable (suspiciosus)" had the same right as other free men not to have his body subjected to forced sex. In a book on rhetoric from the early 1st century BC, the rape of a freeborn male (ingenuus) is equated with that of a materfamilias as a capital crime. The Lex Julia de vi publica, recorded in the early 3rd century AD but "probably dating from the dictatorship of Julius Caesar", defined rape as forced sex against "boy, woman, or anyone"; the rapist was subject to execution, a rare penalty in Roman law. It was a capital crime for a man to abduct a free-born boy for sexual purposes, or to bribe the boy's chaperone (comes) for the opportunity. Negligent chaperones could be prosecuted under various laws, placing the blame on those who failed in their responsibilities as guardians rather than on the victim. Although the law recognized the victim's blamelessness, rhetoric used by the defense indicates that attitudes of blame among jurors could be exploited.

In his collection of twelve anecdotes dealing with assaults on chastity, the historian Valerius Maximus features male victims in equal number to female. In the "mock trial" case described by the elder Seneca, an adulescens (a man young enough not to have begun his formal career) was gang-raped by ten of his peers; although the case is imaginary, Seneca assumes that the law permitted the successful prosecution of the rapists. Another hypothetical case imagines the extremity to which a rape victim could be driven: the free-born male who was raped commits suicide. The rape of an ingenuus is among the worst crimes that could be committed in Rome, along with parricide, the rape of a female virgin, and robbing a temple. Rape was nevertheless one of the traditional punishments inflicted on a male adulterer by the wronged husband, though perhaps more in revenge fantasy than in practice. The threat of one man to subject another to anal or oral rape (irrumatio) is a theme of invective poetry, most notably in Catullus' notorious Carmen 16, and was a form of masculine braggadocio.

=== Sex in the military ===
The Roman soldier, like any free and respectable Roman male of status, was expected to show self-discipline in matters of sex. Soldiers convicted of adultery were given a dishonorable discharge; convicted adulterers were barred from enlisting. Strict commanders might ban prostitutes and pimps from camp, though in general the Roman army, whether on the march or at a permanent fort (castrum), was attended by a number of camp followers who might include prostitutes. Their presence seems to have been taken for granted, and mentioned mainly when it became a problem.

Perhaps most peculiar is the prohibition against marriage in the Imperial army. In the early period, Rome had an army of citizens who left their families and took up arms as the need arose. During the expansionism of the Middle Republic, Rome began acquiring vast territories to be defended as provinces, and during the time of Gaius Marius (d. 86 BC), the army had been professionalized. The ban on marriage began under Augustus (ruled 27 BC–14 AD), perhaps to discourage families from following the army and impairing its mobility. The marriage ban applied to all ranks up to the centurionate; men of the governing classes were exempt. By the 2nd century AD, the stability of the Empire kept most units in permanent forts, where attachments with local women often developed. Although legally these unions could not be formalized as marriages, their value in providing emotional support for the soldiers was recognized. After a soldier was discharged, the couple were granted the right of legal marriage as citizens (conubium), and any children they already had were considered to have been born to citizens. Septimius Severus rescinded the ban in 197 AD.

Other forms of sexual gratification available to soldiers were the use of male slaves, war rape, and same-sex relations. Homosexual behavior among soldiers was subject to harsh penalties, including death, as a violation of military discipline. Polybius (2nd century BC) reports that same-sex activity in the military was punishable by the fustuarium, clubbing to death. Sex among fellow soldiers violated the Roman decorum against intercourse with another freeborn male. A soldier maintained his masculinity by not allowing his body to be used for sexual purposes. This physical integrity stood in contrast to the limits placed on his actions as a free man within the military hierarchy; most strikingly, Roman soldiers were the only citizens regularly subjected to corporal punishment, reserved in the civilian world mainly for slaves. Sexual integrity helped distinguish the status of the soldier, who otherwise sacrificed a great deal of his civilian autonomy, from that of the slave. In warfare, rape signified defeat, another motive for the soldier not to compromise his body sexually.

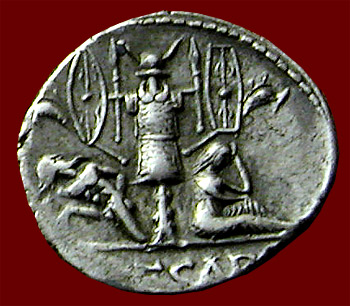
Reverse side of a denarius issued by Julius Caesar, depicting a military trophy with a nude captured Gaul and a female personification of defeated Gallia; Venus is pictured on the obverse

An incident related by Plutarch in his biography of Marius illustrates the soldier's right to maintain his sexual integrity. A good-looking young recruit named Trebonius had been sexually harassed over a period of time by his superior officer, who happened to be Marius' nephew, Gaius Luscius. One night, having fended off unwanted advances on numerous occasions, Trebonius was summoned to Luscius' tent. Unable to disobey the command of his superior, he found himself the object of a sexual assault and drew his sword, killing Luscius. A conviction for killing an officer typically resulted in execution. When brought to trial, he was able to produce witnesses to show that he had repeatedly had to fend off Luscius, and "had never prostituted his body to anyone, despite offers of expensive gifts". Marius not only acquitted Trebonius in the killing of his kinsman, but gave him a crown for bravery. Roman historians record other cautionary tales of officers who abuse their authority to coerce sex from their soldiers, and then suffer dire consequences. The youngest officers, who still might retain some of the adolescent attraction that Romans favored in male–male relations, were advised to beef up their masculine qualities, such as not wearing perfume, nor trimming nostril and underarm hair.

During wartime, the violent use of war captives for sex was not considered criminal rape. Mass rape was one of the acts of punitive violence during the sack of a city, but if the siege had ended through diplomatic negotiations rather than storming the walls, by custom the inhabitants were neither enslaved nor subjected to personal violence. Mass rape occurred in some circumstances, and is likely to be underreported in the surviving sources, but was not a deliberate or pervasive strategy for controlling a population. An ethical ideal of sexual self-control among enlisted men was vital to preserving peace once hostilities ceased. In territories and provinces brought under treaty with Rome, soldiers who committed rape against the local people might be subjected to harsher punishments than civilians. Sertorius, the long-time governor of Roman Spain whose policies emphasized respect and cooperation with provincials, executed an entire cohort when a single soldier had attempted to rape a local woman. Mass rape seems to have been more common as a punitive measure during Roman civil wars than abroad.

== Female sexuality ==
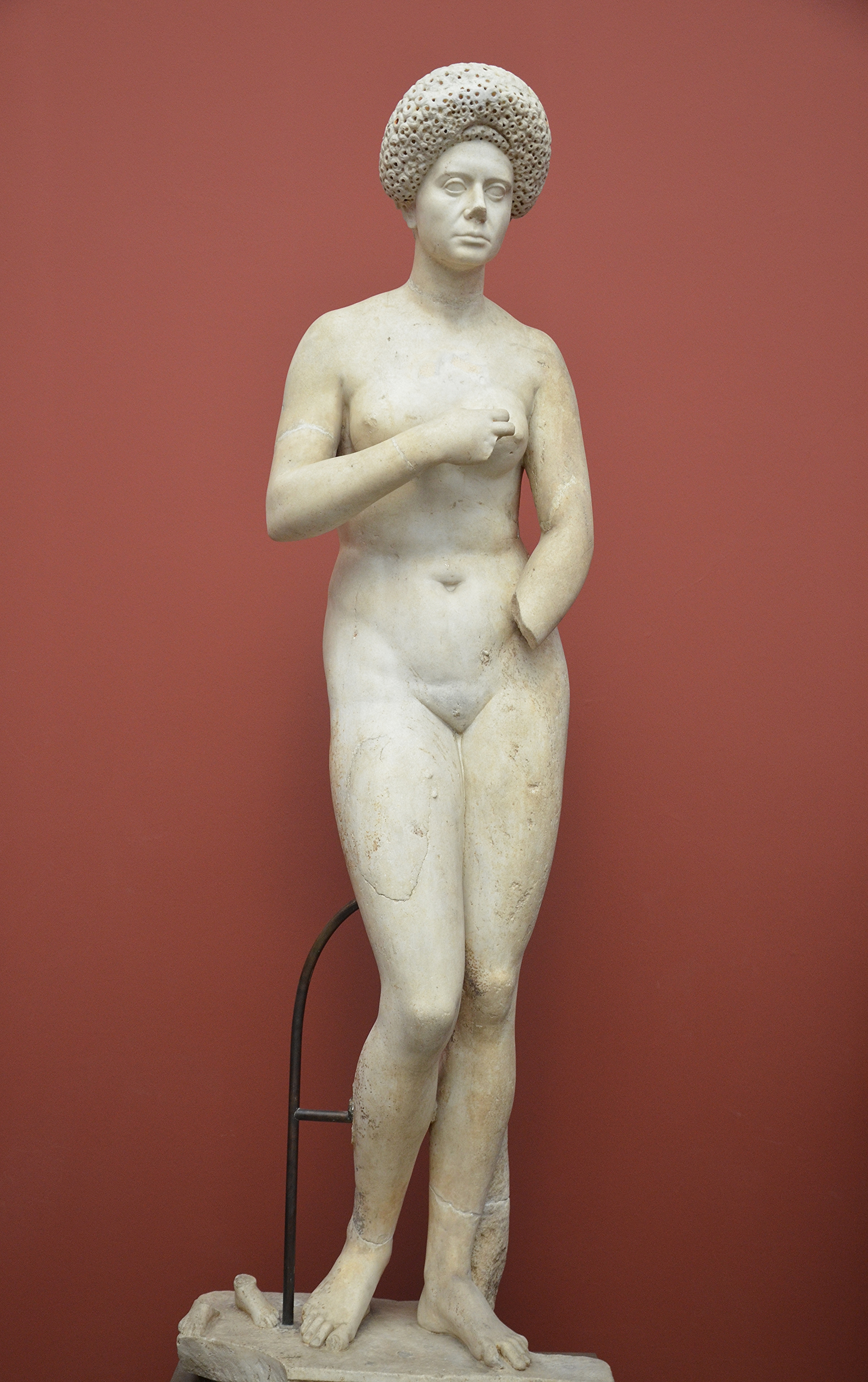
A Roman woman with a Flavian-era hairstyle portrayed as Venus pudica, 98-117 CE

Because of the Roman emphasis on family, female sexuality was regarded as one of the bases for social order and prosperity. Female citizens were expected to exercise their sexuality within marriage, and were honored for their sexual integrity (pudicitia) and fecundity: Augustus granted special honors and privileges to women who had given birth to three children (see jus trium liberorum). Control of female sexuality was regarded as necessary for the stability of the state, as embodied most conspicuously in the absolute virginity of the Vestals. A Vestal who violated her vow was entombed alive in a ritual that mimicked some aspects of a Roman funeral; her lover was executed by being beaten to death. Female sexuality, either disorderly or exemplary, often impacts state religion in times of crisis for the Republic.

As was the case for men, free women who displayed themselves sexually, such as prostitutes and performers, or who made themselves available indiscriminately were excluded from legal protections and social respectability.

Many Roman literary sources approve of respectable women exercising sexual passion within marriage. While ancient literature overwhelmingly takes a male-centered view of sexuality, the Augustan poet Ovid expresses an explicit and virtually unique interest in how women experience intercourse.

=== Female body ===
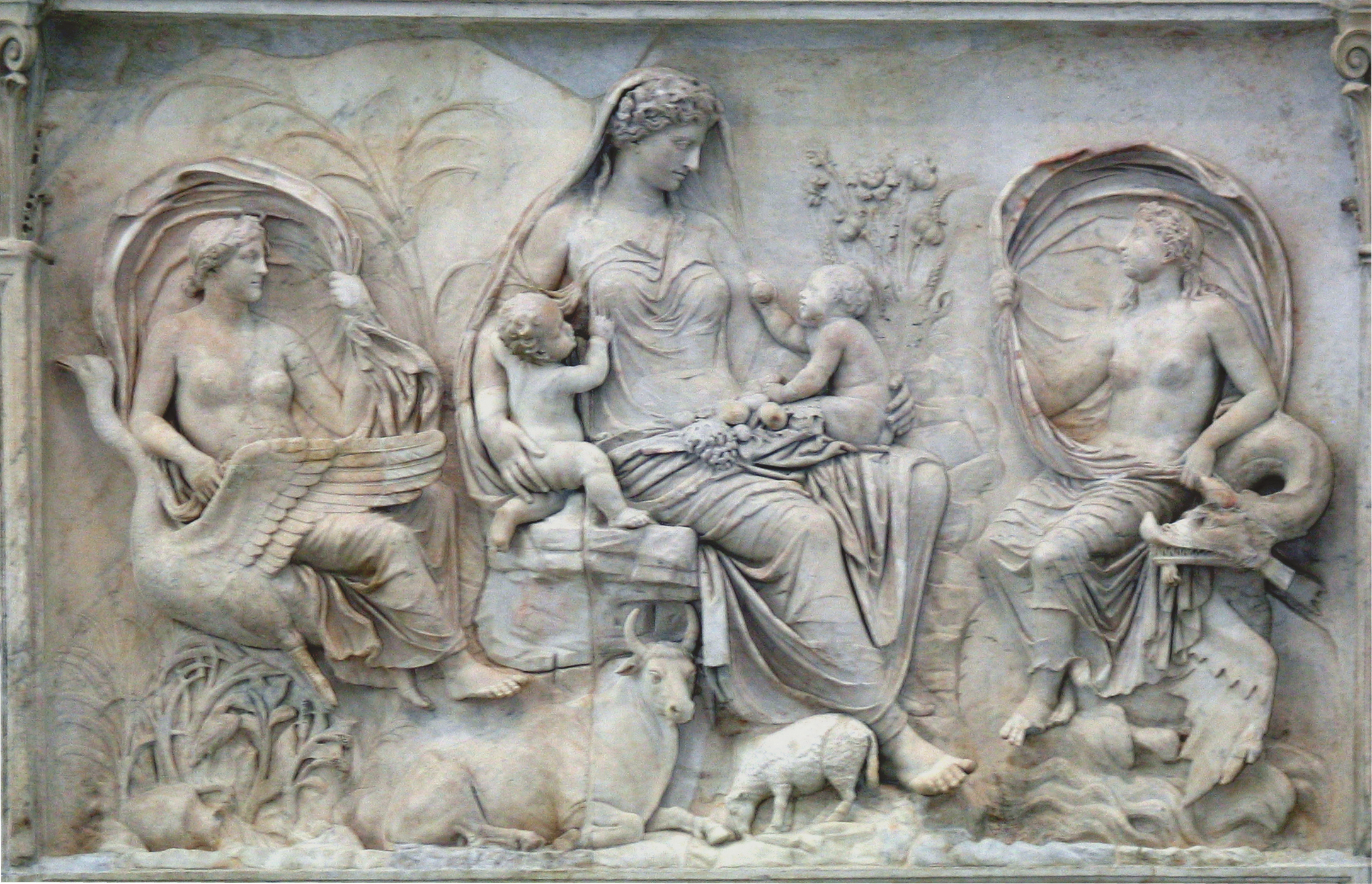
Divine semi-nudity on the Augustan Altar of Peace, combining Roman symbolism with a Greek stylistic influence

Roman attitudes toward female nudity differed from but were influenced by those of the Greeks, who idealized the male body in the nude while portraying respectable women clothed. Partial nudity of goddesses in Roman Imperial art, however, can highlight the breasts as dignified but pleasurable images of nurturing, abundance, and peacefulness. Erotic art indicates that women with small breasts and wide hips were considered to have had the ideal body type. By the 1st century AD, Roman art shows a broad interest in the female nude engaged in varied activities, including sex. Pornographic art that depicts women presumed to be prostitutes performing sex acts may show the breasts covered by a strophium even when the rest of the body is naked.

In the real world, as described in literature, prostitutes sometimes displayed themselves naked at the entrance to their brothel cubicles, or wore see-through silk garments; slaves for sale were often displayed naked to allow buyers to inspect them for defects, and to symbolize that they lacked the right to control their own body. As Seneca the Elder described a woman for sale:

Naked she stood on the shore, at the pleasure of the purchaser; every part of her body was examined and felt. Would you hear the result of the sale? The pirate sold; the pimp bought, that he might employ her as a prostitute.

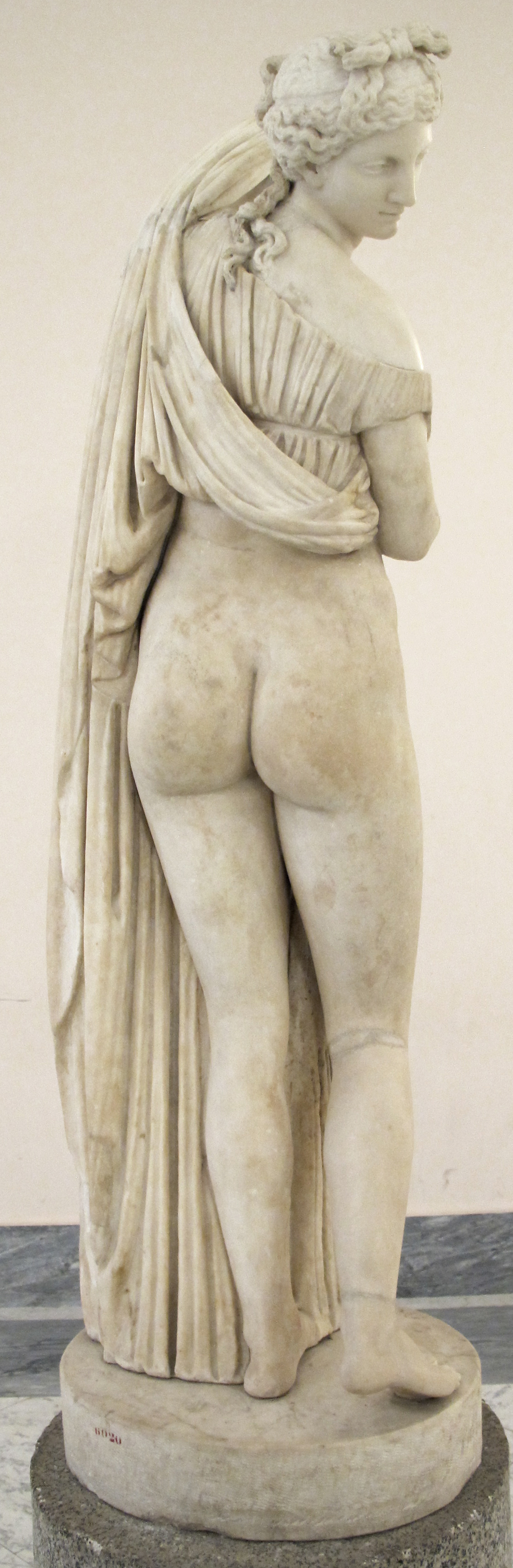

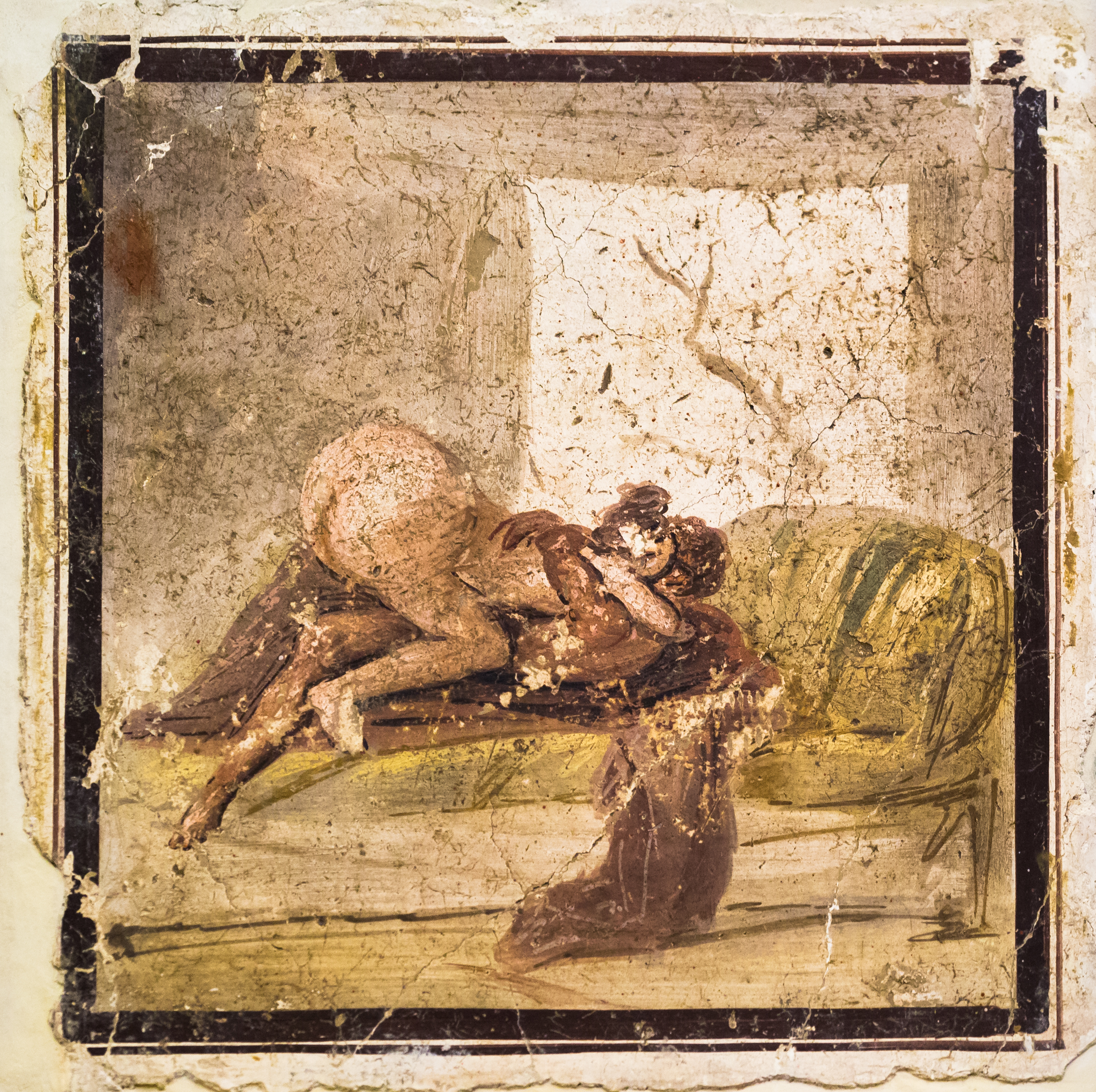
Above, a wall painting from Pompeii depicting the full buttocks characteristic of "callipygian" Venus, shown left in a 1st–2nd century AD Roman version (restored by Carlo Albacini)

==== Female genitals ====
The "basic obscenity" for the female genitalia is cunnus ('cunt'), though perhaps not as strongly offensive as the English. Martial uses the word more than thirty times, Catullus once, and Horace thrice only in his early work; it also appears in the Priapea and graffiti. One of the slang words women used for their genitals was porcus ('pig'), particularly when mature women spoke of girls. Varro connects this usage of the word to the sacrifice of a pig to the goddess Ceres in preliminary wedding rites. Metaphors of fields, gardens, and meadows are common, as is the image of the masculine "plough" in the feminine "furrow". Other metaphors include cave, ditch, pit, bag, vessel, door, hearth, oven, and altar.

Although women's genitals appear often in invective and satiric verse as objects of disgust, they are rarely referred to in Latin love elegy. Ovid, the most heterosexual of the classic love poets, is the only one to refer to giving a woman pleasure through genital stimulation. Martial writes of female genitalia only insultingly, describing one woman's vagina as "loose ... as the foul gullet of a pelican". The vagina is often compared to a boy's anus as a receptacle for the phallus.

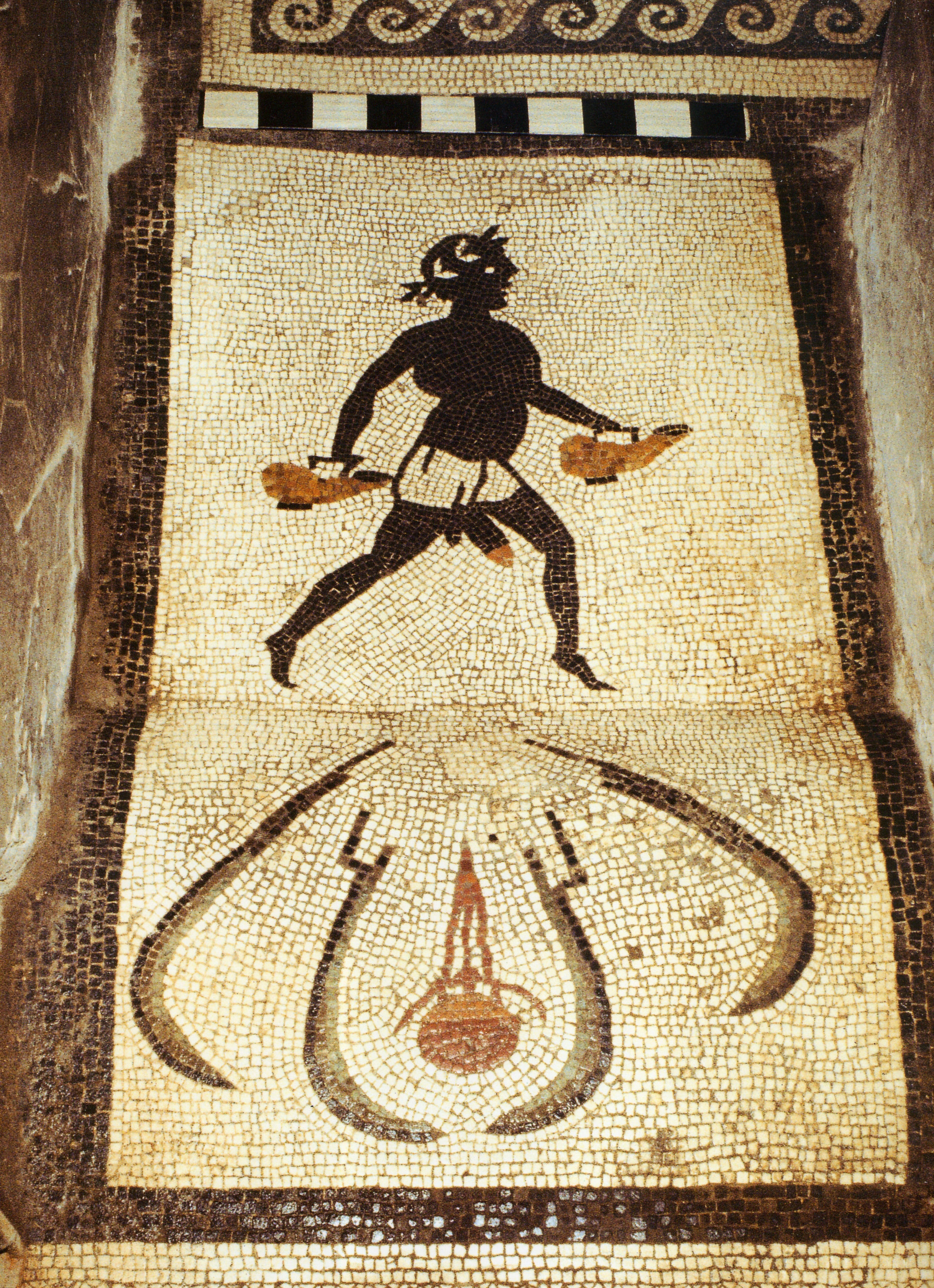
Female genitalia formed from strigils on a mosaic, seen below an African depicted with a stereotypically large phallus

The function of the clitoris (landica) was "well understood". In classical Latin, landica was a highly indecorous obscenity found in graffiti and the Priapea; the clitoris was usually referred to with a metaphor, such as Juvenal's crista ('crest').

Latin lacked a standard word for labia; two terms found in medical writers are orae ('edges' or 'shores'), and pinnacula ('little wings'). The first recorded instance of the word vulva occurs in Varro's work on agriculture (1st century BC), where it refers to the membrane that surrounds a fetus. In the early Empire, vulva came into usage for 'womb', the usual word for which had been uterus in the Republic, or sometimes more vaguely venter or alvus, both words for 'belly'. Vulva seems originally to have referred to the womb of animals, but is "extremely common" in Pliny's Natural History for a human uterus. In the Imperial era, vulva can mean 'female reproductive organs' collectively or vaguely, or sometimes refers to the vagina alone. Early Latin Bible translators used vulva as the correct and proper word for the womb. At some point during the Imperial era, matrix became the common word for 'uterus', particularly in the gynecological writers of late antiquity, who also employed a specialized vocabulary for parts of the reproductive organs.

Both women and men often removed their pubic hair, but grooming may have varied over time and by individual preference. A fragment from the early satirist Lucilius refers to penetrating a "hairy bag", and a graffito from Pompeii declares that "a hairy cunt is fucked much better than one which is smooth; it's steamy and wants cock".

At the entrance to a caldarium in the bath complex of the House of Menander at Pompeii, an unusual graphic device appears on a mosaic: a phallic oil can is surrounded by strigils in the shape of female genitalia, juxtaposed with an "Ethiopian" water-bearer who has an "unusually large and comically detailed" penis.

==== Breasts ====
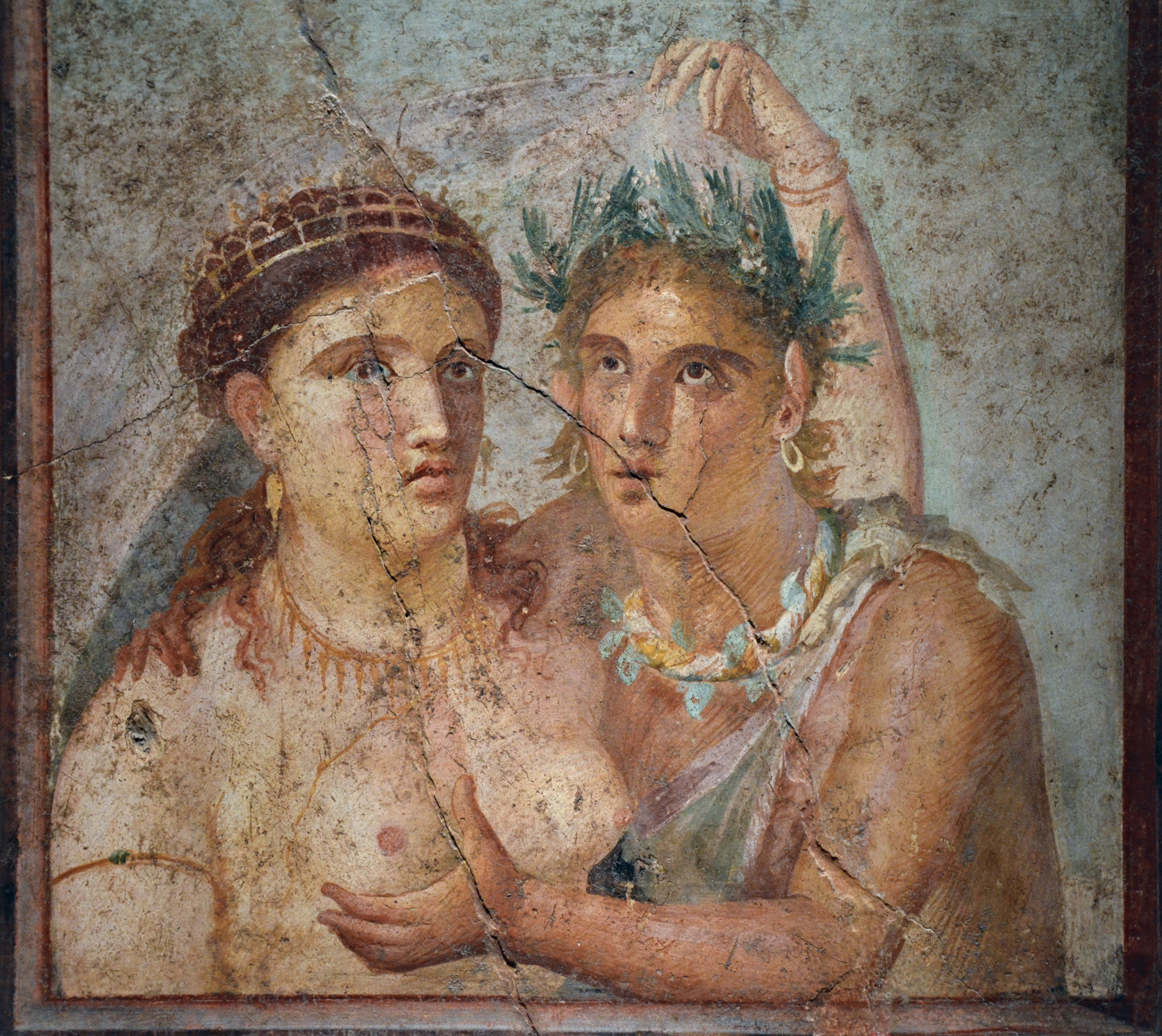
Pompeiian wall painting (Secret Museum, Naples)

Latin words for "breasts" include mammae (cf. English "mammary"), papillae (more specifically for "nipples"), and ubera, breasts in their capacity to provide nourishment, including the teats or udder of an animal. (Note: Breasts are never ubera in Ovid's Amores, but are ubera throughout the Metamorphoses: at 3.31 (metaphorically); 4.324; 10.392; 9.358 (materna ... ubera, "motherly breasts"); 7.321 and 6.342 (lactantia ubera, "milk-producing breasts"); 15.117 and 472. Uber (singular) or ubera is used for animals by Ovid, Ars Amatoria 1.350 (the udder of a cow) and 2.375 (the teats of lactating dogs); by Horace, Sermones 1.1.110, Odes 2.19.10, 4.4.14 and 4.15.5, and elsewhere; by Tibullus, for sheep in 1.3.45; by Propertius, 2.34b.) Papillae is the preferred word when Catullus and the Augustan poets take note of breasts in an erotic context.

The breasts of a beautiful woman were supposed to be "unobtrusive." Idealized breasts in the tradition of Hellenistic poetry were compared to apples; Martial makes fun of large breasts. Old women who were stereotypically ugly and undesirable in every way had "pendulous" breasts. On the Roman stage, exaggerated breasts were part of the costuming for comically unattractive female characters, since in classic Roman comedy women's roles were played by male actors in drag.

While Greek epigrams describe ideal breasts, Latin poets take limited interest in them, at least as compared to the modern focus on admiring and fondling a woman's breasts. They are observed mainly as aspects of a woman's beauty or perfection of form, though Ovid finds them inviting to touch. In one poem celebrating a wedding, Catullus remarks on the bride's "tender nipples" (teneris ... papillis), which would keep a good husband sleeping with her; erotic appeal supports fidelity within marriage and leads to children and a long life together.

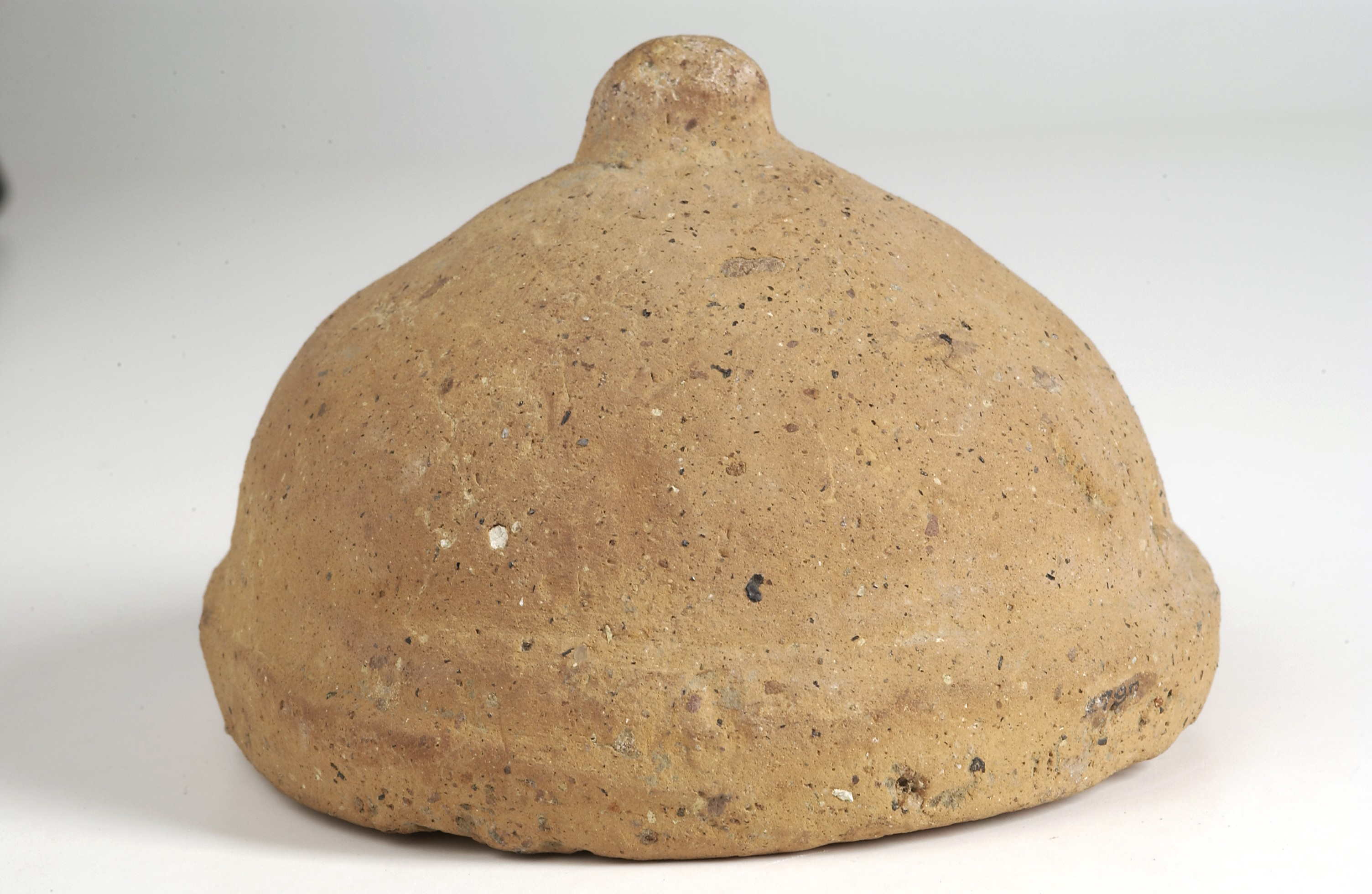
Baked-clay votive breast

Because all infants were breastfed in antiquity, the breast was viewed primarily as an emblem of nurturing and of motherhood. Mastoi, breast-shaped drinking cups, and representations of breasts are among the votive offerings (vota) found at sanctuaries of deities such as Diana and Hercules, sometimes having been dedicated by wet nurses. The breast-shaped cup may have a religious significance; the drinking of breast milk by an adult who is elderly or about to die symbolized potential rebirth in the afterlife. In the Etruscan tradition, the goddess Juno (Uni) offers her breast to Hercules as a sign that he may enter the ranks of the immortals. The religious meaning may underlie the story of how Pero offered breast milk to her elderly father when he was imprisoned and sentenced to death by starvation (see Roman Charity). Pliny records medicinal uses of breast milk, and ranks it as one of the most useful remedies, especially for ailments of the eyes and ears. Wrapping one's head in a bra was said to cure a headache.

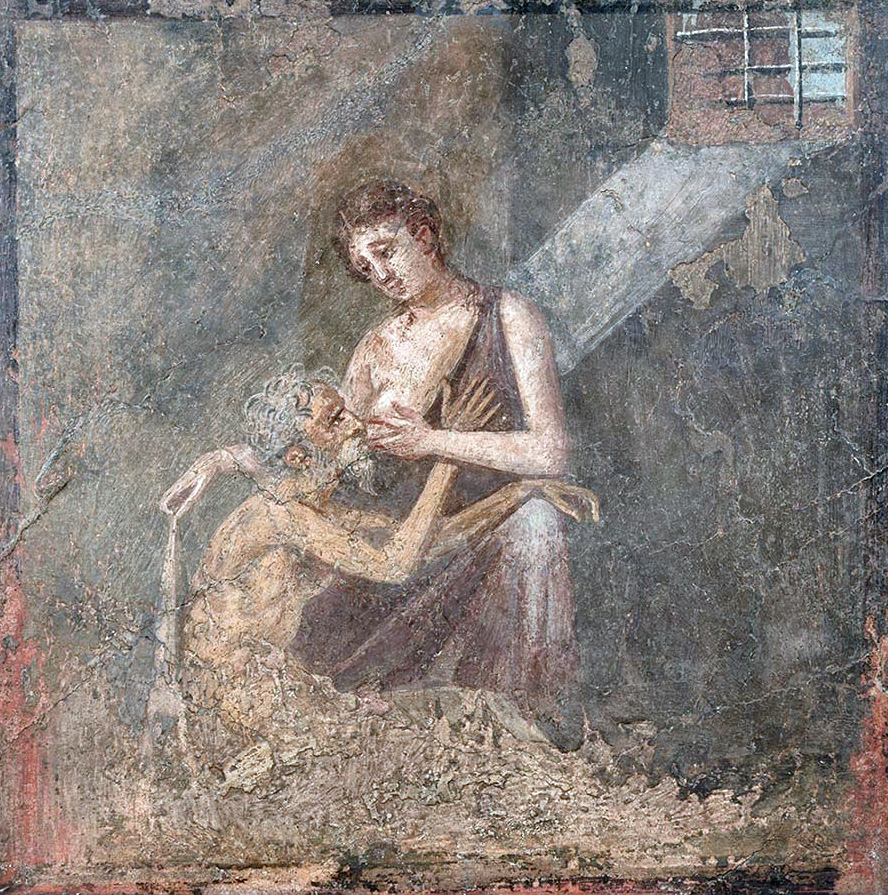
Pero offering her breast milk to her aged father in an act of "Roman Charity"

Baring the breasts is one of the gestures made by women, particularly mothers or nurses, to express mourning or as an appeal for mercy. The baring and beating of breasts ritually in grief was interpreted by Servius as producing milk to feed the dead. In Greek and Latin literature, mythological mothers sometimes expose their breasts in moments of extreme emotional duress to demand that their nurturing role be respected. Breasts exposed with such intensity held apotropaic power. Julius Caesar indicates that the gesture had a similar significance in Celtic culture: during the siege of Avaricum, the female heads of household (matres familiae) expose their breasts and extend their hands to ask that the women and children be spared. Tacitus notes Germanic women who exhorted their reluctant men to valorous battle by aggressively baring their breasts. Although in general "the gesture is meant to arouse pity rather than sexual desire", the beauty of the breasts so exposed is sometimes in evidence and remarked upon.

Because women were normally portrayed clothed in art, bared breasts can signify vulnerability or erotic availability by choice, accident, or force. Baring a single breast was a visual motif of Classical Greek sculpture, where among other situations, including seductions, it often represented impending physical violence or rape. Some scholars have attempted to find a "code" in which exposing the right breast had an erotic significance, while the left breast signified nurturing. Although art produced by the Romans may imitate or directly draw on Greek conventions, during the Classical period of Greek art images of women nursing were treated as animalistic or barbaric; by contrast, the coexisting Italic tradition emphasized the breast as a focus of the mother–child relationship and as a source of female power.

The erogenous power of the breast was not utterly neglected: in comparing sex with a woman to sex with a boy, a Greek novel of the Roman Imperial era notes that "her breast when it is caressed provides its own particular pleasure". Propertius connects breast development with girls reaching an age to "play". Tibullus observes that a woman just might wear loose clothing so that her breasts "flash" when she reclines at dinner. An astrological tradition held that mammary intercourse was enjoyed by men born under the conjunction of Venus, Mercury, and Saturn. Even in the most sexually explicit Roman paintings, the breasts are sometimes covered by the strophium (breast band). The women so depicted may be prostitutes, but it can be difficult to discern why an artist decides in a given scenario to portray the breasts covered or exposed.

=== Female–female sex ===
Greek words for a woman who prefers sex with another woman include hetairistria (compare hetaira, "courtesan" or "companion"), tribas (plural tribades), and Lesbia; Latin words include the loanword tribas, fricatrix ("she who rubs"), and virago. References to sex between women are infrequent in the Roman literature of the Republic and early Principate. Ovid, who advocates generally for a heterosexual lifestyle, finds it "a desire known to no one, freakish, novel ... among all animals no female is seized by desire for female"—and yet Ovid's story of Iphis and Ianthe in the Metamorphoses (9.666–797) is "the most extended surviving account in ancient literature of female-female desire." Ovid's narrative of Callisto, a follower of Diana, the goddess who actively shunned the company of men, is rich with homoerotic implications, as Callisto is seduced by Jove only because he disguises himself as Diana.

During the Roman Imperial era, sources for same-sex relations among women are more abundant, including in the form of love spells, medical writing, and texts on astrology and the interpretation of dreams. A graffito from Pompeii (CIL 4.5296) expresses the desire of one woman for another:

I wish I could hold to my neck and embrace the little arms, and bear kisses on the tender lips. Go on, doll, and trust your joys to the winds; believe me, light is the nature of men.

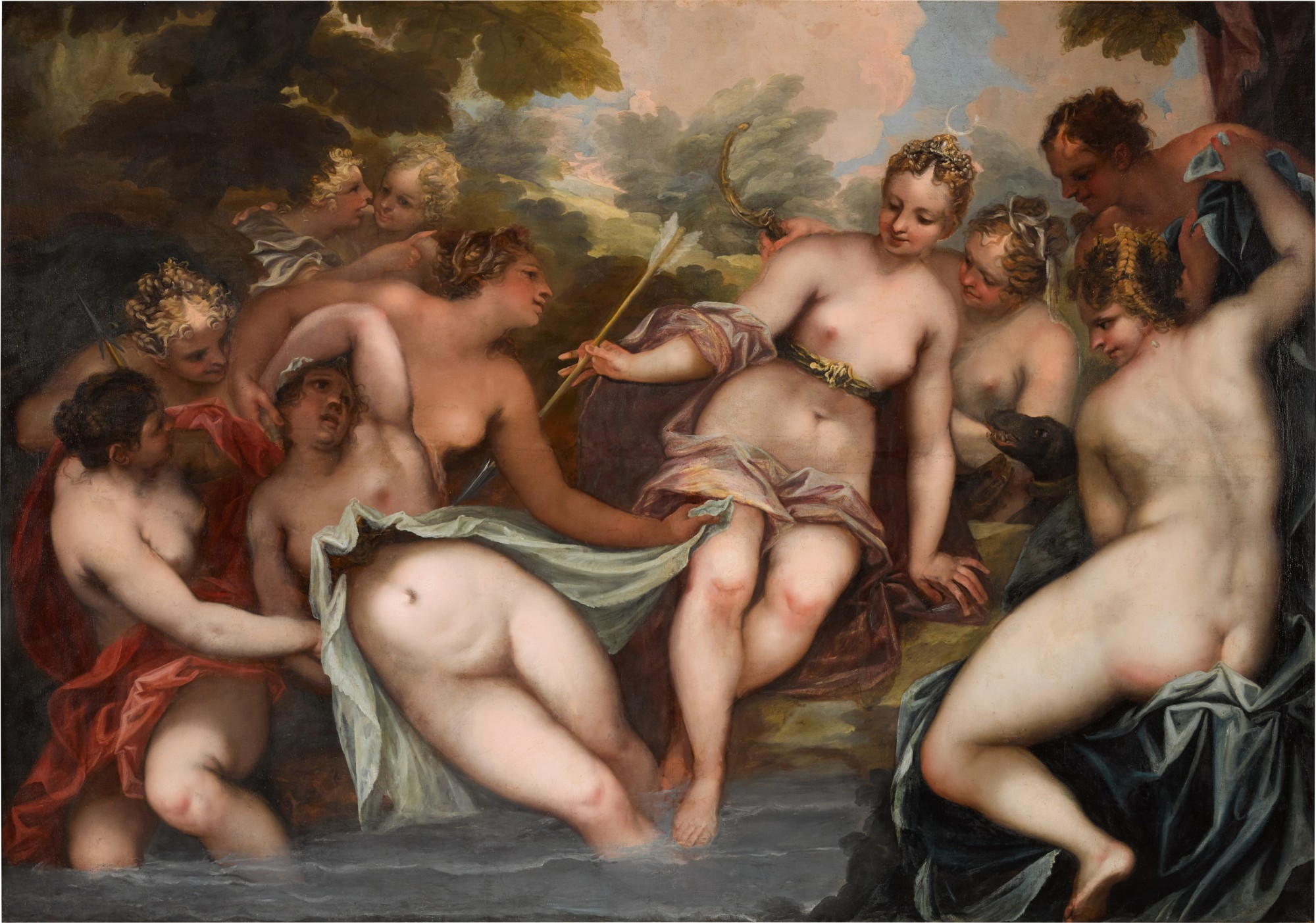
Scenes of Diana and a woodland coterie, such as this Diana and Callisto (1658/59) on a theme Pietro Liberi often painted, became opportunities in the classical tradition to explore fleshy female homosociality

An early reference to same-sex relations among women as "lesbianism", owing to Sappho of Lesbos, is found in Lucian (2nd century AD): "They say there are women like that in Lesbos, masculine-looking, but they don't want to give it up for men. Instead, they consort with women, just like men."

Since Romans thought a sex act required an active or dominant partner who was "phallic", male writers imagined that in lesbian sex one of the women would use a dildo or have an exceptionally large clitoris for penetration, and that she would be the one experiencing pleasure. The dildo is rarely mentioned in Roman sources, but was a popular comic item in Classical Greek literature and art. Martial describes lesbians as having outsized sexual appetites and performing penetrative sex on both women and boys. Imperial portrayals of women who sodomize boys, drink and eat like men, and engage in vigorous physical regimens, may reflect cultural anxieties about the growing independence of Roman women.

=== Rape ===
==== Mythology of rape ====
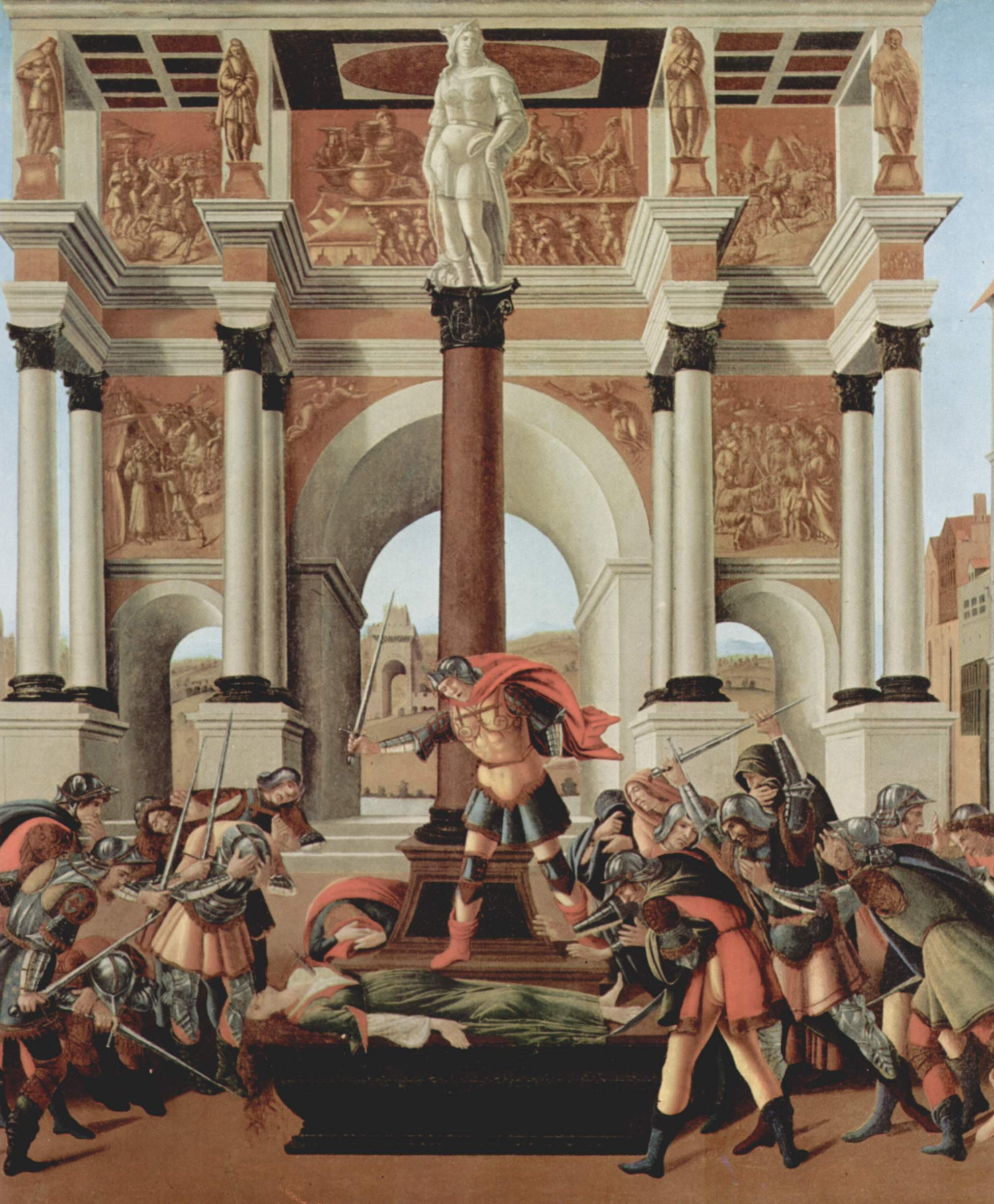
Botticelli's Death of Lucretia (c. 1500): in Roman legend, Lucretia's rape and suicide brought about the overthrow of the monarchy and the formation of the Roman Republic

The rape of women is a pervasive theme in the myths and legends of early Rome. The legendary founders Romulus and Remus were born from the rape of the Vestal Rhea Silvia by the god Mars. Romulus and his "band of freebooters" can transform their all-male settlement into a city only by the "rape" of the Sabine women, that is, by forcibly abducting the daughters of their Sabine neighbors to take as wives. The overthrow of the Roman monarchy and the establishment of the Republic was precipitated by the rape of the much-admired Lucretia by Sextus Tarquinius, the king's son. The legend crystallizes the Roman view of unchecked libido as a form of tyranny.

The Augustan historian Livy seems "embarrassed" by the rape motif of early Roman history, and emphasizes the redeeming political dimension of these events. Lucretius condemns rape as a primitive behavior outside the bounds of an advanced civilization, describing it as "a man's use of violent force and imposition of sexual impulse".

==== Rape and the law ====
Roman law recognized rape as a crime: the rape victim was not guilty of anything. Intercourse by force or compulsion (vis), even if it took place under circumstances that were otherwise unlawful for a woman (see "Moral and legal concepts" above), left the woman legally without blame. The official position under Diocletian (reigned 284–305 AD) held that:

The laws punish the foul wickedness of those who prostitute their modesty to the lusts of others, but they do not attach blame to those who are compelled to stuprum by force, since it has, moreover, been quite properly decided that their reputations are unharmed and that they are not prohibited from marriage to others.

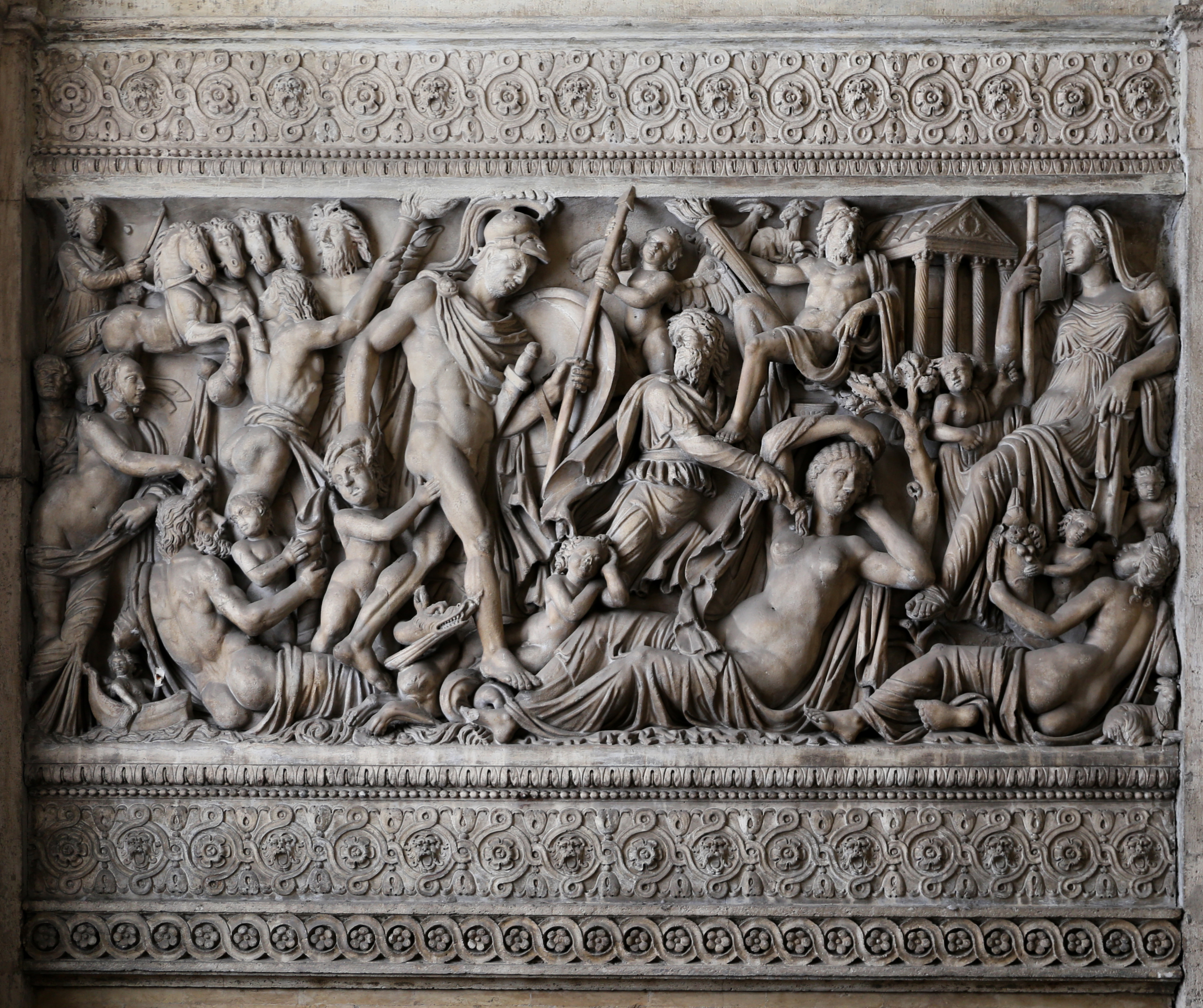
Rape was embedded in the most familiar founding myth of Rome: Romulus and Remus were born from the rape of Rhea Silvia by the god Mars (Roman sarcophagus, 3rd century CE)

Although literary sources from the Republican era make it clear that rape was wrong and severely penalized, the statutes under which it might be charged as a crime are unknown until passage of the Lex Iulia de vi publica, dating probably to the dictatorship of Julius Caesar in the 40s BC. Rome had no state prosecutors; cases could be prosecuted by any citizen with the legal expertise and speaking ability to do so. Since emancipated women were allowed to bring criminal prosecutions in the Republic, it is conceivable that a rape victim could have brought charges against her rapist herself. Otherwise, the case could be prosecuted by her father or husband, or by anyone who saw fit to do so. There was no statute of limitations for rape; by contrast adultery, which was criminalized under Augustus, had to be prosecuted within five years. Rape was a capital crime.

As a matter of law, rape could be committed only against a citizen in good standing. A woman who worked as a prostitute or entertainer lost her social standing and became infamis; by making her body publicly available, she had in effect surrendered her right to be protected from sexual abuse or physical violence. Cicero defended a client whose misdeeds included the gang rape of an actress on the grounds that young men took customary license with entertainers. The rape of a slave could be prosecuted only as damage to her owner's property, under the Lex Aquilia. Consent would have been an issue in rape cases only rarely; if the accused argued that the woman had consented, he could still be charged with committing the more general sex crime of stuprum against a citizen, since male sexual freedom was limited to prostitutes or slaves. If rape against a married woman could not be proven, the Augustan legislation criminalizing adultery would make the man liable to a charge of adulterium, criminal adultery, though a charge of either adultery or stuprum without force would implicate the woman as well. An acquittal for rape, as with any other crime, would open the prosecutor to a retaliatory charge of calumnia, malicious prosecution. The prosecution of rape might also be hindered by psychological and social pressures, such as embarrassment or a reluctance to expose one's private life.

Attitudes toward rape changed when the Empire became Christianized. St. Augustine interpreted Lucretia's suicide as a possible admission that she had secretly encouraged the rapist, (Note: Staples, p. 164, citing Norman Bryson, "Two Narratives of Rape in the Visual Arts: Lucretia and the Sabine Women," in Rape (Blackwell, 1986), p. 199. Augustine's interpretation of the rape of Lucretia (in City of God 1.19) has generated a substantial body of criticism, starting with Machiavelli's satire. In Augustine of Hippo: A Biography (Faber, 1967), Peter Brown characterized this section of Augustine's work as his most vituperative attack on Roman ideals of virtue. See also Carol J. Adams and Marie M. Fortune, Violence against Women and Children: A Christian Theological Sourcebook (Continuum, 1995), p. 219ff.; Melissa M. Matthes, The Rape of Lucretia and the Founding of Republics (Pennsylvania State University Press, 2000), p. 68ff. (also on Machiavelli); Virginia Burrus, Saving Shame: Martyrs, Saints, and Other Abject Subjects (University of Pennsylvania Press, 2008), p. 125ff.; Amy Greenstadt, Rape and the Rise of the Author: Gendering Intention in Early Modern England (Ashgate, 2009), p. 71; Melissa E. Sanchez, Erotic Subjects: The Sexuality of Politics in Early Modern English Literature (Oxford University Press, 2011), p. 93ff. Augustine defines sexual integrity (pudicitia) as a purely spiritual quality that physical defilement cannot taint; as indicated throughout this article, the Romans viewed rape and other forms of stuprum within a political context as crimes against the citizen's liberty.) and Christian apologists regarded her as having committed the sin of involuntary sexual pleasure. The first Christian emperor Constantine redefined rape as a public offense rather than as a private wrong. Earlier Roman law had blurred the line between abduction and elopement, since in either case it was the right of the paterfamilias to give or withhold his consent to his daughter's marriage that had been violated. The word raptus thus could refer to a successful seduction as well as abduction or rape. If the girl consented, Constantine ordered that she be punished along with the male "abductor" by being burnt alive. If she had not consented, she was still considered an accomplice, "on the grounds that she could have saved herself by screaming for help". As a participant to the rape, she was punished under law by being disinherited, regardless of the wishes of her family. Even if she and her family consented to a marriage as the result of an elopement, the marriage was legally void. In the Republic and the pre-Christian Empire, the consequences of an abduction or an elopement had been up to the couple and their families.

== Sexuality and children ==
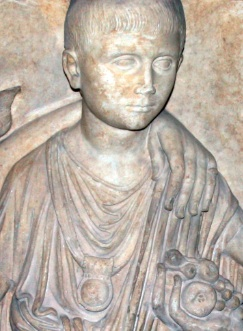
Roman boy wearing a bulla, which contained a phallic charm

Both male and female freeborn children wore the toga praetexta, a purple-bordered garment that marked its wearer as having "inviolable" status. An oath could be sworn upon the "sacred praetexta", a marker of how "we make sacred and venerable the weakness of childhood". It was religiously impermissible (nefas) to use obscene language in front of those wearing the praetexta, and Cato claimed that in front of his son he tried to speak as though Vestal Virgins were present.

Freeborn Roman boys also wore an apotropaic amulet called the bulla which incorporated a phallic talisman (fascinum) inside a locket of gold, silver, or bronze, or in a leather pouch. In addition to its magical function, the bulla would have been a visible warning that the boy was sexually off-limits. The equivalent for the girl was the lunula, a crescent moon amulet.

There were laws protecting freeborn children from sexual predators, and the rape of a freeborn boy was a capital crime; this severity was directed at protecting the integrity of the young citizen. Fictional license was not a defense; Valerius Maximus reports that a poetic boast of seducing a puer praetextatus ("praetextate boy") and a freeborn virgin (ingenua virgo) was used in court to impugn a prosecutor's moral authority. In denouncing the debaucheries of Quintus Apronius, Cicero builds to the worst offence: Apronius danced naked at a banquet in front of a boy still of an age to wear the praetexta. Although children were taken to dinner parties (convivia) to accustom them to proper adult social behavior, Quintilian scolds parents of his day for being poor role models: they parade their mistresses and male concubines and behave indiscreetly even when their children are present, and think it is cute when their children say things that are age-inappropriate. Quintilian regards this misbehavior as a sign of general moral decline. At weddings, however, boys were by ancient custom given license to speak obscenely, peppering the new couple with dirty jokes, as humor and laughter were thought to promote fertility.

Protections applied only to freeborn children, not those born to slaves, sold into slavery, or taken captive in war. The social acceptance of pederasty among the Romans was focused on the exploitation of young male slaves or prostitutes by men of the upper classes.

=== Rites of passage ===
Adolescents in ritual preparation to transition to adult status wore the tunica recta, the "upright tunic", so called because it was woven ritually on the type of upright loom that was the earliest used by Romans. The tunic, worn by both youths and maidens, may have had the purple band of inviolability, though this is unclear from the evidence. Girls wove their own tunica recta.

The puberty ritual for the young male involved shaving his first beard and taking off his bulla, which he dedicated to the household gods, the Lares. He assumed the toga virilis ("toga of manhood"), was enrolled as a citizen on the census, and soon began his military service. Traditionally, the ceremony was held on the Liberalia, the festival in honor of the god Liber, who embodied both political and sexual liberty. Following his rite of passage, the young male citizen was permitted the avenues of sexual activity that were generally acceptable for Roman men of his social rank. Often a young man would be introduced to heterosexual intercourse by an experienced female prostitute.

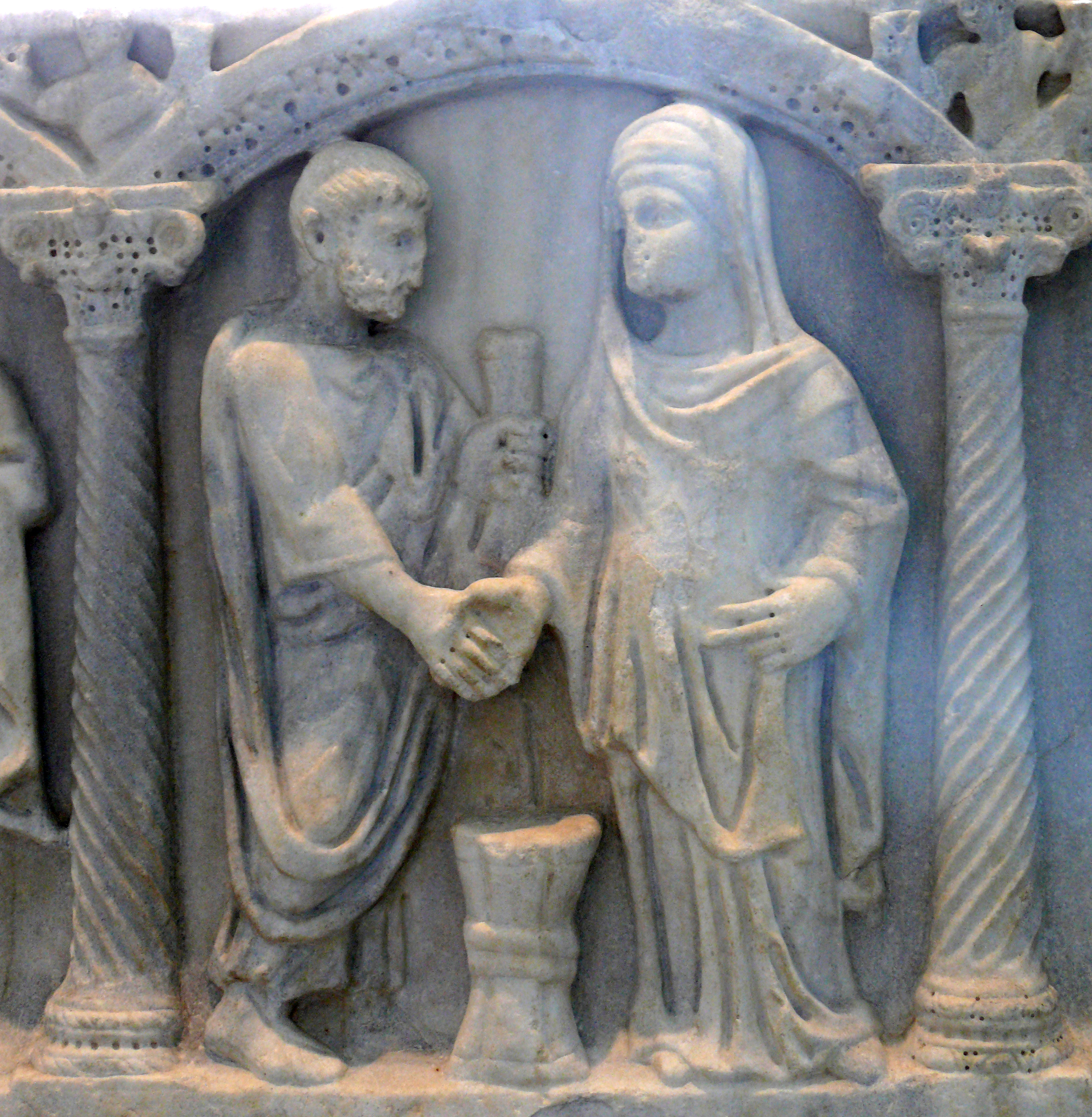
Roman couple joining hands; the knot in a bride's belt, symbolizing that her husband was "belted and bound" to her, was to be untied by him on the wedding night (from a 4th-century sarcophagus)

Roman women were expected to remain virgins until marriage; the higher a girl's social rank, the earlier she was likely to become betrothed and married. The usual age of betrothal for upper classes girls was 14, but for patricians as early as 12. Weddings were often postponed until the girl was considered mature enough. The wedding ceremony was in part a rite of passage for the bride, as Rome lacked the elaborate female puberty rituals of ancient Greece. On the night before the wedding, the bride bound up her hair with a yellow hairnet she had woven. The confining of her hair signified the harnessing of her sexuality within marriage. Her weaving of the tunica recta and the hairnet demonstrated her skill and her capacity for acting in the traditional matron's role as custos domi, "guardian of the house". On her wedding day, she belted her tunic with the cingulum, made of ewe wool to symbolize fertility, and tied with the "knot of Hercules", which was supposed to be difficult to untie. The knot symbolized wifely chastity, in that it was to be untied only by her husband, but the cingulum also symbolized that the groom was bound to his wife. The bride's hair was ritually styled in "six tresses" (seni crines), and she was veiled until uncovered by her husband at the end of the ceremony, a ritual of surrendering her virginity to him.

== Sex, marriage, and society ==
=== Marital sex ===
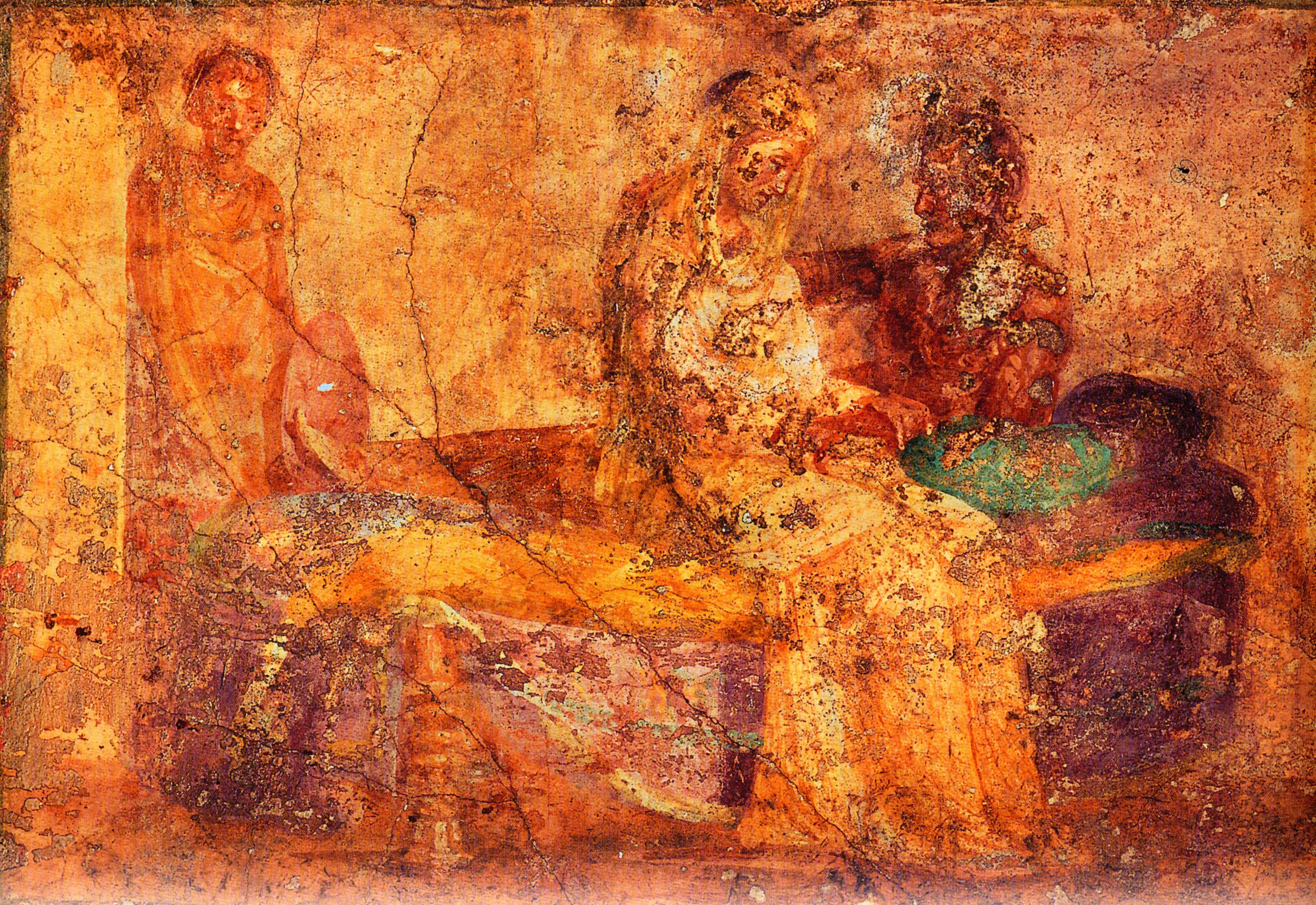
Newlyweds attended by a servant: the bride remains fully clothed and demur (c. 19 BC, from the bedroom wall of a villa excavated in Trastevere)

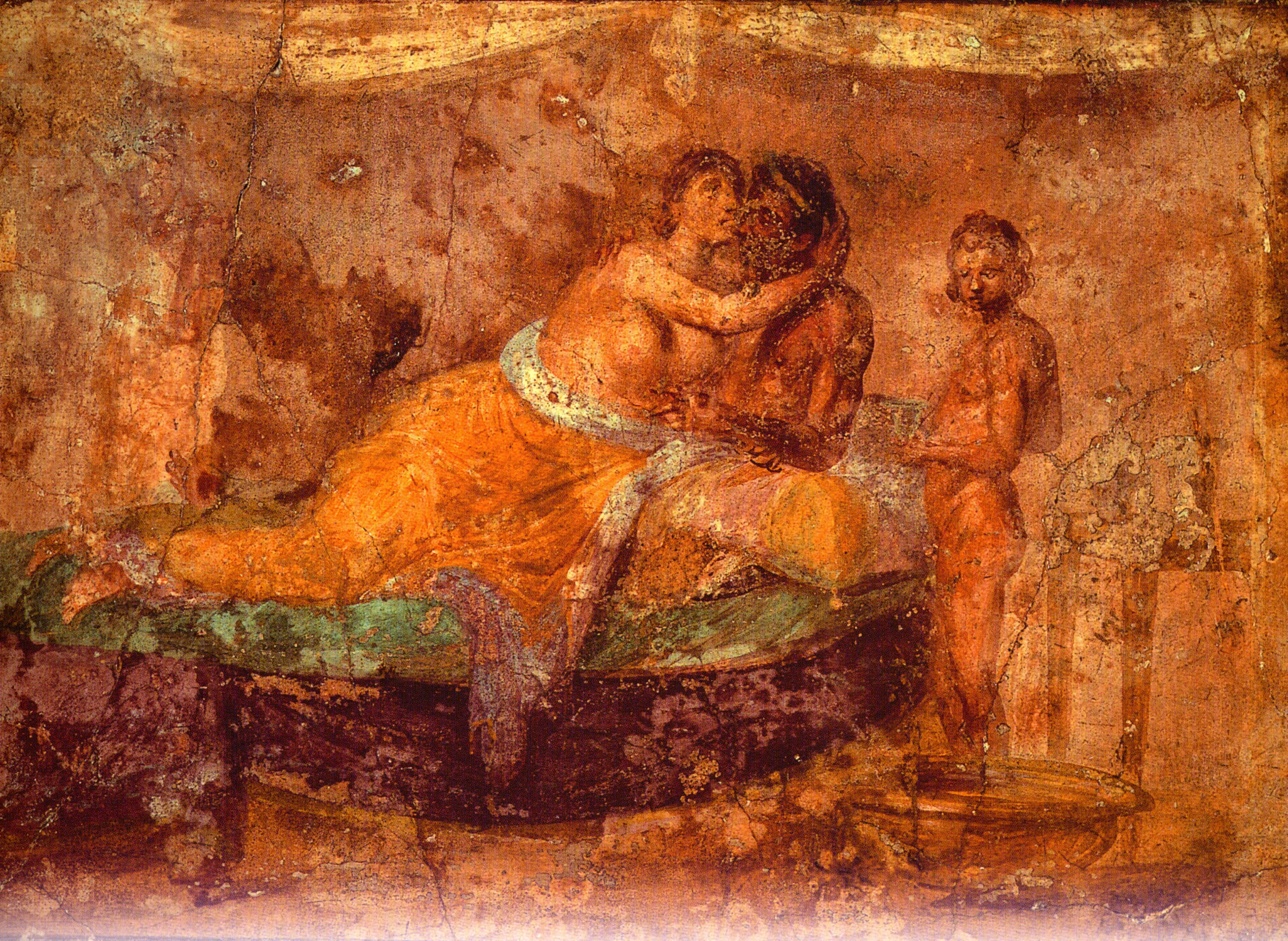
In an accompanying scene, the bride shows her growing agency as a nude slave looks on

Because men could enjoy sexual relations outside marriage with relative impunity, it has sometimes been assumed that satisfying sex was not an expectation of Roman marriage. The jurist Ulpian noted that "it is not sexual intercourse that makes a marriage but rather marital affection", but the warnings by moralists and philosophers against a preoccupation with sex within marriage recognize the potential for marital passion. While having children was a primary goal of marriage, other social and familial bonds were enhanced, not excluding personal companionship and sexual pleasure between husband and wife, as indicated by marriages involving women past their childbearing years.

Sexual intimacy between a married couple was a private matter, and not usually the subject of literature. An exception was the epithalamium, a genre of poetry that celebrated a wedding. A wedding hymn by Catullus, for instance, praises the love goddess Venus because "nothing is possible without you". Ovid, whose love poetry early in his career was directed at fictional mistresses, wrote elegies during his exile in which he longed for his wife. Among the collected letters of Pliny Minor is one he writes about his feelings for his wife:

I am seized by an unbelievable longing for you. The reason is above all my love, but secondarily the fact that we are not used to being apart. This is why I spend the greater part of the night haunted by your image; this is why from time to time my feet lead me (the right expression!) of their own accord to your room at the times I was accustomed to frequent you; this is why, in short, I retreat, morbid and disconsolate, like an excluded lover from an unwelcoming doorway.

Pliny adopts the rhetoric of love poetry, conventionally directed at an illicit or hard-to-attain lover, as appropriate for expressing his wedded desire.

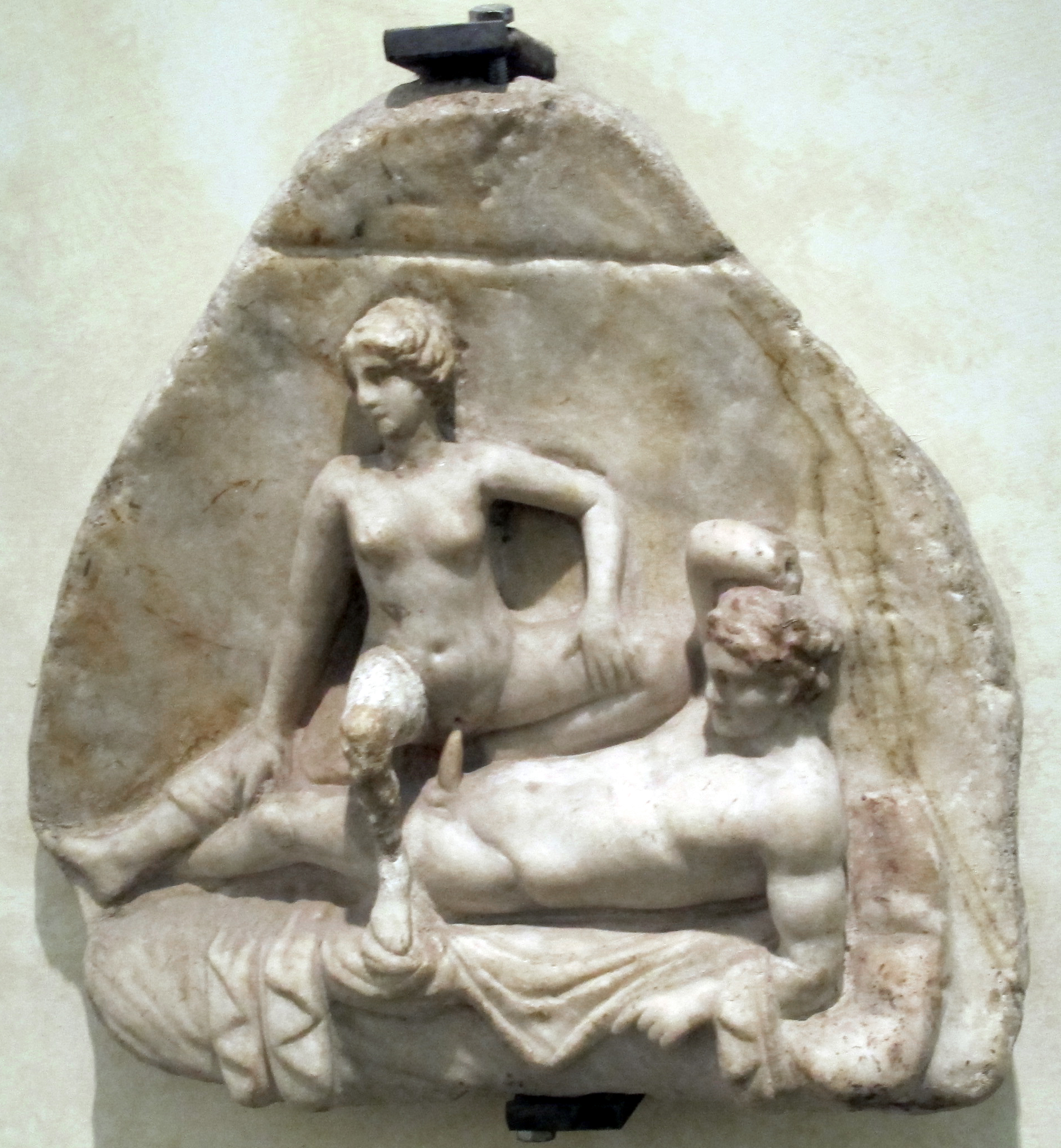
The woman "riding" in a marble bas-relief from Pompeii (National Archaeological Museum, Naples) 1st century CE

The Trojan royal couple Hector and Andromache became a mythological trope of wedded sex. Latin love elegy focuses on their sex life rather than the tragic end of their marriage with Hector's death at the hands of Achilles. They were known for the "woman on top" position, with a verb suggesting that the woman "rides" the man like a horse. In general, Hector was portrayed as markedly heterosexual and an exemplary husband.

==== Wedding night ====
An epithalamium by Catullus paints the wedding night as a time of ripe eroticism, spiced with humorous and bawdy songs from the guests. "Look inside," the poet advises the bride, who burns with an "intimate flame", "where your man lies on the richly arrayed bed, completely available to you". The husband is reminded that "good Venus" has blessed him, since he can now desire openly what he desires, and need not conceal a "good love". The couple is encouraged to enjoy themselves as they please (ludite ut lubet); the goal is to produce children soon.

A pair of paintings in a bedroom of the Casa della Farnesina has been interpreted as "a narrative of the modest bride becoming the immodest lover—perhaps fulfilling a ribald male fantasy".

==== Fidelity and adultery ====
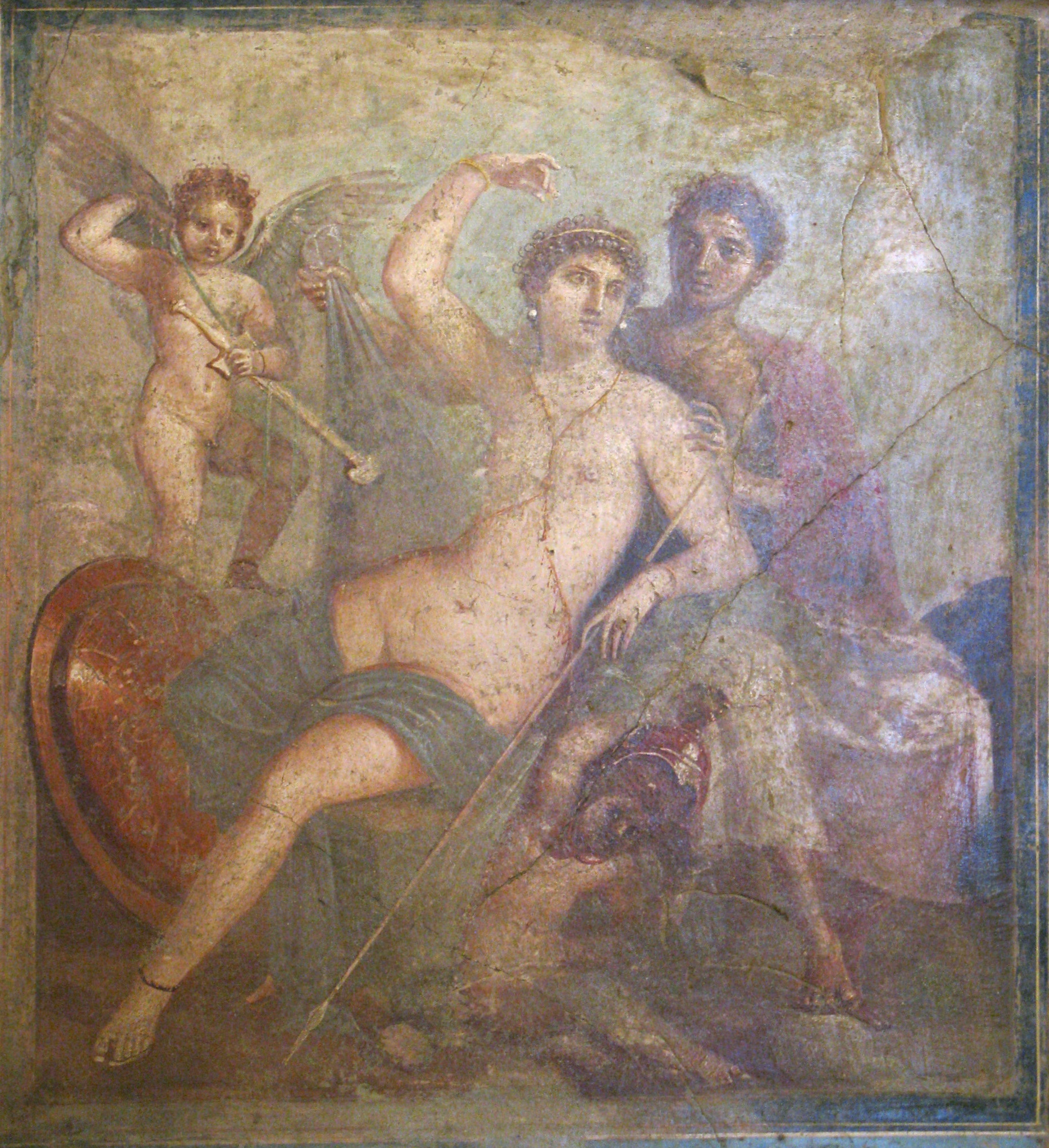
The mythological adultery of Venus and Mars, here attended by Cupid, was a popular subject for painting

Some literary passages suggest that a newlywed might break off his outside sexual relations for a time and focus on bonding with his wife in the hope of starting a family. Some Stoics maintained that marital fidelity was as much a virtue for men as for women (see "Stoic sexual morality" above). Legally, however, a Roman husband did not commit adultery when he had sex outside marriage as long as his partner was considered sexually available; sexual misconduct (stuprum) was adultery depending on the status of a female partner. A character in a play by Plautus expresses a man's sexual freedom in comic terms:

No one prohibits anyone from going down the public way (publica via); as long as you do not make a path through posted land, as long as you hold off from brides, single women, maidens, the youth and free boys, love whatever you want.

A married or marriageable woman and young male citizens are off-limits, just as if they were the property of someone else, and in fact adultery as a crime was committed contrary to the rights of the paterfamilias to control his household. For a man, adultery was a sexual offense committed with a woman who was neither his wife nor a permissible partner such as a prostitute or slave, in effect when his female partner was another man's wife or his unmarried daughter. The later jurists emphasize that adulterium in the strict sense was committed with a married woman.

For a married woman, no infidelity was acceptable, and first-time brides were expected to be virgins. According to Cato (2nd century BC), a husband had an ancient right (ius) to kill his wife if he caught her in the act of adultery, but if this "right" existed, it was a matter of custom and not statute law. In the Republic, adultery was normally considered a private matter for families to deal with, not a serious criminal offense requiring the attention of the courts. No source records justified killing of a woman for adultery by either a father or husband during the Republican era, though adultery was grounds for divorce.

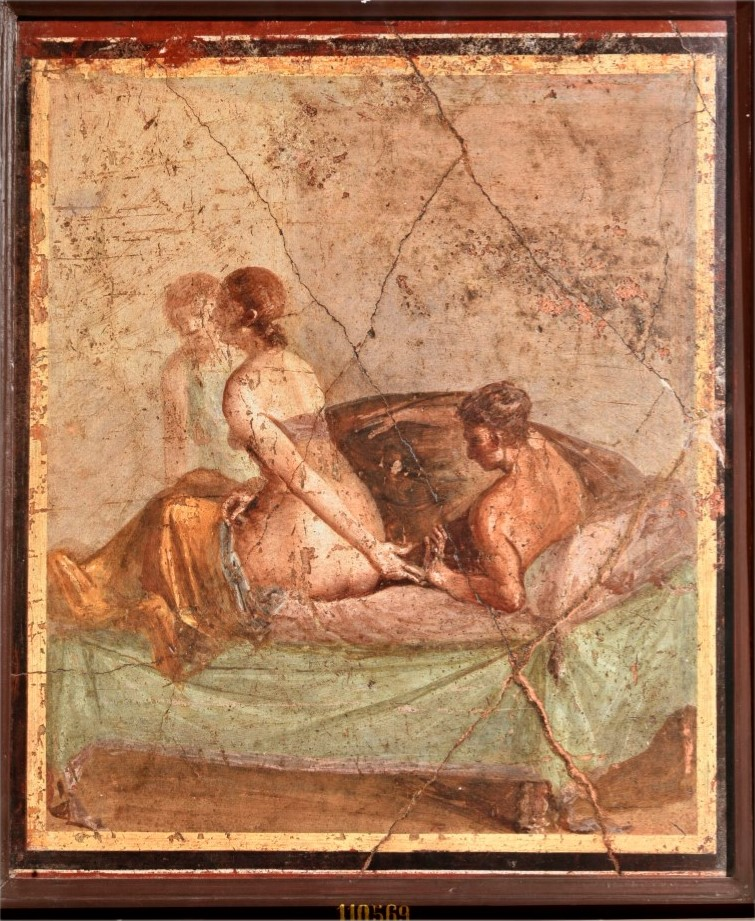
Wall painting from Pompeii (50–79 CE)

Following the collapse of the Republic, moral legislation became part of the new political order under Rome's first emperor, Augustus. Laws pertaining to adultery passed in 18 BC were part of his program to restore the mos maiorum, traditional social norms, while consolidating his political authority and codifying a more rigid social hierarchy in the wake of the recent civil wars. The appeal to old-fashioned values cloaked the radical overthrow of the Republic's participatory political institutions by top-down, one-man rule. The Lex Iulia de adulteriis ("Julian Law concerning acts of adultery") was directed at punishing married women who engaged in extra-marital affairs. Scholars have often assumed that the Lex Iulia was meant to address a virulent outbreak of adultery in the Late Republic. An androcentric perspective in the early 20th century held that the Lex Iulia had been "a very necessary check upon the growing independence and recklessness of women". A more sympathetic view in the late 20th to early 21st century saw love affairs as a way for the intelligent, independent women of the elite to form emotionally meaningful relationships outside marriages arranged for political purposes. It is possible, however, that no such epidemic of adultery even existed; the law should perhaps be understood not as addressing a real problem that threatened society, but as one of the instruments of social control exercised by Augustus that cast the state, and by extension himself, in the role of paterfamilias to all Rome.

Personal anxieties about infidelity, within marriage or not, are reflected in magic spells intended to "fix" (defixiones) or bind the other person's erotic attachment. Spells were also available for interrogating the beloved about fidelity. One magical papyrus from Roman Egypt recommends placing the heart of a hoopoe on a sleeping woman's genitals to induce truthful answers; another says that the tongue of a hen placed on her lips or breast will cause her to reveal the name of the man she loves.

Literature of the Late Republic and Principate, particularly the satires of Horace and Juvenal, offer various depictions, or perhaps fantasies, of how a wronged husband might subject his wife's lover to humiliation and punishment. In these literary treatments, the adulterer is castrated, beaten, raped by the husband himself or his slaves, or penetrated anally with a mullet, a type of prized fish cultivated by elite Romans as a leisure activity (otium). References to such acts do not appear in the letters of Cicero nor the histories of Tacitus, and may be fictional exaggerations. Ovid makes fun of the jealous husband as lacking in sophistication: "The man who's excessively wounded by his wife's adulterous affairs is a hick." Ovid's predecessor Catullus wrote poetry celebrating his adulterous affair with "Lesbia", his social superior, traditionally identified as Clodia. The cultivation of a laissez-faire attitude as a sign of urbanity may have prompted the provision of Augustus' adultery law that required a husband to divorce his wife and bring formal legal charges against her, or face charges himself for pimping (lenocinium).

=== Master-slave relations ===
Sexuality was a "core feature" of ancient Roman slavery. Because slaves were regarded as property under Roman law, an owner could use them for sex or hire them out to service other people. Some scholars interpret "intimate and affectionate" references Cicero's letters as indicating that he had a long-term homosexual relationship with his slave Tiro. As Eva Cantarella stated bluntly, "the Roman paterfamilias was an absolute master, ... he exercised a power outside any control of society and the state. In this situation why on earth should he refrain from sodomising his houseboys?" (Note: Martial (6.39) observed that the power of the paterfamilias was so absolute that having sex with his own son was technically not a transgression (nefas), as noted by John Boswell, Christianity, Social Tolerance, and Homosexuality: Gay People in Western Europe from the Beginning of the Christian Era to the Fourteenth Century (University of Chicago Press, 1980), p. 67.) In describing the ideal partner in pederasty, Martial prefers a slave boy who "acts more like a free man than his master", that is, one who can frame the affair as a stimulating game of courtship. But this form of sexual release thus held little erotic cachet: to use one's own slaves was "one step up from masturbation". When figures identifiable as slaves appear in erotic art, they are performing routine tasks in the background, not taking part in sex acts. In his work on the interpretation of dreams (c. 170 AD), Artemidorus takes a symbolic view of the sexual value of slaves: to dream of having sex with one's own female slave was a good thing, "for slaves are the dreamer's possession; therefore taking pleasure in them signifies the dreamer's being pleased with his own possessions".

A Roman could exploit his own slaves for sex, but was not entitled to compel any enslaved person he chose to have sex, since the owner had the right to control his own property. In the pursuit of sex with a slave who belonged to someone else, persuasion or threats might be employed. A charge of rape could not be brought against a free man who forced a slave to have sex, since a slave lacked the legal standing that protected a citizen's body, but the owner could prosecute the rapist under the Lex Aquilia, a law pertaining to property damage.

A slave's sexuality was closely controlled. Slaves had no right to legal marriage (conubium), though they could live together as husband and wife (contubernales). An owner usually restricted the heterosexual activities of his male slaves to females he also owned; any children born from these unions added to his wealth. Cato, at a time when Rome's large-scale slave economy was still in early development, thought it good practice to monitor his slaves' sex lives, and required male slaves to pay a fee for access to their female fellow slaves.

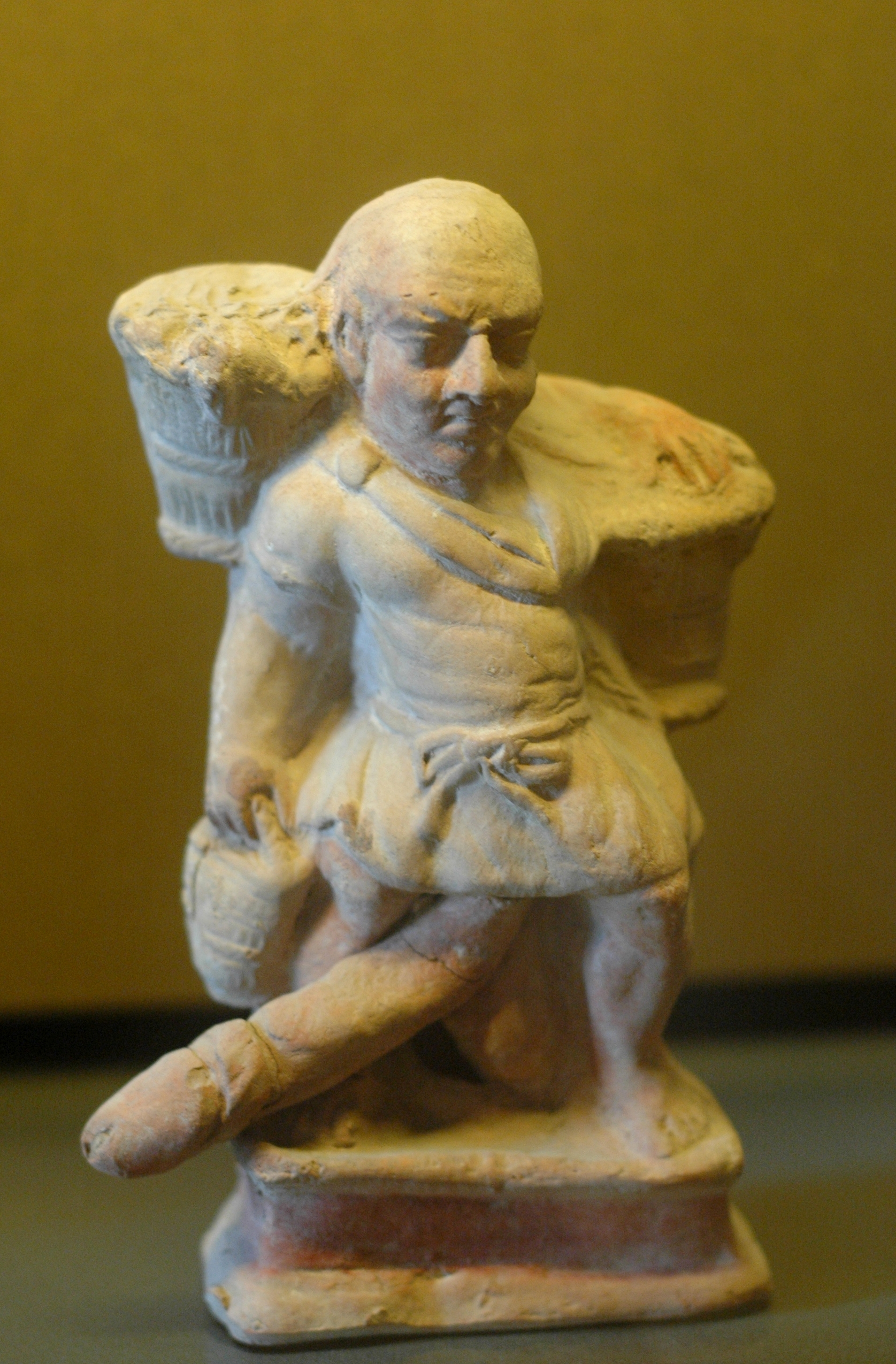
Grotesque figurine of an ithyphallic slave: in Roman comedy, slaves are often portrayed as oversexed

If an owner found that his male slave was having a sexual relationship with a free woman, the law required that he warn the couple three times to break it off. If the affair continued, he had the right to take ownership of the woman. References to women from respectable families having sex with a male slave are infrequent, indicating that male writers were not preoccupied with the risk of it. Cicero offers no examples in either the gossipy parts of his letters or in court cases where he attacks the reputation of a woman: he accuses Clodia of incest and of running her house like a brothel, but not of sleeping with slaves. Not even Messalina or Sallust's Sempronia is accused in the hostile sources of having sex with a slave. Sex with a slave was among the trumped-up charges against Claudia Octavia, the wife of Nero, when Poppaea Sabina campaigned to take her place, but mostly it was a matter for innuendo or insult against a husband who failed to prevent it.

Despite the external controls and restrictions placed on a slave's sexuality, Roman art and literature perversely often portray slaves as lascivious, voyeuristic, and even sexually knowing. One of the themes of Roman comedy that distinguishes it from its Greek models is the depiction of master-slave relations.

Freeborn Romans who fell into slavery were supposed to be protected from sexual exploitation, as indicated by two different stories recorded by ancient historians. Before the abolition of debt bondage in the 4th century BC, free Romans were sometimes driven to sell themselves or their children into slavery when they were overwhelmed by debt. According to Livy, debt slavery (nexum) was abolished as a direct result of the attempted sexual abuse of a freeborn youth who served as surety for his father's debt with the usurer Lucius Papirius. The boy, Gaius Publilius, was notably beautiful, and Papirius insisted that as a bond slave he was required to provide sexual services. When Publilius refused, Papirius had him stripped and whipped. The youth then took to the streets to display his injuries, and an outcry among the people led the consuls to convene the senate. The political process eventually led to the Lex Poetelia Papiria, which prohibited holding debtors in bondage for their debt and required instead that the debtor's property be used as collateral. The law thus established that the integrity of a Roman citizen's body was fundamental to the concept of libertas, political liberty, in contrast to the uses to which a slave's body was subject. (Note: The abolition of debt bondage was facilitated by the spread of chattel slavery for agricultural labor; thus during the period of Roman conquest and expansionism on the Italian peninsula, the distinction arises between a Roman citizen with rights and an "Italian" who might be enslaved; see John W. Rich, "Tiberius Gracchus, Land and Manpower," in Crises and the Roman Empire. Proceedings of the Seventh Workshop of the International Network Impact of Empire (Nijmegen, June 20–24, 2006) (Brill, 2007), p. 160.) In this and a similar incident reported by Valerius Maximus, corporal punishment and sexual abuse are seen as similar violations of the citizen's freedom from physical compulsion, in contrast to the slave's physical vulnerability. (Note: In the similar story from Valerius Maximus, a young man named Titus Veturius, whose father was a bankrupt Roman magistrate, had placed himself in slavery with Publius Plotius, who had attempted to seduce him (stuprare). When Veturius refused, Plotius whipped him. Veturius then complained to the consuls, who took the complaint to the senate. Plotius was jailed. See Cantarella, pp. 104–105)

Some sexual protections could be extended to slaves. The conduct of slaves reflected generally on the respectability of the household, and the materfamilias in particular was judged by her female slaves' sexual behavior, which was expected to be moral or at least discreet. This decorum may have limited the exploitation of female slaves that were part of the familia. Seneca expressed Stoic indignation that a male slave should be groomed effeminately and used sexually, because a slave's human dignity should not be debased. The burgeoning trade in eunuch slaves during the early Empire prompted legislation under the emperor Hadrian that prohibited the castration of a slave against his will "for lust or gain". Legal agreements on the sale of a slave might include a ne serva prostituatur covenant that prohibited the employment of the slave as a prostitute. Although concern for the slave's welfare may have been a factor in individual cases, this legal restriction seems also to have been intended to shield the male citizen owner from the shame or infamia associated with pimping and prostitution. The ne serva covenant remained in force for subsequent sales, even if the buyer was initially unaware of it, and if it was violated, the illegally prostituted slave was granted freedom.

=== Prostitution ===
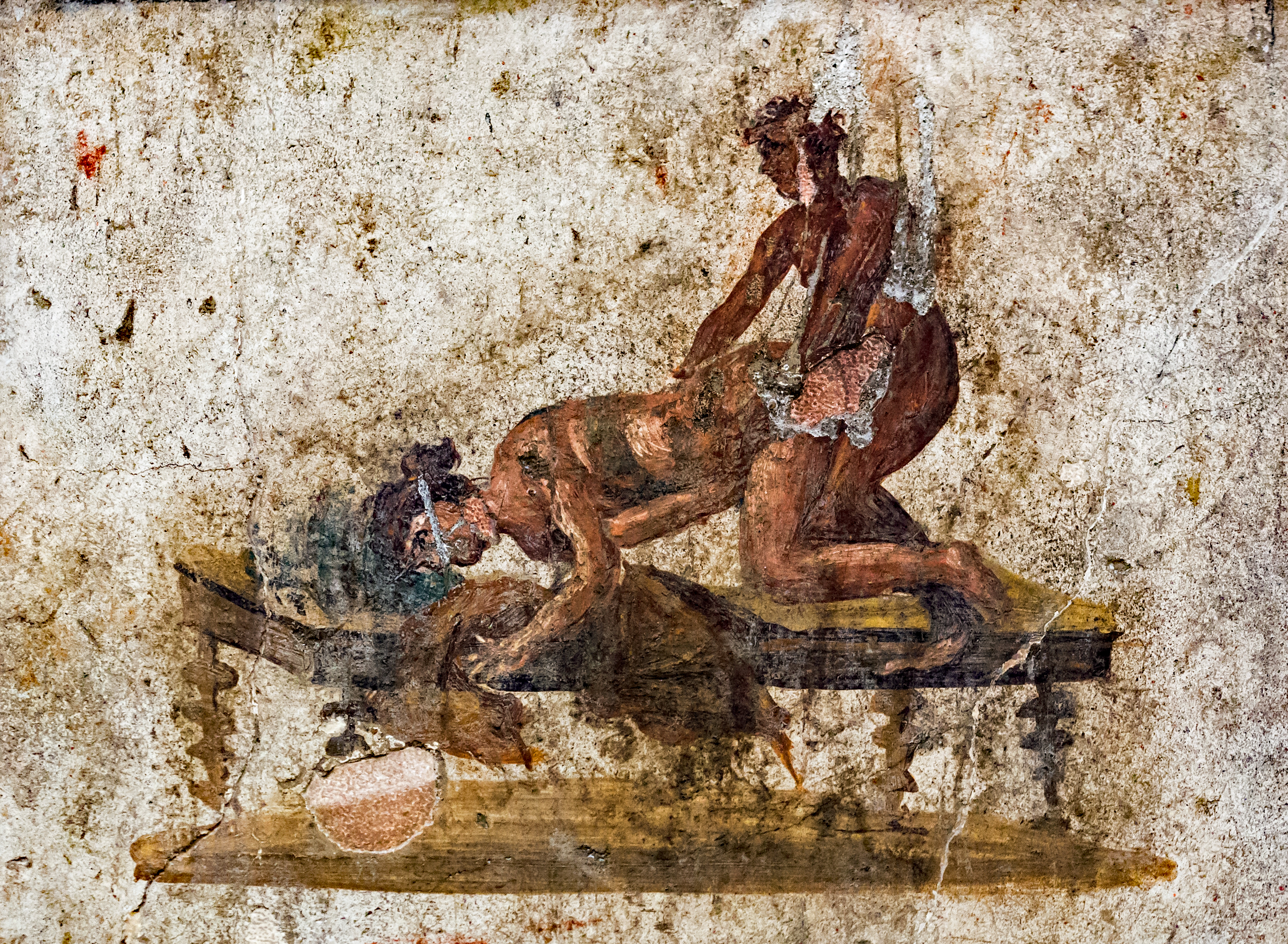
Wall painting from the lupanar (brothel) of Pompeii showing the use of a kline, an angled board for maintaining a position

Prostitution was legal throughout the Roman Empire in all periods. Most prostitutes were slaves or freedwomen. Prostitutes in Rome had to register with the aediles. Despite what might seem to be a clear distinction as a matter of law, the jurist Ulpian opined that an openly promiscuous woman brought the status of prostitute upon herself, even if she accepted no money. The Augustan moral legislation that criminalized adultery exempted prostitutes, who could legally have sex with a married man. Encouraged to think of adultery as a matter of law rather than morality, a few socially prominent women even chose to avoid prosecution for adultery by registering themselves as prostitutes.

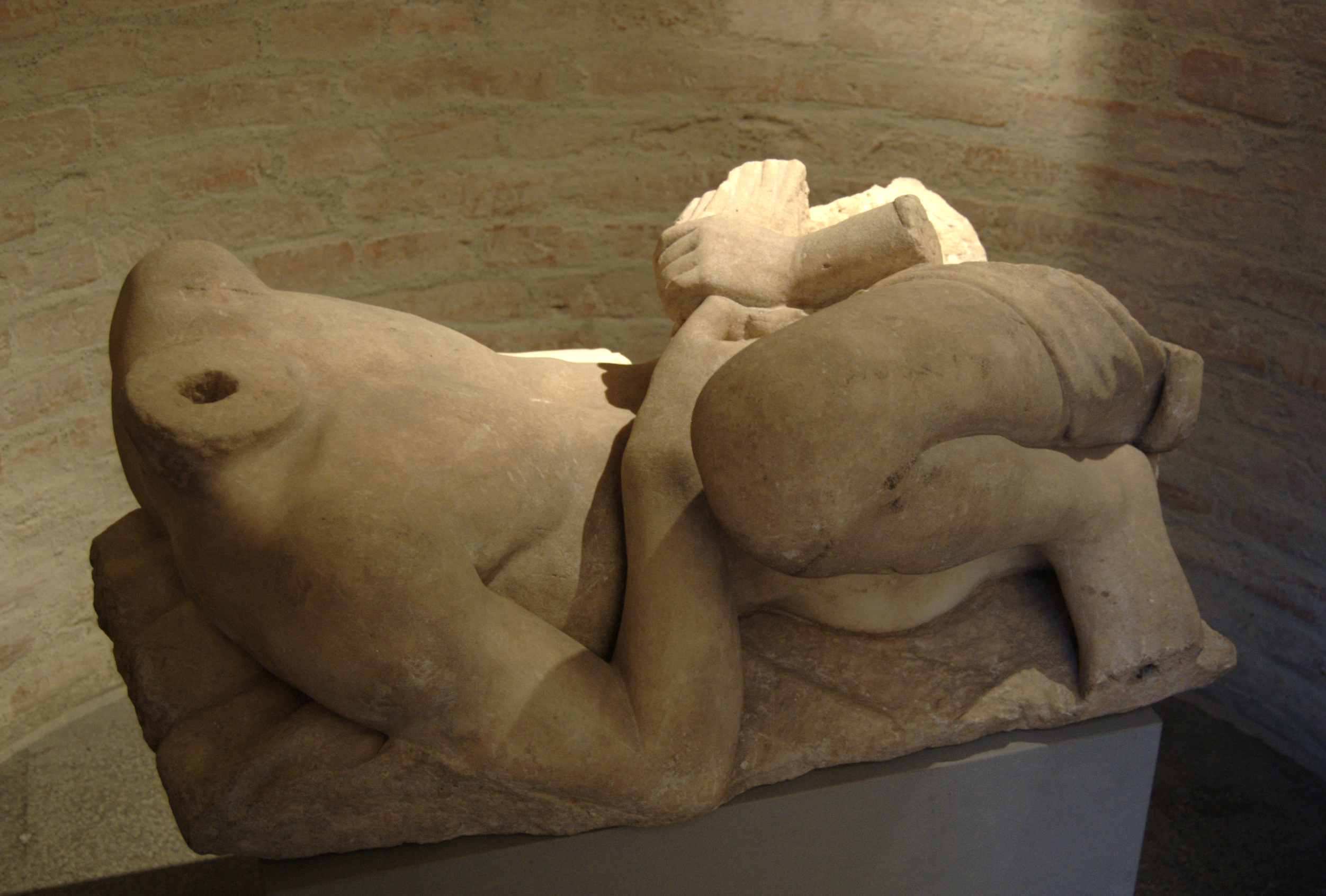
A prostitute having sex with a client; though fragmentary, an uncommonly found depiction of such a scene in sculpture (Glyptothek Museum, 1st century CE)

Prostitutes appear in erotic art in Pompeii and Herculaneum, including wall paintings from buildings identified as brothels, in which they are often nude except for a strapless bra (strophium). The paintings illustrate various sexual positions that contradict some scholarly claims about the preferences of Roman men in heterosexual acts. Literary sources record that prostitutes wore distinctive clothing, often gaudy dresses of see-through silk. They were the only Roman women who wore the toga, the distinctive dress of a free Roman male. This crossing of gender boundaries has been interpreted variously.

==== Pleasure and infamy ====
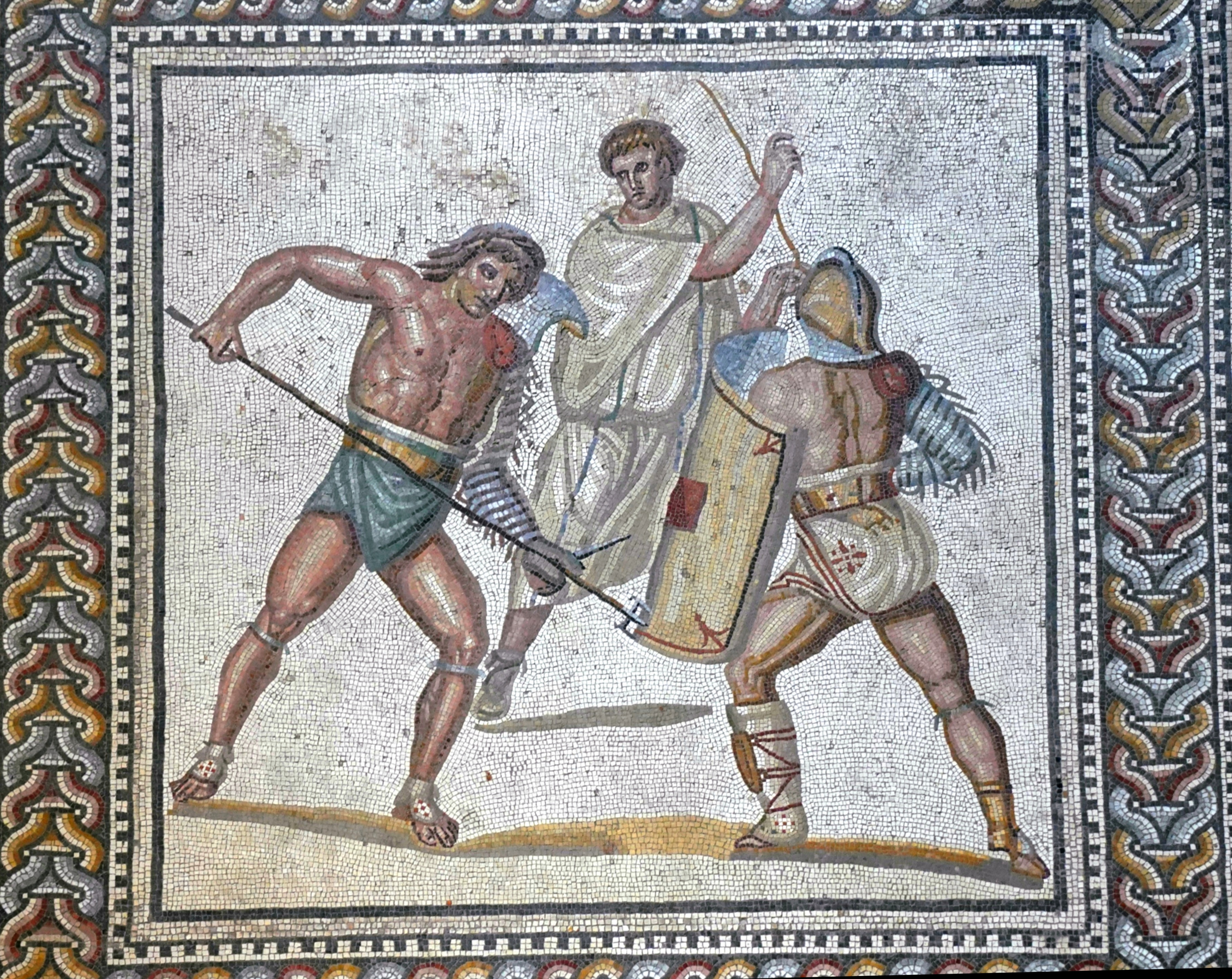
Juvenal thought the retiarius (left), a gladiator who fought with face and flesh exposed, was effeminate and prone to sexual deviance.

Roman ambivalence toward physical pleasure is expressed by the infamia of those whose bodies provided it publicly. In a technical sense, infamia was an official loss of legal standing for a freeborn person as a result of misconduct, including sexual misconduct, but the word could be used for ill repute in general. Infamia was an "inescapable consequence" of certain professions, including not only prostitutes and pimps but performers such as actors, dancers, and gladiators: "These figures were the objects of other people's desires. They served the pleasure of others. They were tarnished by exposure to the public gaze."

Those labeled infames (singular infamis) were liable to corporal punishment, usually reserved for slaves. Under the Republic and early Empire, one of the ways in which the citizen's liberty was defined was through the freedom of his body from physical coercion or punishment such as flogging by authorities. However, citizens who chose to become public performers and use their bodies to offer public pleasure were excluded from these physical protections, and could be beaten or otherwise subjected to violence. Any free man who became a gladiator took an oath to suffer branding, bondage, beating, and potential death by the sword. Both glamorized and despised, the gladiator was supposed to exert a compelling sexual allure over women.

Actors were sexually ambiguous, in part because they could imitate women, and were attractive to both men and women. The dictator Sulla had a long-term affair with an actor; Maecenas, the arts patron and advisor to Augustus, was in love with the actor Bathyllus; and women of the Imperial family are alleged to have had affairs with actors. Actresses were assumed to be prostitutes.

A man who enjoyed receiving anal sex or providing oral sex, often characterized as a cinaedus, might also be stigmatized as infamis, though if he was a citizen he could retain his legal standing.

==== Private sex clubs ====
Archaeological evidence, primarily from Pompeii and Herculaneum, and literary sources seem to indicate the existence of private "sex clubs" in some Roman homes (domūs). Most Romans lived in apartments (insulae); the domus was a large, independent dwelling owned by a family of considerable means, and in Rome was central to the family's social identity. A few of these residences have rooms decorated with pornographic art not differing from that found in identified brothels; in some cases, an erotically decorated room has its own exterior door to admit visitors who would normally enter the home through the main doors leading to the atrium, where the family displayed ancestral images and other trophies of respectability.

It has been suggested that these rooms were meant to evoke the ambiance of a brothel for the hosting of exclusive sex parties, such as the one described by the historian Valerius Maximus as occurring in 52 BC with a consul and the tribunes of the plebs in attendance:

Just as notorious was that party arranged for Metellus Scipio when he was consul and for the people's tribunes—by Gemellus, their tribunicial errand boy. He was a free man by birth, but twisted by his business to play the servant's role. Society gave a collective blush: he established a whorehouse in his own house, and pimped out Mucia and Flavia, each of them notable for her father and husband, along with the aristocratic boy Saturninus. Bodies in shameless submission, ready to come for a game of drunken sex! A banquet not for honoring consul and tribunes, but indicting them!

The existence of sex clubs may provide background for Late Republican political smears about public figures whose party guests included prostitutes, and for the notorious Imperial whorehouse Caligula established on the Palatine, where he prostituted married women and freeborn youths.

== Sex acts and positions ==
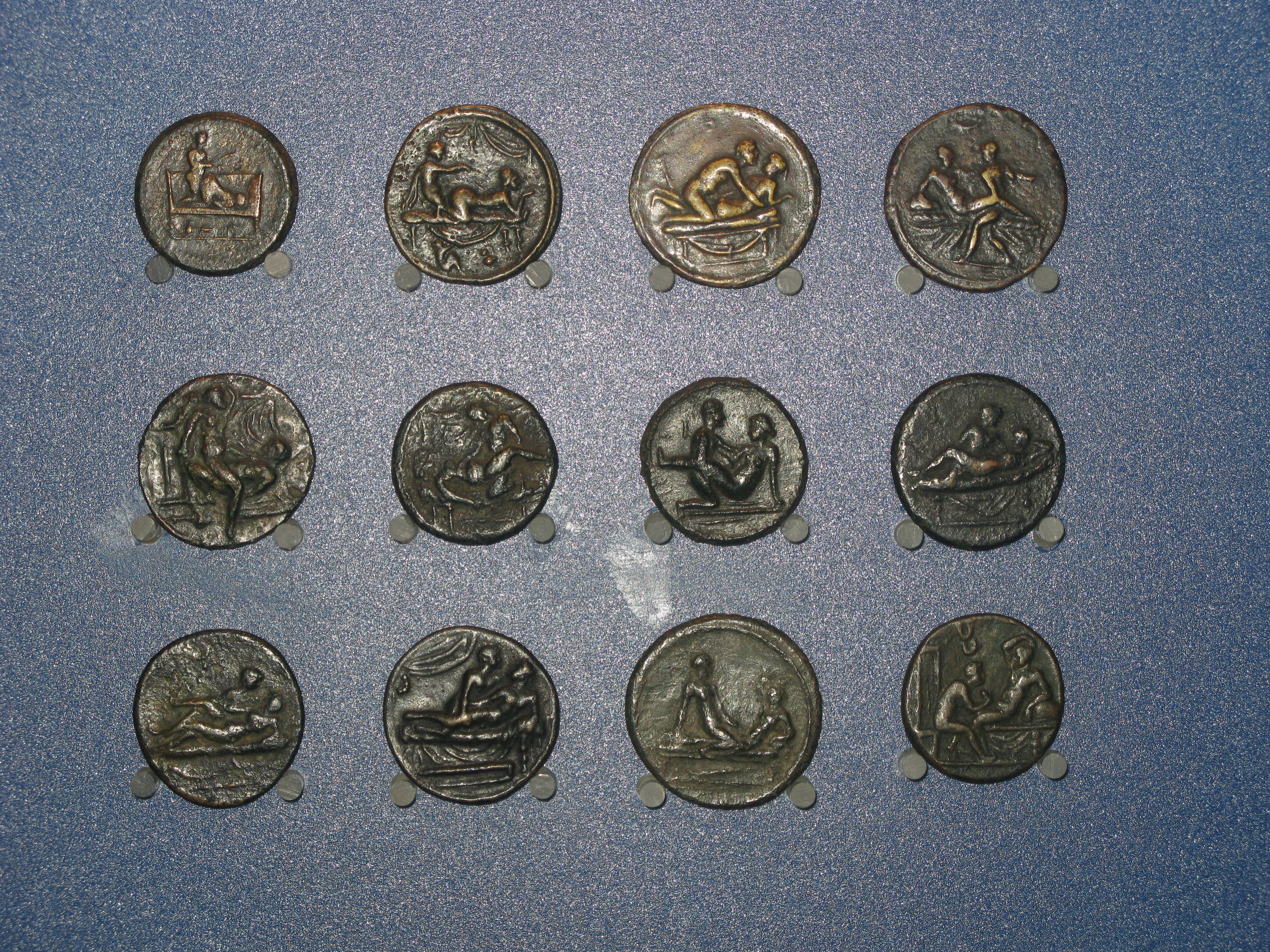
Bronze spintriae tokens (c. 22–37 CE) depicting a range of sex acts are archaeologically abundant, but it is unclear what they were used for (Hunterian Museum and Art Gallery)

Around 90 positions for intercourse are recorded in the ancient world. Both Roman erotic art and Latin literature, most famously a passage from Ovid's Art of Love, depict various forms of copulation (concubitus varii) and sexual positions (figurae veneris). The Latin terms are Ovid's, from his description of how the most aristocratic households displayed erotic paintings among their art collections. Sexual variety fascinated Romans. Astrology was thought to influence one's preferences and pursuits: people born when the sun, moon, and planets were in certain astrological signs (Note: Capricorn, Aquarius, Taurus or Cancer.) were supposed to be inclined toward secret vice or "unnatural" forms of intercourse, or to becoming pathici.

According to Suetonius, Tiberius had a vast collection of sex manuals and erotic art, including a painting of the mythological huntress Atalanta performing oral sex on Meleager, a work that the emperor regarded as worth more than a million sesterces.

Lucretius observes that sex acts may have different purposes. Prostitutes employ certain movements to give their customers pleasure and avoid pregnancy. Wives wishing to conceive are advised against moving vigorously during intercourse, since such movements "knock the ploughshare from the furrow and misdirect the sowing of the seed". Lucretius recommends "doggy style" (a tergo) for couples trying to conceive, because it mimics the natural procreative sex of animals.

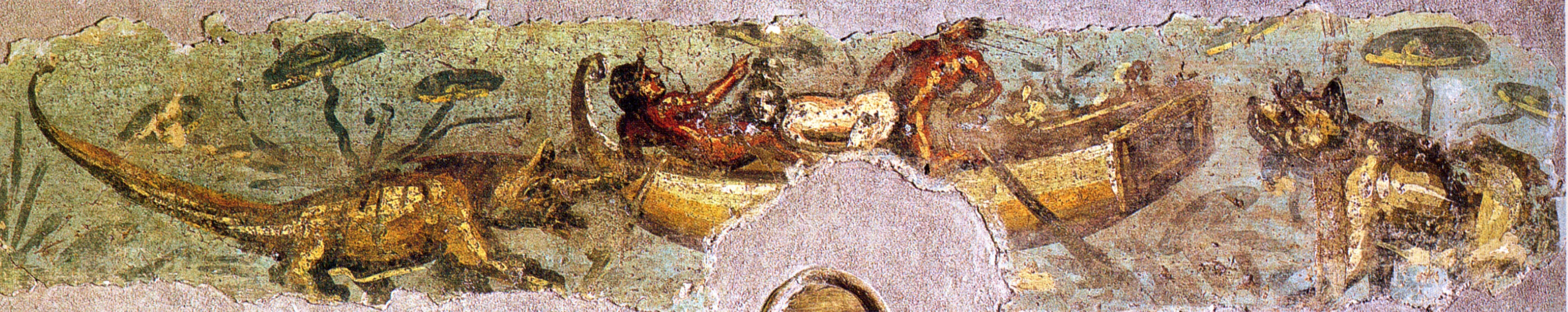
Erotic scene with a female and two males in a boat, surrounded by beasts; sex scenes set on the Nile consistently feature the doggy style position, often combined as here with fellatio

=== Sex ===
The basic obscene verb for a man having sex with a woman is futuo, "I fuck." Although not found in polite literature, futuo was not necessarily insulting or aggressive; it was used transactionally for sex between a prostitute and her client. In a passionate or loving setting, it may have been spoken as an arousing intimacy. A fragment from a play by Plautus suggests that acquiring an erotic vocabulary was part of a woman's introduction to sexuality within marriage: a virgin explains that she has not yet learned the words suitable for the wedding night (nupta verba). A woman's easy use of the word in other settings indicates her independence of social norms. "Either fuck me or let's fight it out," the formidable Fulvia is quoted as challenging the future Augustus. In graffiti at Pompeii written by both men and women, forms of futuo are used to announce prowess, satisfaction, or availability.

Thomas Habinek has claimed that "Ovid invents the category of the heterosexual male", since, he says, it was considered normal for a Roman man to have same-sex relations. Ovid radically rejects the Roman tradition of pederasty, and says he takes more pleasure (voluptas) in making love with a woman as his equal. Sexual pleasure between man and woman, he emphasizes, should be mutual; Ovid instructs his male pupils to make love to a woman slowly, as he advises men not to conclude the sex act without enabling their female partners to achieve orgasm. In one passage, he seems to be recommending simultaneous orgasm:

But don't you fail your lady, hoisting bigger sails, and don't let her get ahead of you on the track either; race to the finish together: that's when pleasure is full, when man and woman lie there, equally vanquished.

==== Mulier equitans ====
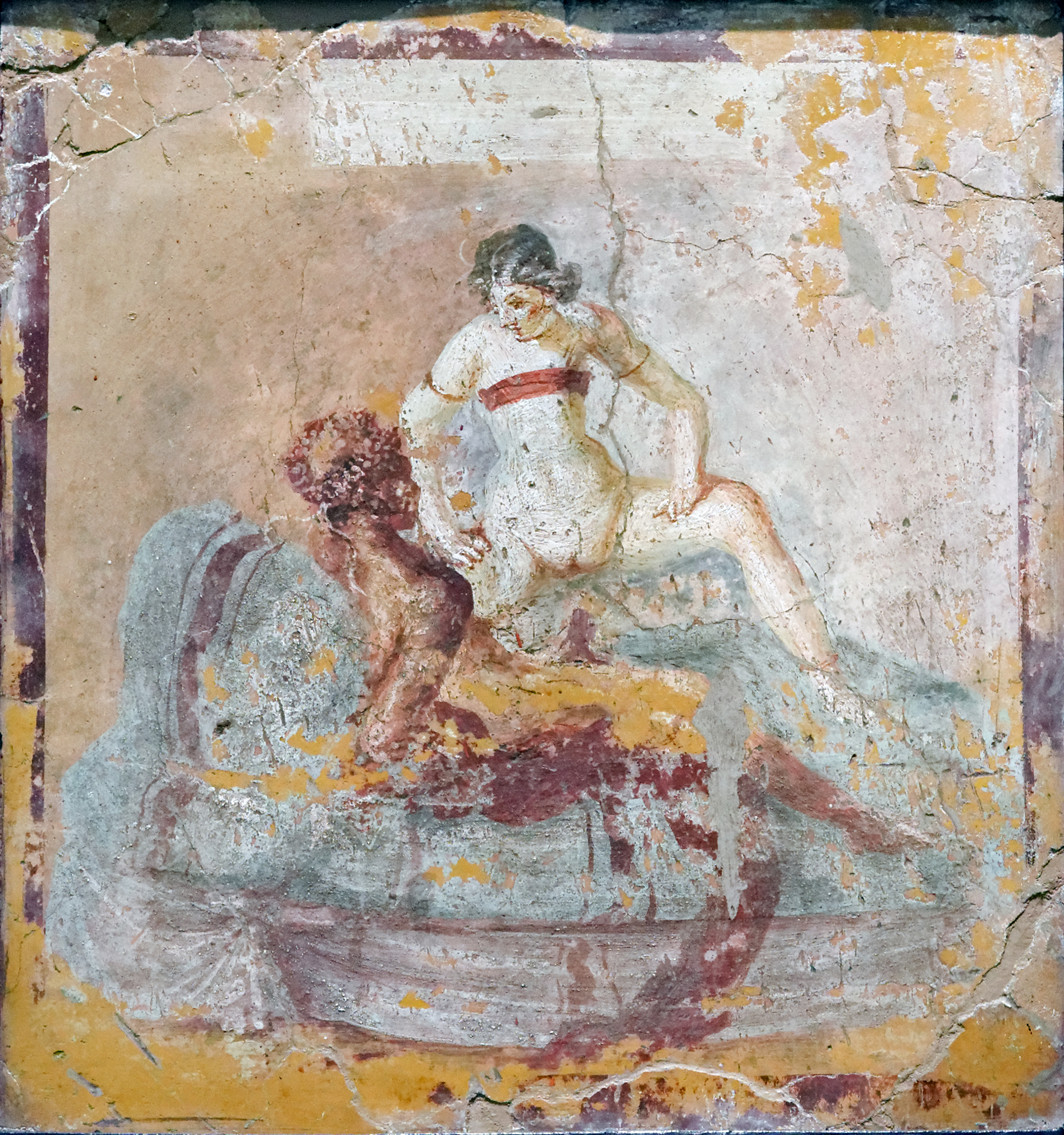
The "woman riding" position was a favorite in Roman art; here, the breasts remain covered, but the "mound of venus" is depilated

"Riding" is a common metaphor for the sex act, particularly used of the woman-on-top position. The mulier equitans ("woman riding") does not appear in Greek vase painting but is popular in Roman art. Ovid recommends it for the petite woman, as a tall woman may not wish to seem too towering in relation to the man. Supposedly favored by the mythological couple Hector and Andromache, even though she was of legendary height, it was jokingly called "the Hector horse". One relief from Roman Gaul showing the mulier equitans plays on the metaphor by picturing a galloping horse within a frame in the background.

In art, the mulier equitans convention has the woman posed frontally to expose her body in full to the viewer, often emphasizing her depilated pubic area. The significance of this position in Roman culture has been interpreted variously. Kenneth Dover thought it might represent the relative sexual emancipation of Roman women. From a woman's perspective, the position would grant independence of movement for her own pleasure. Paul Veyne, however, thought it emphasized that the woman had to do the work of servicing the man, who lies there and receives pleasure without effort. The position may have been favored for art because it pleased both male and female viewers: for men, it offered an unobstructed view of the woman's body, as recommended by Ovid, and of the penis entering the vagina; women saw the visually dominant female figure playing the active role.

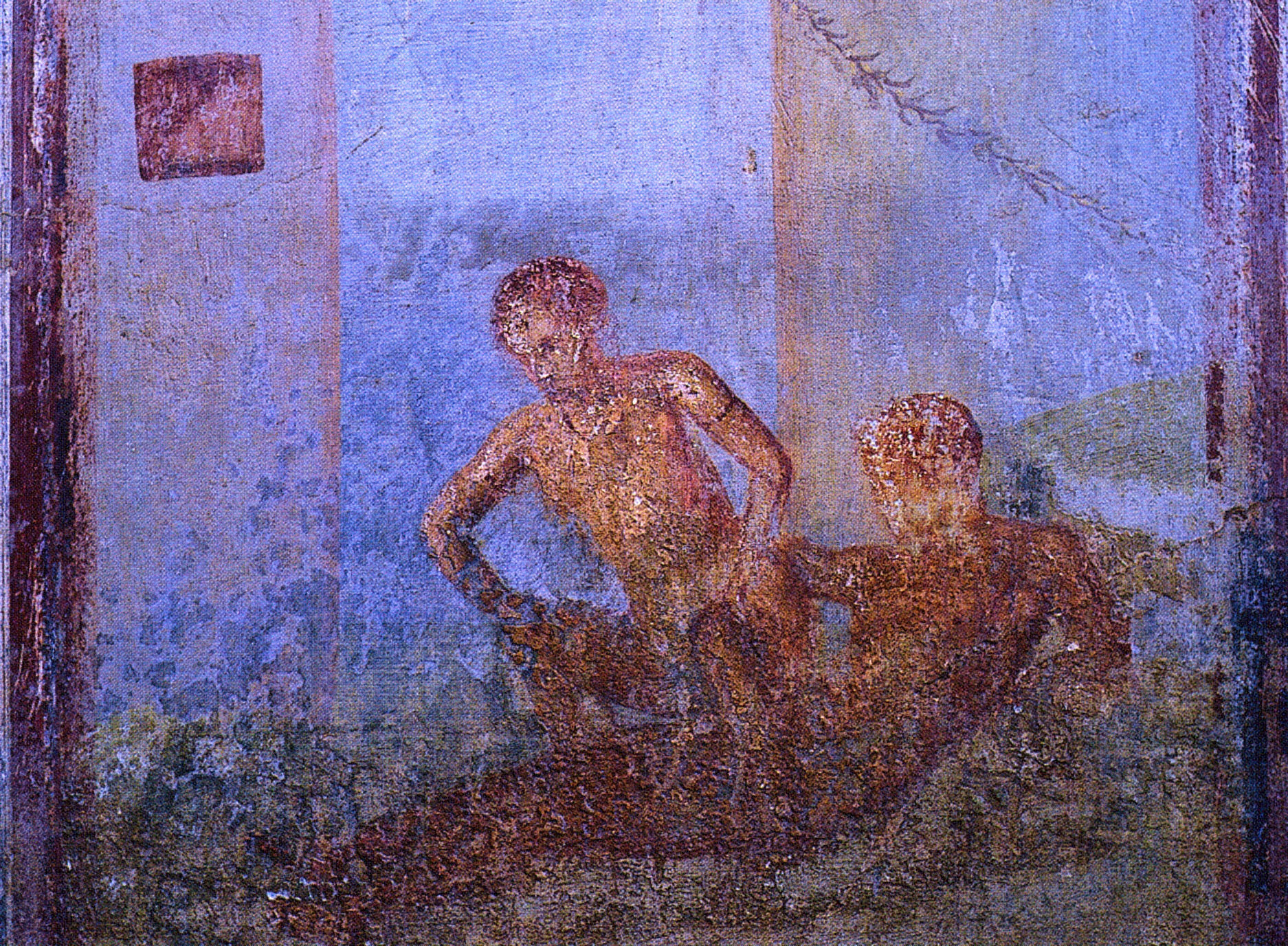
The Venus pendula aversa position in a wall painting from Pompeii

The position is also called Venus pendula conversa, "perpendicular Venus with the woman facing toward (the man)"; for its reverse (Venus pendula aversa, "perpendicular Venus with the woman facing away"), the man lies down with the woman on top, but she turns her back and faces his feet. This version is rarely mentioned or depicted, but is found in Roman art set in Nilotic Egypt.

An equestrian metaphor is also found for the cinaedus "riding" on top in anal sex, and at least once of lesbians who "take turns riding and move with the Moon as witness".

=== Anal sex ===
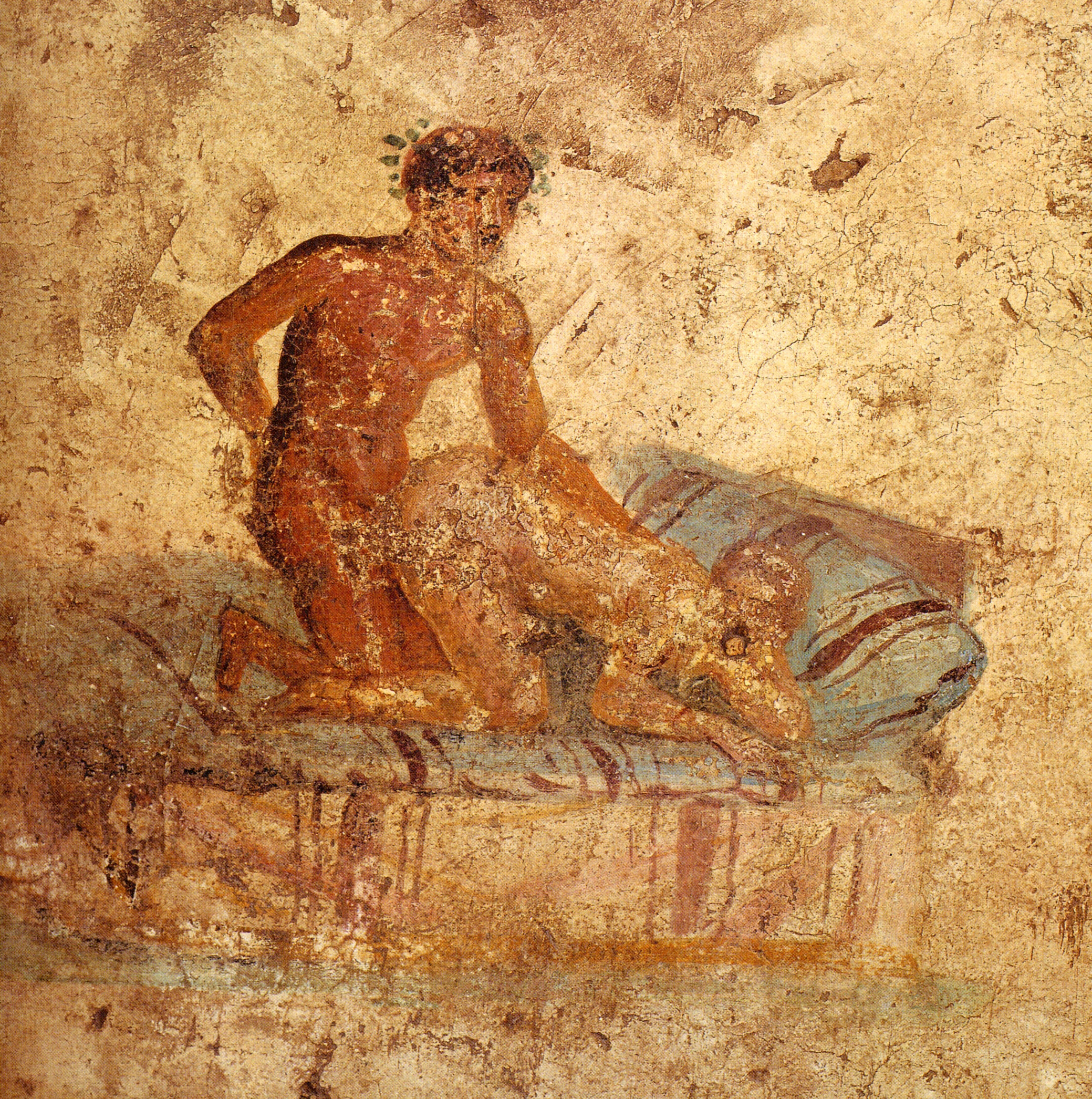
"The lioness" position (Casa del Ristorante, Pompeii)

The Latin verb for "to penetrate anally, bugger" is pedicare. The object was usually but not always male. Pedicare was a blunt and non-euphemistic word, and can be used in a threatening manner, as notoriously by Catullus in Carmen 16, or in general to mean "fuck you". The etymology of pedicare is unclear, but some have thought it derived from Greek paidika, having to do with pederasty. The basic word for "anus" was culus. Common metaphors are ficus, "fig", and anus, "ring," which was considered a decorous term and was standard in medical texts.

Men were said to "take it like a woman" (muliebria pati, "to undergo womanly things") when they were anally penetrated, but when a man performed anal sex on a woman, she was thought of as playing the boy's role. Martial, for instance, is emphatic that anal sex is better with boys than with women; when his wife objects that she provides him with anal sex in an effort to preserve his fidelity, he taunts her with the inferiority of her anus compared with a boy's.

The figura veneris in which the woman crouches to lift her buttocks, called "the lioness", may be intended for anal penetration, since boys in Greek art can be portrayed in the same position; with a female partner, it may be difficult to distinguish in art from a tergo (rear entry). Culibonia ("good anal") was a humorous term for a prostitute with this speciality. Avoiding pregnancy may have been one motive for female prostitutes to offer anal intercourse.

=== Os impurum ===
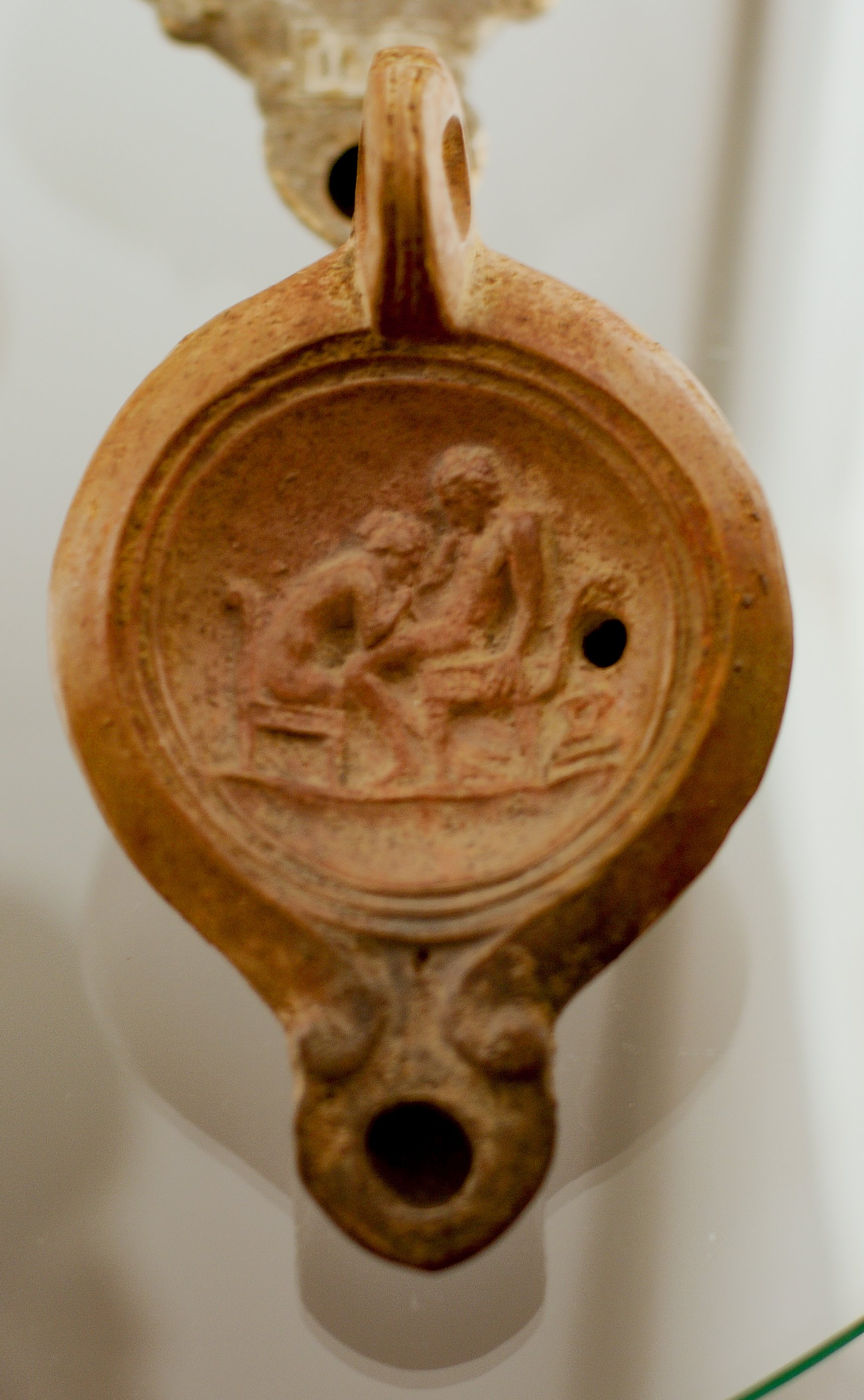
Fellatio on an oil lamp

Os impurum, "filthy mouth" or "impure mouth", was a term of abuse especially for those who provided oral sex. "Oral turpitude" was a favorite form of invective for Catullus, Horace, and Martial. An accusation of having an os impurum is an "extreme obscenity", so vile that Cicero reserved it for men of lower standing than himself, only implying that their debasement tainted their more powerful patrons who were his real targets.

It was a convention of obscenely comic verse that oral sex caused bad breath that was nearly toxic. "Whores of the alleyways" are contaminated from giving oral sex; Catullus refers to "the foul saliva of a pissed-over whore". The urinary function of the penis makes oral sex particularly repulsive to Catullus, who elsewhere reviles a Celtiberian for brushing his teeth in urine. Martial jokes that a fine perfume turned to garum, fish sauce, when it was sniffed by a man whose breath was putrid from oral sex. In another of Martial's epigrams, a fellator breathes on a hot cake to cool it down and turns it to excrement. The bad breath and rotten teeth that are attributed to performing oral sex represent moral decay and a general corruption of the mouth's positive functions as the organ of a citizen's persuasive speech.

==== Cunnilingus and fellatio ====
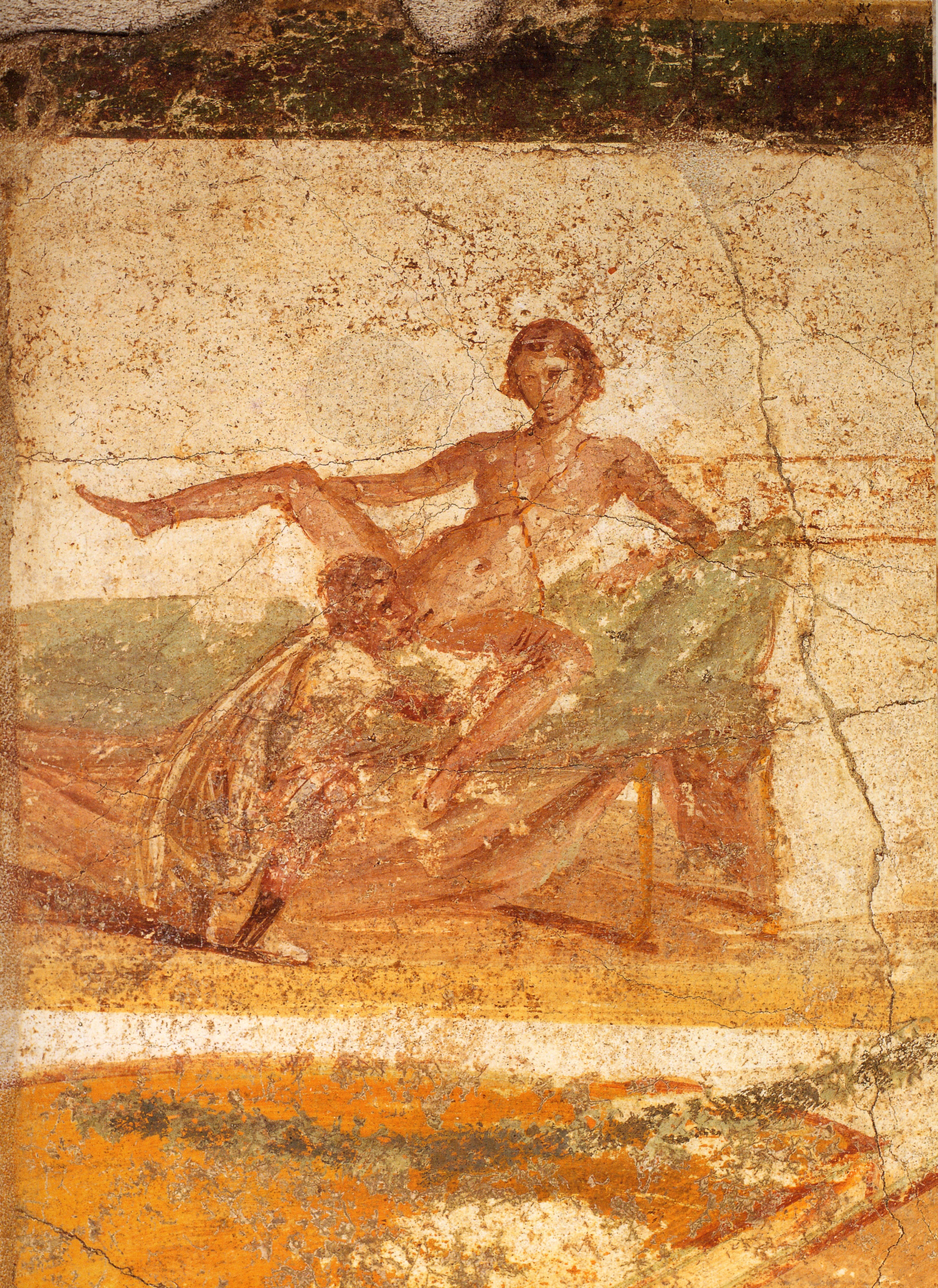
Wall painting from Pompeii depicting cunnilingus

Because of the stigma attached to providing physical pleasure, a man who performed oral sex on a woman was subject to mockery. Cunnilingus typically appears in Roman art only as part of a reciprocal act, with the woman fellating her male partner in some variation of the "69" position. However, a wall painting from Pompeii (shown here) represents a virtually unique role reversal in giving oral sex. The woman who receives cunnilingus is tall and shapely, well-groomed, and brazenly nude except for jewelry. The male figure is relatively small, crouching subserviently, and fully clothed; he looks anxious or furtive. The situation is so extreme that it was probably meant to be humorous as well as titillating; other paintings in this group show a series of sex acts, at least some of which could be seen as transgressive or parodic.

There is some evidence that women could hire male prostitutes to provide cunnilingus. Graffiti at Pompeii advertise the prices male prostitutes charged for cunnilingus, in the same price range as females performing fellatio; however, the graffiti could be intended as insults to the men named, and not as actual advertisements. One graffito is perhaps intended as political invective: "Vote Isidore for aedile; he's the best at licking cunt!"

The Latin verb fellare is usually used for a woman performing oral sex on a man. Accusing a man of fellating another man was possibly the worst insult in all Roman invective. It was an act that might be requested from women who were infames, and not something a husband in a respectable household would have expected from his wife. Fellatio was seen as a "somewhat laughable" preference for older men who have trouble maintaining an erection, but graffiti show that the skills of a good fellatrix were enthusiastically utilized. Fellatio was a fairly uncommon subject in Roman art.

==== Irrumatio ====
Irrumatio is a forced form of fellatio. Forcing someone to be a receptacle for oral sex was proof of virility, something to boast about, as indicated by the Priapeia and the poems of Catullus and Martial. It was also threatened as a punishment, particularly for adulterers. Martial urges a wronged husband who has already cut off the adulterous man's ears and nose to complete the humiliation by befouling his mouth with oral rape.

=== Group sex ===
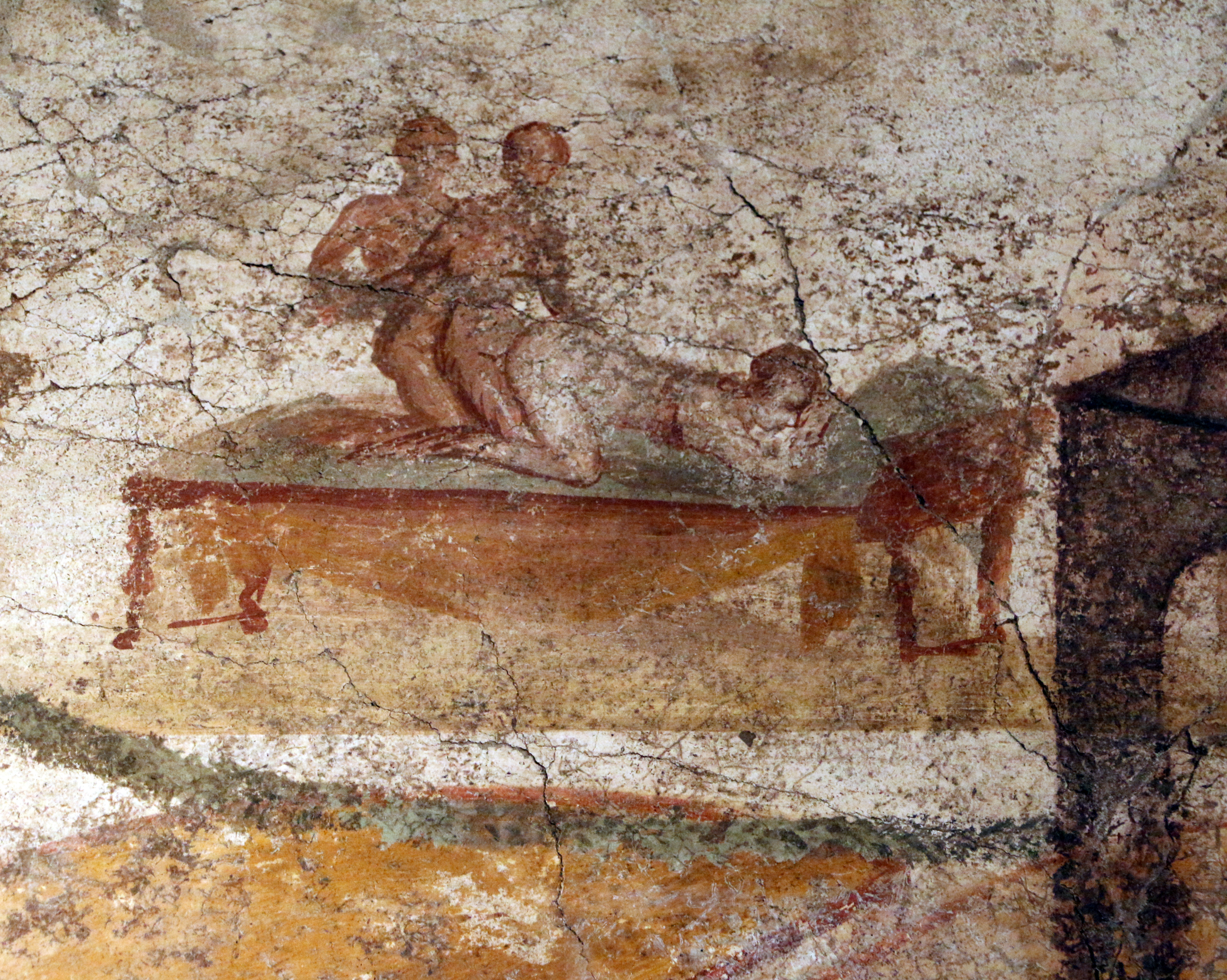
Threesome (from Pompeii) arranged in the manner described by Catullus, poem 56

Group sex appears in literary sources, graffiti, and art. Suetonius says that the emperor Tiberius enjoyed watching group sex, and described "chains" arranged of girls and boys:

In his retreat at Capri, he put together a bedroom that was the theater of his secret debauches. There he assembled from all over companies of male and female prostitutes, and inventors of monstrous couplings (which he called spintriae), so that, intertwining themselves and forming a triple chain (triplici serie connexi), they mutually prostituted themselves in front of him to fire up his flagging desires.

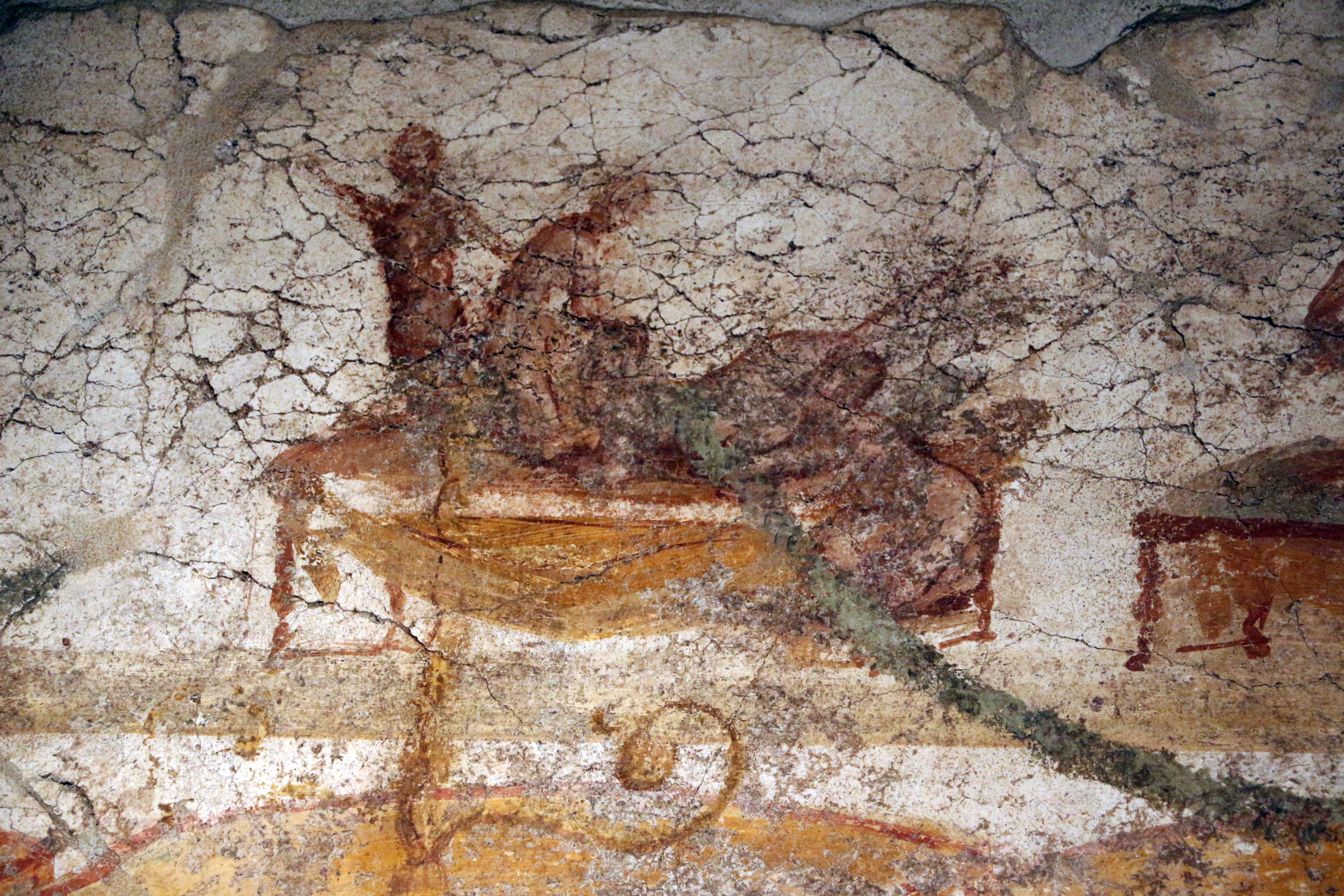
Foursome from the Suburban Baths at Pompeii

Most threesomes depict two men penetrating a woman. A medallion from Roman Gaul shows two men reclining on a bed, one on the right and one on the left, with their legs extended under a woman between them. Another shows a woman "riding" a man who reclines, while a man standing behind her parts her legs to enter. A far less common variation has one man entering a woman from the rear while he in turn receives anal sex from a man standing behind him, a scenario found in Catullus, Carmen 56 as well as art. Catullus makes it clear that this concatenation was considered humorous, possibly because the man in the center could be a cinaedus, a male who liked to receive anal sex but who was also considered seductive to women.

Foursomes also appear in Roman art, typically with two women and two men, sometimes in same-sex pairings. One example of a foursome from the Suburban Baths at Pompeii demonstrates what Romans saw as the superior role. A woman on the far right kneels beside a bed to perform cunnilingus on a woman lying on it; this woman in turn fellates a man who kneels above her. The man is himself receiving anal sex from a fourth figure, who is represented as the "victor": he acts only to fulfill his own sexual gratification without providing it to others, and looks directly at the viewer with a triumphant wave of the hand.

A Latin epigram by the Gallo-Roman poet Ausonius (4th century AD) is a riddle that depends on familiarity with the configurations of group sex:

"Three men in bed together: two are committing debauchery (stuprum), two are being debauched."
"Doesn't that make four men?"
"You're mistaken: the man on either end each counts as a single offense, but the one in the middle both acts and is acted on."

=== Masturbation ===
Masturbation is little noted in the sources for Roman sexuality. The Romans evidently preferred the left hand for masturbation. Martial has a few mentions in his poems, but considers it an inferior form of sexual release resorted to by slaves, though he admits to masturbating when a beautiful slave-boy is too expensive to obtain: "my hand relieved me as a substitute for Ganymede". It was a longstanding if infrequent theme in Latin satire; one of the few surviving fragments of Lucilius, Rome's earliest satirist, jokes about a personified penis (Mutto) whose girlfriend Laeva ("Lefty") wipes away his "tears". A graffito from Pompeii reads "when my worries oppress my body, with my left hand I release my pent-up fluids".

The etymology of the Latin verb masturbari is unclear. It has been argued that it is a compound of turbare 'agitate' and mas 'male', in an otherwise unattested usage for 'penis'. One traditional view sees man(u)- 'hand' with an altered form of stuprare 'to defile, commit a sexual wrong against'. Calvert Watkins proposed that it derives from a Proto-Indo-European root meaning 'marrow, brain', since ancient medical writers believed that semen descended from the brain through the bones; if this is correct, the word turbare may still have influenced the formation in Latin.

=== Bestiality ===
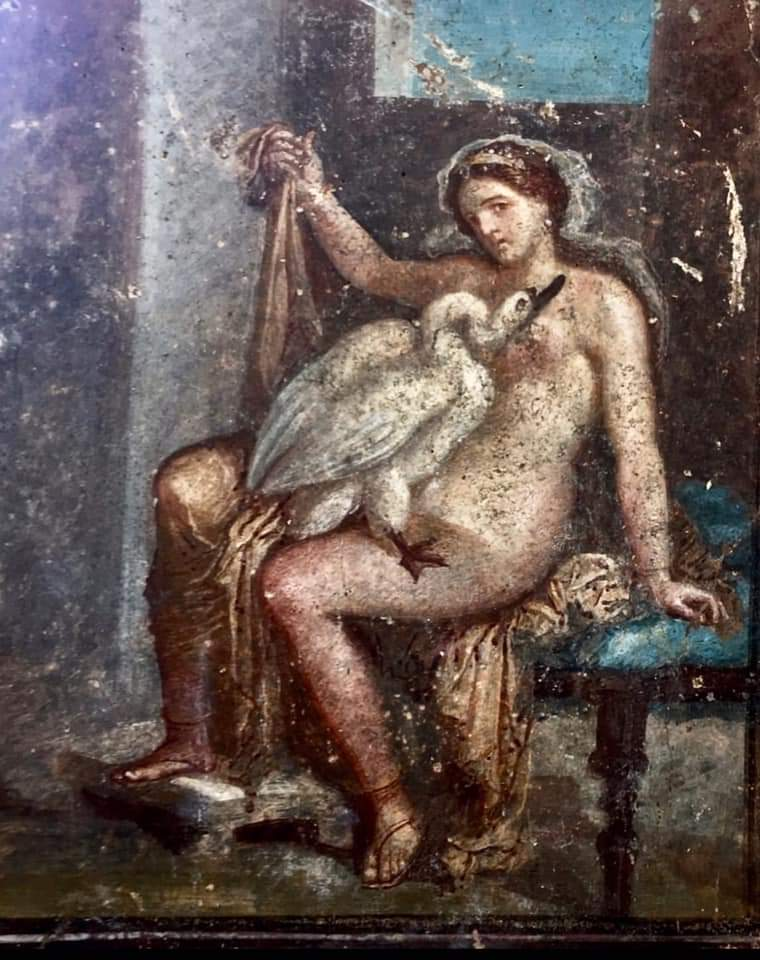
Fresco from Pompeii showing Leda and the swan

The mythological tradition is full of sexual encounters between humans and other animals, especially mortal women and gods in the guise of animals. Bestiality is a particular characteristic of intercourse with Jupiter (Greek Zeus), who visits Leda as a swan and Europa as a bull. The Minotaur is born when Pasiphaë feels such sexual attraction for a bull that she has herself disguised as a cow to mate with him. Satyrs, known for their sexual voracity, are often pictured with bestial features.

Mock bestiality is recorded as a form of sexual roleplay in Imperial Rome. The actor Bathyllus was known for an erotic dance in which he dressed as Leda having sex with the swan; the women watching were variously aroused. Bestiality is also a theme of Apuleius' novel Metamorphoses (or The Golden Ass), in which the protagonist, transformed into a donkey, is desired by a wealthy noble matron, just as Pasiphaë desired the bull.

Nero is supposed to have enjoyed a form of bondage with either male or female partners in which he dressed in animal skins to attack their genitals, just as condemned prisoners were bound and attacked by wild animals in the arena. The historian Dio tells of how a prostitute pretended to be a leopard for the gratification of a senator.

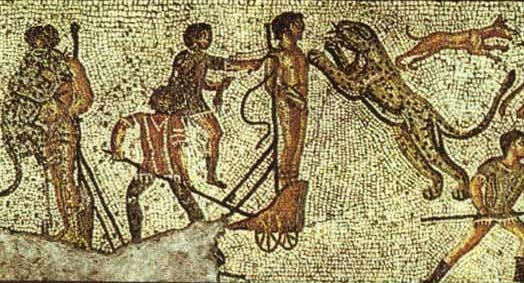
Leopard attacking a condemned person in the arena (Zliten mosaic, c. 200 AD)

There is some indication that violent sexual encounters, like other mythological scenarios, were acted out as punitive entertainment in the arena. The poet Martial praises a scenario for its fidelity to the Pasiphaë myth. The logistics of staging a sex act between a woman and a bull is a matter of speculation; if "Pasiphaë" were a condemned criminal to be tortured and killed, the animal may have been induced by the application of "vaginal secretion from a cow in season". In Apuleius' novel, a female poisoner condemned ad bestias is scheduled to appear in the arena for intercourse with the protagonist in his bestial form.

== Hermaphroditism and androgyny ==
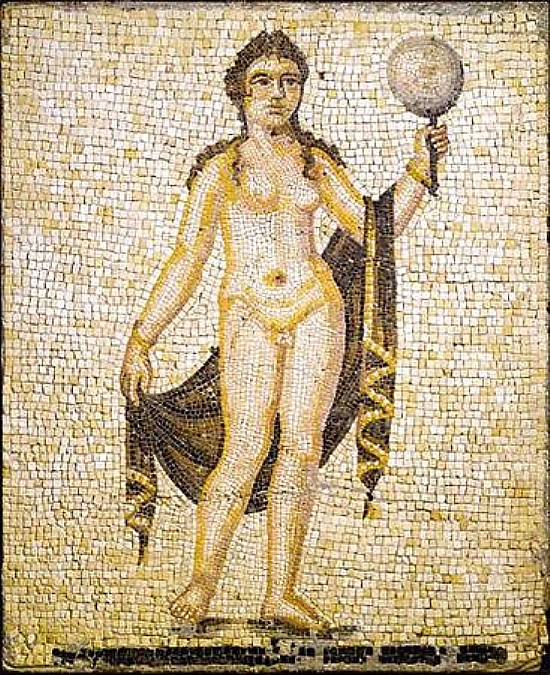
Hermaphroditus on a mosaic from Roman North Africa, 2nd-3rd century CE

In the mythological tradition, Hermaphroditus was a beautiful youth who was the son of Hermes (Roman Mercury) and Aphrodite (Venus). Like many other divinities and heroes, he had been nursed by nymphs, but the evidence that he himself received cult devotion among the Greeks is sparse. Ovid wrote the most influential narrative of how Hermaphroditus became androgynous, emphasizing that although the handsome youth was on the cusp of sexual adulthood, he rejected love as Narcissus had and likewise at the site of a reflective pool. There the water nymph Salmacis saw and desired him. He spurned her, and she pretended to withdraw until, thinking himself alone, he undressed to bathe in her waters. She then flung herself upon him, and prayed that they might never be parted. The gods granted this request, and thereafter the body of Hermaphroditus contained both male and female. As a result, men who drank from the waters of the spring Salmacis supposedly "grew soft with the vice of impudicitia", according to the lexicographer Festus. The myth of Hylas, the young companion of Hercules who was abducted by water nymphs, shares with Hermaphroditus and Narcissus the theme of the dangers that face the beautiful adolescent male as he transitions to adult masculinity, with varying outcomes for each.

In contemporary English, "hermaphrodite" has acquired pejorative connotations in referring to people born with physical characteristics of both sexes (see intersex); in antiquity, however, the figure of the so-called hermaphrodite was a primary focus of questions pertaining to gender identity. The hermaphrodite represented a "violation of social boundaries, especially those as fundamental to daily life as male and female".

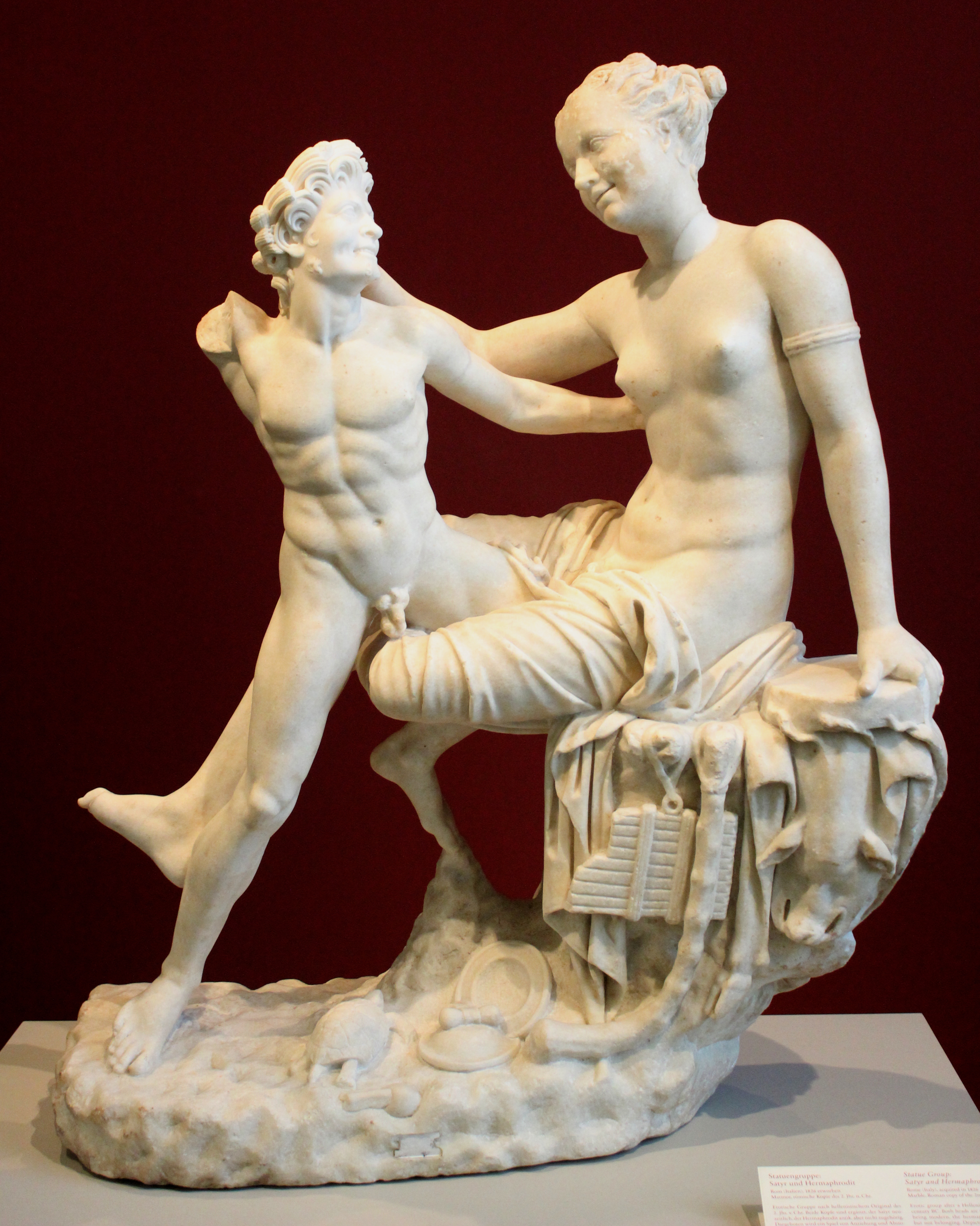
A satyr and Hermaphroditus, 2nd century CE (Altes Museum, Berlin)

Depictions of Hermaphroditus were very popular among the Romans. The dramatic situation in paintings often elicits a "double take" on the part of the viewer, or expresses the theme of sexual frustration. Hermaphroditus is often in the company of a satyr, a figure of bestial sexuality known for subjecting an unsuspecting or often sleeping victim to non-consensual sex; the satyr in scenes with Hermaphroditus is usually shown to be surprised or repulsed, to humorous effect. In a few works, Hermaphroditus is strong enough to ward off his would-be attacker, but in others he shows his willingness to engage in sex, even if the satyr seems no longer inclined:

Artistic representations of Hermaphroditus bring to the fore the ambiguities in sexual differences between women and men as well as the ambiguities in all sexual acts. ... Hermaphroditus gives an eternally ambiguous answer to a man's curiosity about a woman's sexual experience—and vice versa. ... (A)rtists always treat Hermaphroditus in terms of the viewer finding out his/her actual sexual identity. ... Hermaphroditus stands for both the physical and, more important, the psychological impossibility of ever understanding the feelings of the beloved. Hermaphroditus is a highly sophisticated representation, invading the boundaries between the sexes that seem so clear in classical thought and representation.

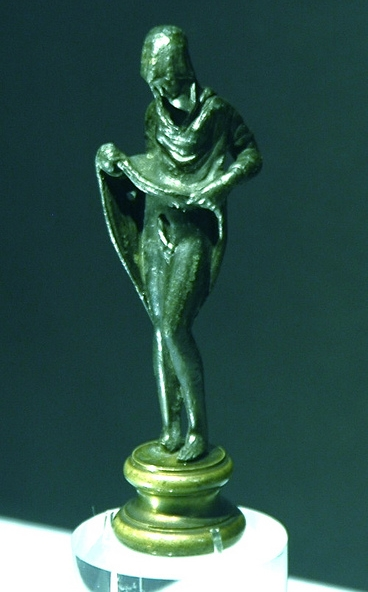
Roman imperial bronze figurine of Aphroditus, 1st–3rd century CE

Macrobius describes a masculine form of "Venus" (Aphrodite) who received cult on Cyprus; she had a beard and male genitals, but wore women's clothing. The deity's worshippers cross-dressed, men wearing women's clothes, and women men's. The Latin poet Laevius wrote of worshipping "nurturing Venus" whether female or male (sive femina sive mas). The figure was sometimes called Aphroditos. In several surviving examples of Greek and Roman sculpture, she is found in the attitude anasyrmene, from the Greek verb anasyromai, "to pull up one's clothes". The love goddess lifts her garments to reveal her masculine attribute, male genitalia, a gesture that traditionally held apotropaic or magical power.

In his chapter on anthropology and human physiology in the encyclopedic Natural History, Pliny notes that "there are even those who are born of both sexes, whom we call hermaphrodites, at one time androgyni" (andr-, "man", and gyn-, "woman", from the Greek). The Sicilian historian Diodorus (1st century BC) wrote that "there are some who declare that the coming into being of creatures of a kind such as these are marvels (terata), and being born rarely, they announce the future, sometimes for evil and sometimes for good". Isidore of Seville (c. 560–636) described a hermaphrodite fancifully as those who "have the right breast of a man and the left of a woman, and after coitus in turn can both sire and bear children".

In traditional Roman religion, a hermaphroditic birth was a kind of prodigium, an occurrence that signalled a disturbance of the pax deorum, Rome's treaty with the gods, as Diodorus indicated. Livy records an incident during the Second Punic War when the discovery of a four-year-old hermaphrodite prompted an elaborate series of expiations: on the advice of the haruspices, the child was enclosed in a chest, carried out to sea, and allowed to drown. Other rituals followed. A hermaphrodite found in 133 BC was drowned in the local river; executing the hermaphroditic person by drowning seems to have been the prescribed way to repair the perceived violation of the natural order.

Pliny observed that while hermaphrodites were once considered portents (prodigia), in his day they had become objects of delight (deliciae); they were among the human curiosities of the sort that the wealthy might acquire at the "monsters' market" at Rome described by Plutarch. Under Roman law, a hermaphrodite had to be classed as either male or female; no third gender existed as a legal category.

== Sexual conquest and imperialism ==
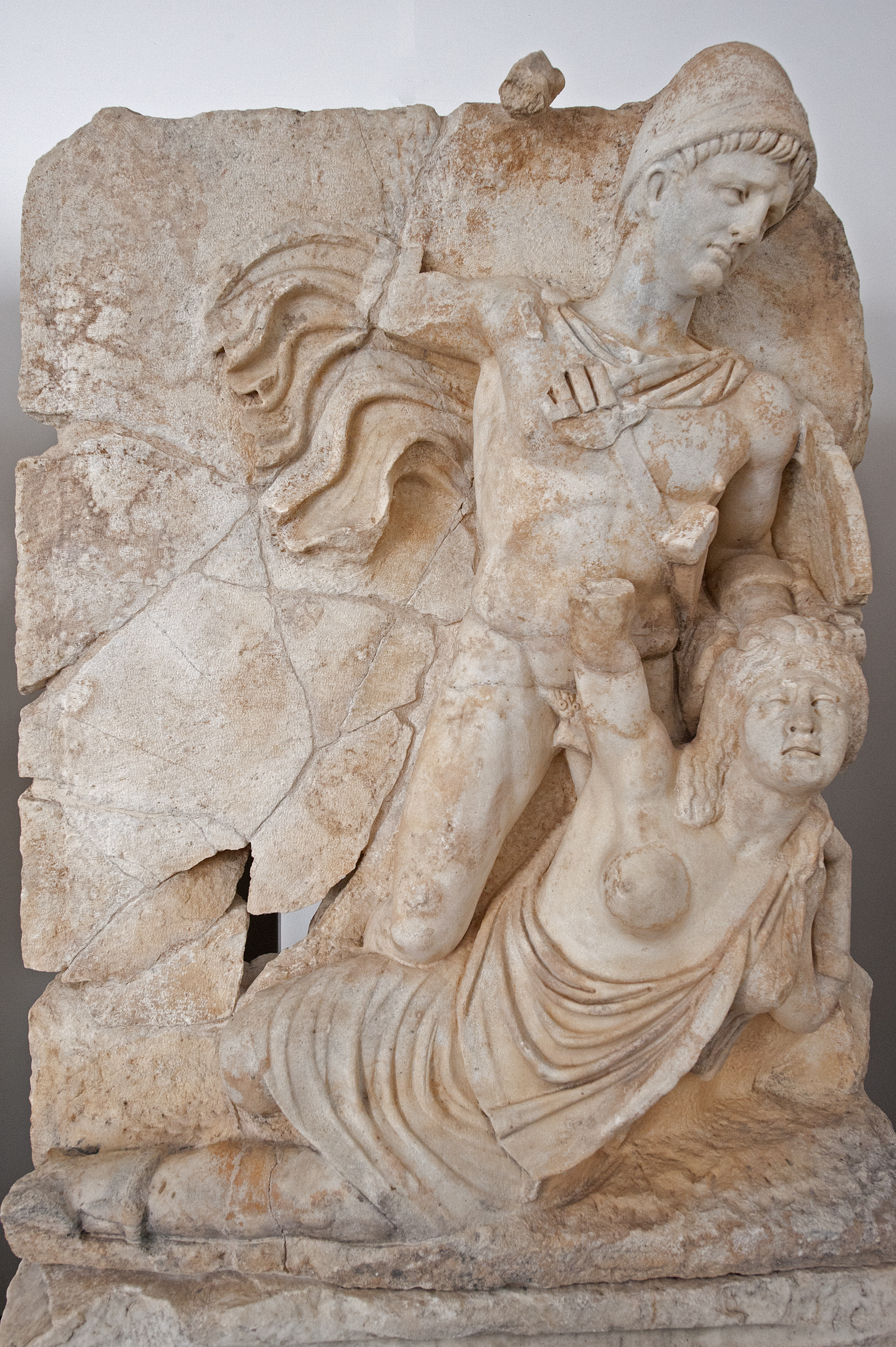
The emperor Claudius, heroically nude, overpowering the female personification of Britannia, from Aphrodisias in present-day Turkey

In 55 BC, Pompeius Magnus ("Pompey the Great") opened his theater complex dedicated to Venus Victrix, "Venus the Conqueror". The Theater of Pompey was in many ways the permanent monument of his military triumph six years earlier. Among the displays were portrait galleries of female writers and of courtesans; a series of images illustrated freakish births that had served as war omens. In general, intellectuality and culture are represented as feminine and Hellenized, while war and politics are Roman and masculine. Statues personified fourteen conquered nationes ("nations, peoples") as women in ethnic or "barbarian" dress.

Other monuments throughout the Empire, including the Sebasteion at Aphrodisias and the altar of the Sanctuary of the Three Gauls at Lugdunum (modern Lyon, France), as well as various coins, embody conquered territories and peoples as women: Roman military power defeats a "feminized" nation. Although the figures from Pompey's theater have not survived, relief panels from Aphrodisias include scenes such as a heroically nude Claudius forcing the submission of Britannia, whose right breast is bare, and Nero dragging away a dead Armenia, a composition that recalls the defeat of the Amazon Penthesilea by Achilles. A particularly well-documented series of coins depicts Iudaea Capta, a female personification of the Jewish nation as captive, issued after the destruction of the Temple of Jerusalem in 70 AD.

Sexual conquest is a metaphor widely used by the Romans for imperialism, but not always straightforwardly for Roman domination. Horace famously described the Romans as taken captive by captive Greece: the image of Roman culture colonized from within by a civilization they had defeated but perceived as intellectually and aesthetically superior might be expressed by myths in which a man raped, abducted, or enslaved a woman but fell in love with her, as embodied for instance by Achilles and Briseis.

== See also ==
- Catamite
- Erotic art in Pompeii and Herculaneum
- Exoletus
- History of erotic depictions
- History of human sexuality
- Homosexuality in ancient Rome
- Homoeroticism
- Latin profanity

== Cited sources ==
- Adams, J.N. (1982). The Latin Sexual Vocabulary. Johns Hopkins University Press. ISBN 978-0-8018-4106-4.
- Brown, Robert D. (1987). Lucretius on Love and Sex. Brill.
- Cantarella, Eva (1992). Bisexuality in the Ancient World. Yale University Press. ISBN 978-0-300-04844-5.
- Clarke, John R. (April 2001). Looking at Lovemaking: Constructions of Sexuality in Roman Art 100 B.C.–A.D. 250. University of California Press. ISBN 9780520229044.
- Colish, Marcia l. (1985). The Stoic Tradition from Antiquity to the Early Middle Ages. BRILL. ISBN 90-04-07267-5.
- Dugan, John (2001). "Preventing Ciceronianism: C. Licinius Calvus' Regimens for Sexual and Oratorical Self-Mastery". Classical Philology. 96 (4): 400–428. doi:10.1086/449558. JSTOR 1215514.
- Edwards, Catharine (1993). The Politics of Immorality in Ancient Rome. Cambridge University Press.
- Fantham, Elaine (2011). "Stuprum: Public Attitudes and Penalties for Sexual Offences in Republican Rome". Roman Readings: Roman Response to Greek Literature from Plautus to Statius and Quintilian. Walter de Gruyter.
- Fredrick, David, ed. (3 October 2002). The Roman Gaze: Vision, Power, and the Body. JHU Press. ISBN 978-0-8018-6961-7.
- Gaca, Kathy L. (2003). The Making of Fornication: Eros, Ethics and Political Reform in Greek Philosophy and Early Christianity. University of California Press.
- Gardner, Jane F. (1991). Women in Roman Law and Society. Indiana University Press.
- Habinek, Thomas; Schiesaro, Alessandro (1997). The Roman Cultural Revolution. Cambridge University Press. ISBN 978-0-521-58092-2.
- Hallett, Judith P.; Skinner, Marilyn, eds. (1997). Roman Sexualities. Princeton University Press.
- Kuttner, Ann L. (1999). "Culture and History at Pompey's Museum". Transactions of the American Philological Association. 129: 343–373. doi:10.2307/284436. JSTOR 284436.
- Langlands, Rebecca (2006). Sexual Morality in Ancient Rome. Cambridge University Press.
- McGinn, Thomas A.J. (1998). Prostitution, Sexuality and the Law in Ancient Rome. Oxford University Press.
- McGinn, Thomas A. (2004). The Economy of Prostitution in the Roman World. University of Michigan Press.
- The Economy of Prostitution in the Roman World. University of Michigan Press. 2004.
- Nussbaum, Martha C. (2002). "The Incomplete Feminism of Musonius Rufus, Platonist, Stoic, and Roman". The Sleep of Reason: Erotic Experience and Sexual Ethics in Ancient Greece and Rome. University of Chicago Press.
- Parker, H. (2007). Free Women and Male Slaves, or Mandingo meets the Roman Empire. Presses universitaires de Franche-Comté. ISBN 2848671696.
- Penner, Todd C. Penner; Stichele, Caroline Van der, eds. (2007). Mapping Gender in Ancient Religious Discourses. BRILL. ISBN 90-04-15447-7.
- Phang, Sara Elise (2001). The Marriage of Roman Soldiers (13 B.C.–A.D. 235): Law and Family in the Imperial Army. Brill.
- Phang (2008). Roman Military Service: Ideologies of Discipline in the Late Republic and Early Principate. Cambridge University Press.
- Potter, David S., ed. (2009). A Companion to the Roman Empire. John Wiley & Sons. ISBN 978-1-4051-9918-6.
- Richlin, Amy (1983). The Garden of Priapus: Sexuality and Aggression in Roman Humor. Oxford University Press.
- Richlin, Amy (1993). "Not before Homosexuality: The Materiality of the cinaedus and the Roman Law against Love between Men". Journal of the History of Sexuality. 3 (4): 523–573. JSTOR 3704392.
- Schäfer, Peter (1997). Judeophobia: Attitudes Toward the Jews in the Ancient World. Harvard University Press. ISBN 978-0-674-48778-9.
- Peter Schäfer (2003). The History of the Jews in the Greco-Roman World: The Jews of Palestine from Alexander the Great to the Arab Conquest. Routledge. ISBN 1-134-40316-X.
- Smallwood, E. Mary (1976). The Jews Under Roman Rule: From Pompey to Diocletian. Brill Archive. ISBN 90-04-04491-4.
- Staples, Ariadne (1998). From Good Goddess to Vestal Virgins: Sex and Category in Roman Religion. Psychology Press. ISBN 978-0-415-13233-6.
- Taylor, Rabun M. (2008). The Moral Mirror of Roman Art. Cambridge University Press. ISBN 978-0-521-86612-5.
- Williams, Craig A. (1999). Roman Homosexuality: Ideologies of Masculinity in Classical Antiquity. Oxford University Press.
- Younger, John G. (2005). Sex in the Ancient World from A to Z. Routledge.
