= Lex Scantinia =

Ancient Roman law

The Lex Scantinia (less often Scatinia) is a poorly documented Roman law that penalized stuprum (criminalized sexual behavior or "sex crime") against a freeborn male minor (ingenuus or praetextatus). The primary use of the Lex Scantinia seems to have been harassing political opponents whose lifestyles opened them to criticism as being passive homosexuals or pederasts in the Hellenistic manner.

The law may have made stuprum against a minor a capital crime, but this is unclear: a large fine may have been imposed instead, as executions of Roman citizens were rarely imposed by a court of law during the Republic. The conflation of the Lex Scantinia with later or other restrictions on sexual behaviors has sometimes led to erroneous assertions that the Romans had strict laws and penalties against homosexuality in general.

== Background ==
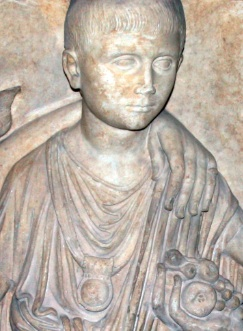
Roman boy wearing a bulla, which marked him as sexually off-limits

Latin has no words that are straightforwardly equivalent to "homosexual" and "heterosexual." The main dichotomy within Roman sexuality was active/dominant/masculine and passive/submissive/"feminized." The adult male citizen was defined by his libertas, "liberty," and allowing his body to be used for pleasure by others was considered servile or submissive and a threat to his integrity. A Roman's masculinity was not compromised by his having sex with males of lower status, such as male prostitutes or slaves, as long as he took the active, penetrating role. Same-sex relations among Roman men thus differed from the Greek ideal of homosexuality among freeborn men of equal social status, but usually with some difference in age (see "Homosexuality in ancient Greece" and "Pederasty in ancient Greece"). The adult Roman male who enjoyed receiving anal sex or performing oral sex was thought to lack virtus, the quality that distinguished a man (vir).

The protective amulet (bulla) worn by freeborn Roman boys was a visible sign that they were sexually off-limits. Puberty was considered a dangerous transitional stage in the formation of masculine identity. When a boy came of age, he removed his bulla, dedicated it to the household gods, and became sexually active under the patronage of Liber, the god of both political and sexual liberty. Pederasty among the Romans involved an adult male citizen and a youth who was typically a slave between the ages of 12 and 20 (catamite or amasius).

== The law ==
As John Boswell has noted, "if there was a law against homosexual relations, no one in Cicero's day knew anything about it." Although the Lex Scantinia is mentioned in several ancient sources, its provisions are unclear. It penalized the debauchery (stuprum) of a youth, but may also have permitted the prosecution of citizens who chose to take the pathic ("passive" or "submissive") role in homosexual relations. Suetonius mentions the law in the context of punishments for those who are "unchaste," which might imply, among other things, pathic behavior among male citizens; Ausonius has an epigram in which a semivir, "half-man," fears the Lex Scantinia.

It has sometimes been argued that the Lex Scantinia was mainly concerned with the rape of freeborn youth The law may have codified traditional sanctions against stuprum involving men, as a forerunner to the Lex Julia de adulteriis coercendis that criminalized adultery involving women. The early Christian poet Prudentius makes a scathing joke that if Jupiter had been subject to Roman law, he could have been convicted under both the Julian and the Scantinian laws.

Only youths from freeborn families in good standing were protected under the law; children born or sold into slavery, or those who fell into slavery through military conquest, were subject to prostitution or sexual use by their masters. Male prostitutes and entertainers, even if technically "free," were considered infames, of no social standing, and were also excluded from the protections afforded the citizen's body. Although male slaves were sometimes granted freedom in recognition of a favored sexual relationship with their master, in some cases of genuine affection they may have remained legally slaves, since under the Lex Scantinia the couple could have been prosecuted if both were free citizens.

== Prosecutions ==
The infrequency with which the Lex Scantinia is invoked in the literary sources suggests that prosecutions during the Republican era were aimed at harassing political opponents, while those during the reign of Domitian occurred in a general climate of political and moral crisis.

Two letters written to Cicero by Caelius indicate that the law was used as a "political weapon"; ancient Rome had no public prosecutors, and charges could be filed and prosecuted by any citizen with the legal expertise to do so. Abuse of the courts was reined in to some extent by the threat of calumnia, a charge of malicious prosecution, but retaliatory charges motivated by politics or personal enmity, as Caelius makes clear in this case, were not uncommon. In 50 BC, Caelius was engaged in a feud with Appius Claudius Pulcher, the consul of 54 BC and a current censor who had refused to lend him money and with whose sister Caelius had a disastrous love affair. Appius's term as censor was a moral "reign of terror" that stripped multiple senators and equestrians of their rank; sometime during the fall of that year he indicted Caelius, a sitting curule aedile, under the Lex Scantinia. Caelius was happy to respond in kind. Both cases were presided over by the praetor Marcus Livius Drusus Claudianus—ironically, in the view of Caelius, since Drusus himself was "a notorious offender"—and evidently came to nothing. "Few people," Eva Cantarella observed, "were completely free of suspicion in this area."

Although the law remained on the books, it had been largely ignored until Domitian began to enforce it as part of his broad program of judicial reform. The crackdown on public morals included sexual offenses such as adultery and illicit sex (incestum) with a Vestal, and several men from both the senatorial and equestrian order were condemned under the Lex Scantinia.

Quintilian refers to a fine of 10,000 sesterces for committing stuprum with a freeborn male, sometimes construed as referring to the Lex Scantinia, though the law is not named in the passage.

== Name ==
A Roman law (lex, plural leges) was typically named after the official who proposed it, and never after a defendant. In 227 or 226 BC, Gaius Scantinius Capitolinus was put on trial for sexually molesting the son of Marcus Claudius Marcellus; a certain irony would attend the Lex Scantinia if in fact he had been its proposer. It may be that a relative of Scantinius Capitolinus proposed the law in a display of probity to disassociate the family name from the crime. The law has also been dated to 216 BC, when a Publius Scantinius was pontifex, or 149 BC. The earliest direct mention of it occurs in 50 BC, in the correspondence of Cicero, and it appears not at all in the Digest.

== See also ==
- Homosexuality in ancient Rome
- Exoletus
- Fustuarium, sometimes thought to apply to sex acts between fellow soldiers
