= Homosexuality in ancient Rome =

Sexuality in ancient Rome

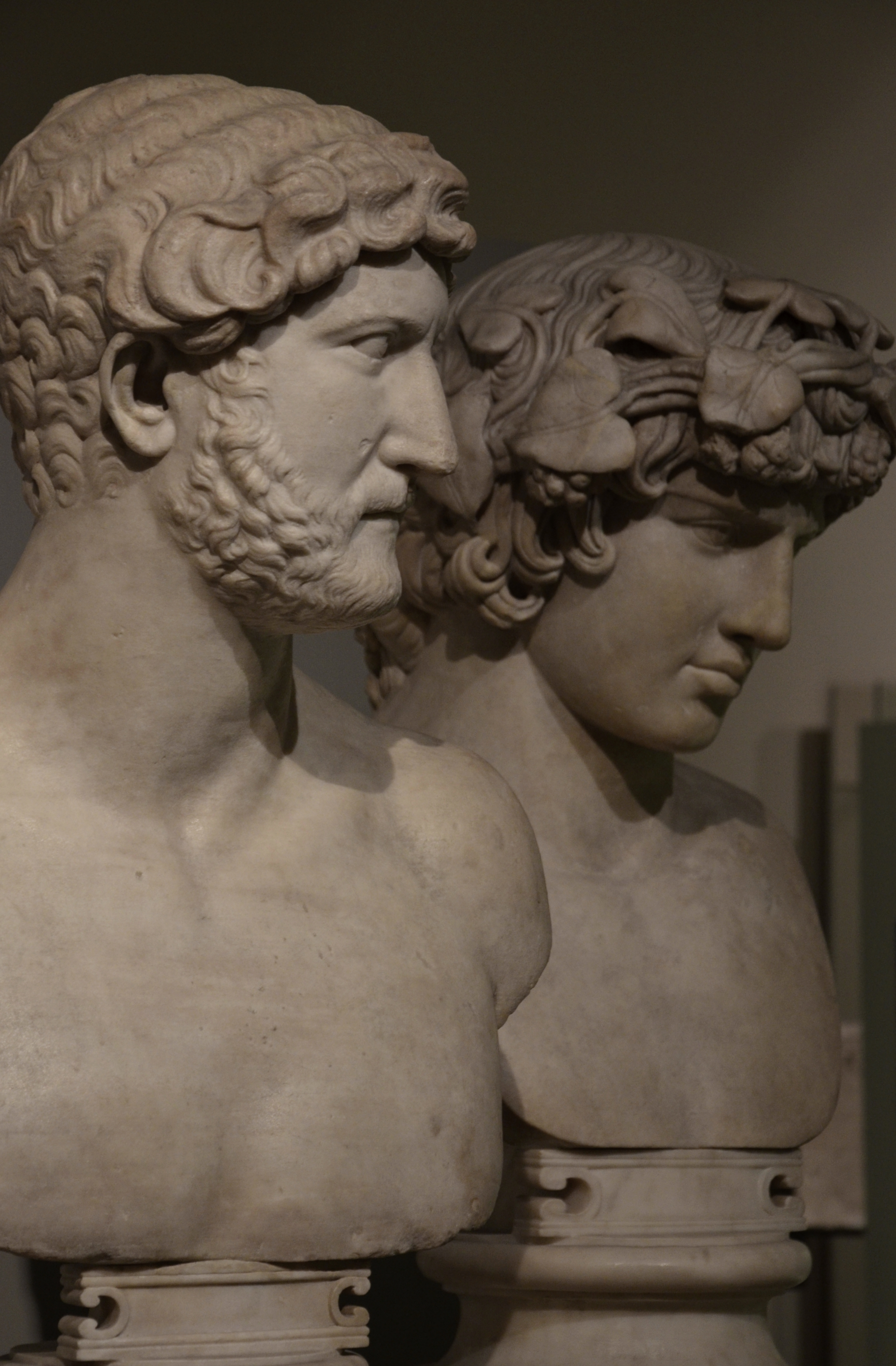
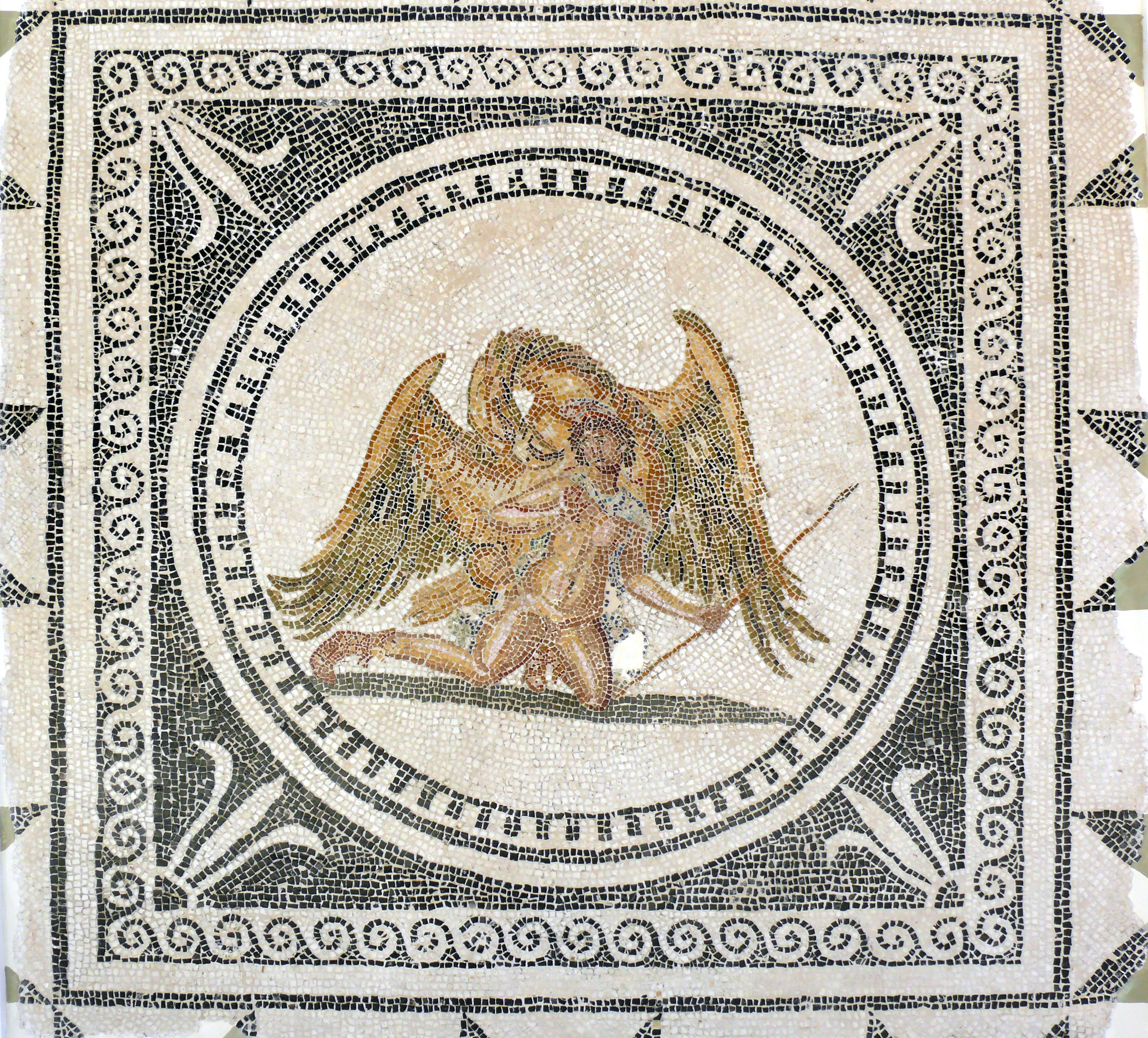
(left) Busts of the Roman emperor Hadrian (left) and his male lover Antinous, now at the British Museum (right) Roman mosaic from Susa, Libya, depicting the myth of Zeus in the form of an eagle abducting the boy Ganymede

Homosexuality in ancient Rome is a subject of research and scholarly debate. Conceptions of homosexuality in ancient Rome differed from the contemporary West. Latin lacks words that would precisely translate "homosexual" and "heterosexual". The primary dichotomy of ancient Roman sexuality was active / dominant / masculine and passive / submissive / feminine. Roman society was patriarchal, and the freeborn male citizen possessed political liberty (libertas) and the right to rule both himself and his household (familia). "Virtue" (virtus) was seen as an active quality through which a man (vir) defined himself.

In a lot of accounts from the Roman era, the conquest mentality and "cult of virility" shaped same-sex relations. Pederasty between males was documented, and such relationships were accepted as long as the Roman man took an active/dominant role and the passive younger male partner was not a freeborn youth/boy. Acceptable male partners were slaves and former slaves, prostitutes, and entertainers, whose lifestyle placed them in the nebulous social realm of infamia, so they were excluded from the normal protections afforded to a citizen even if they were technically free. Freeborn male minors were off limits at certain periods in Rome. It is difficult to know to what extent homosexuality in general and pederasty in particular were practiced in ancient Rome.

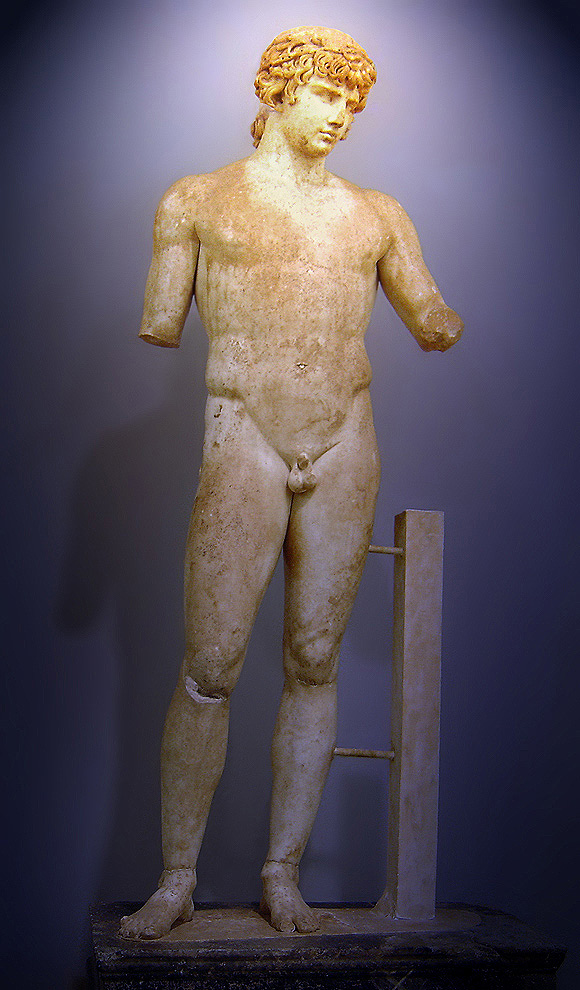
Statue of Antinous (Delphi), polychrome Parian marble depicting Antinous, made during the reign of Hadrian (r. 117–138 AD), his lover

Same-sex relations among women are far less documented and, if Roman writers are to be trusted, female homoeroticism may have been very rare, to the point that Ovid, in the Augustan era, describes it as "unheard-of". However, there is scattered evidence—for example, a couple of spells in the Greek Magical Papyri—which attests to the existence of individual women in Roman-ruled provinces in the later Imperial period who fell in love with members of the same sex.

== Overview ==
During the Republic, a Roman citizen's political liberty (libertas) was defined in part by the right to preserve his body from physical compulsion, including both corporal punishment and sexual abuse. Roman society was patriarchal (see paterfamilias), and masculinity was premised on a capacity for governing oneself and others of lower status. Virtus, "valor" as that which made a man most fully a man, was among the active virtues. Sexual conquest was a common metaphor for imperialism in Roman discourse, and the "conquest mentality" was part of a "cult of virility" that particularly shaped Roman homosexual practices. Roman ideals of masculinity were thus premised on taking an active role that was also, as Craig A. Williams has noted, "the prime directive of masculine sexual behavior for Romans". In the late 20th and early 21st centuries, scholars have tended to view expressions of Roman male sexuality in terms of a "penetrator-penetrated" binary model; that is, the proper way for a Roman male to seek sexual gratification was to insert his penis into his partner. Allowing himself to be penetrated threatened his liberty as a free citizen as well as his sexual integrity.

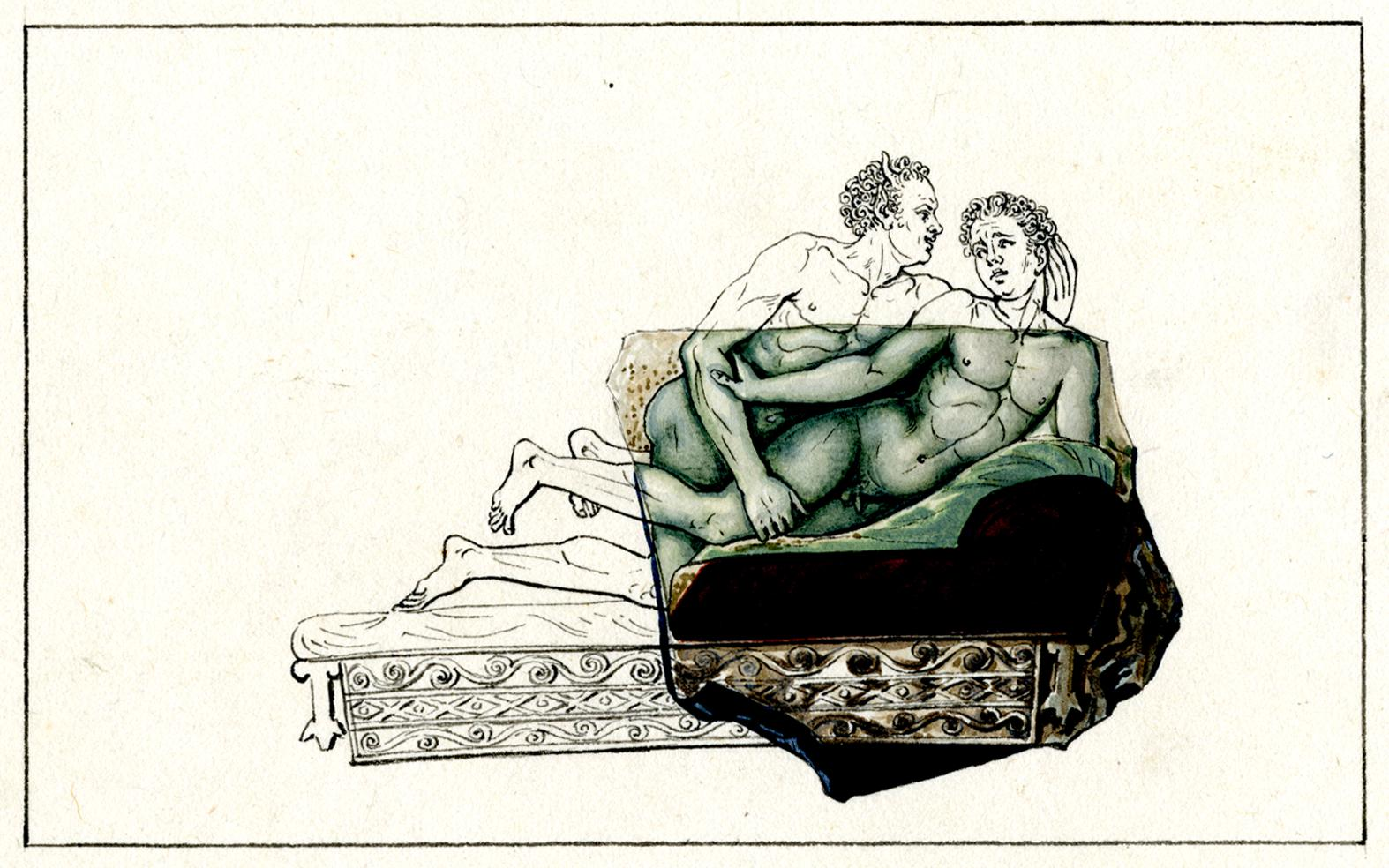
A drawing based on a fragment of an ancient Roman glass vessel. 1826 - 1827 British Museum, London

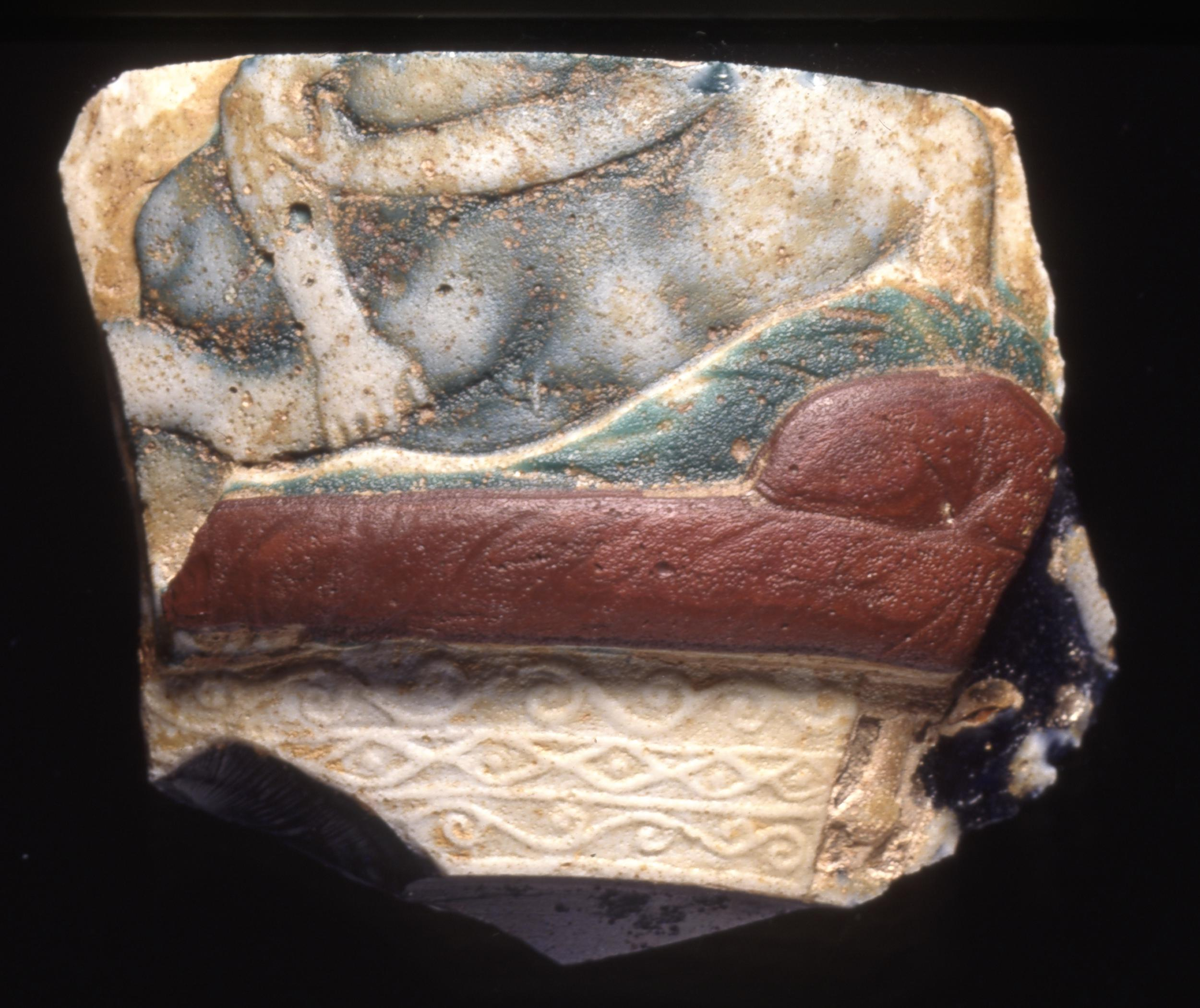
A fragment of a glass vessel showing a homosexual scene. Cameo. Around 15 BCE - 1st Century CE. British Museum, London

It was socially acceptable, though not necessarily respected, for a freeborn Roman man to want sex with both female and male partners, as long as he took an active role and the appropriate partner was a prostitute or slave. Outside of marriage, a man was supposed to act on his desires with only slaves, prostitutes (who were often slaves), and the infames. It was immoral to have sex with another freeborn man's wife, his marriageable daughter, his underage son, or with the man himself; sexual use of another man's slave was subject to the owner's permission. Lack of self-control, including in managing one's sex life, indicated that a man was incapable of governing others; too much indulgence in "low sensual pleasure" threatened to erode the elite male's identity as a cultured person. Some scholars argue that a law, Lex Scantinia, protected freeborn boys from sexual advances of men.

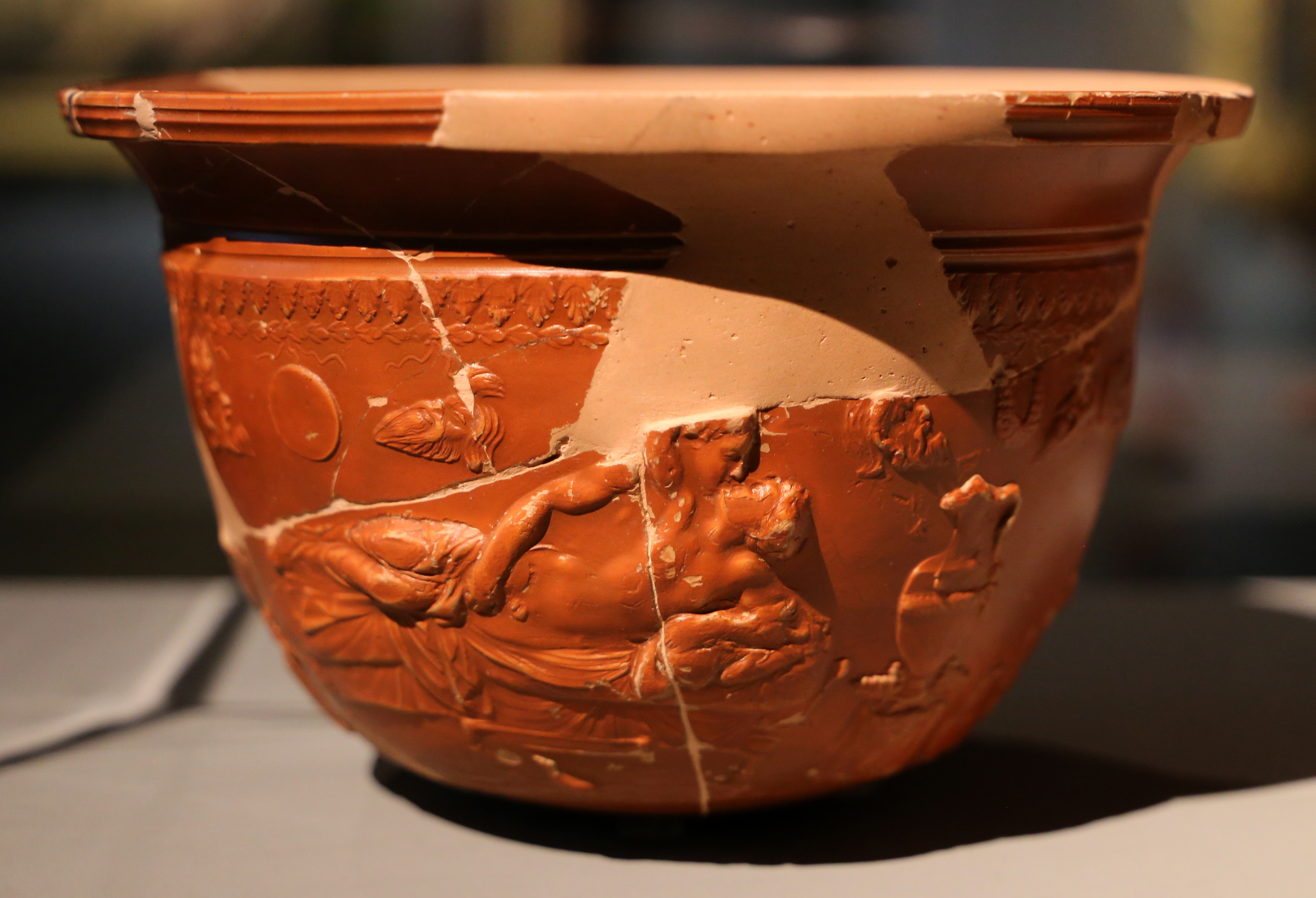
Arretine earthenware with an erotic scene. Artist Unknown. 1st century CE

Homoerotic themes are introduced to Latin literature during a period of increasing Greek influence on Roman culture in the 2nd century BC. While in ancient Greece, pederasty between freeborn male citizens of equal status was idealized by some classical Greek elites, such an attachment to a male outside the family, within Roman society threatened the authority of the paterfamilias. Since Roman women were active in educating their sons and mingled with men socially, and women of the governing classes often continued to advise and influence their sons and husbands in political life, homosociality was not as pervasive in Rome as it had been in Classical Athens, where it is thought to have contributed to the particulars of pederastic culture.

In the Imperial era, a perceived increase in passive homosexual behavior among free males was associated with anxieties about the subordination of political liberty to the emperor, and led to an increase in executions and corporal punishment. The sexual license and decadence under the empire were seen as a contributing factor and symptom of the loss of the ideals of physical integrity (libertas) under the Republic.

== Homoerotic literature and art ==
Love or desire between males is a very frequent theme in Roman literature. In the estimation of Amy Richlin, out of the poems preserved to this day, those addressed by men to boys are as common as those addressed to women, with most of them directed towards slave boys.

Among the works of Roman literature that can be read today, those of Plautus are the earliest to survive in full to modernity, and also the first to mention homosexuality. Their use to draw conclusions about Roman customs or morals, however, is controversial because these works are all based on Greek originals. However, Craig A. Williams defends such use of the works of Plautus. He notes that the homo- and heterosexual exploitation of slaves, to which there are so many references in Plautus' works, is rarely mentioned in Greek New Comedy, and that many of the puns that make such a reference (and Plautus' oeuvre, being comic, is full of them) are only possible in Latin, and can not therefore have been mere translations from the Greek.

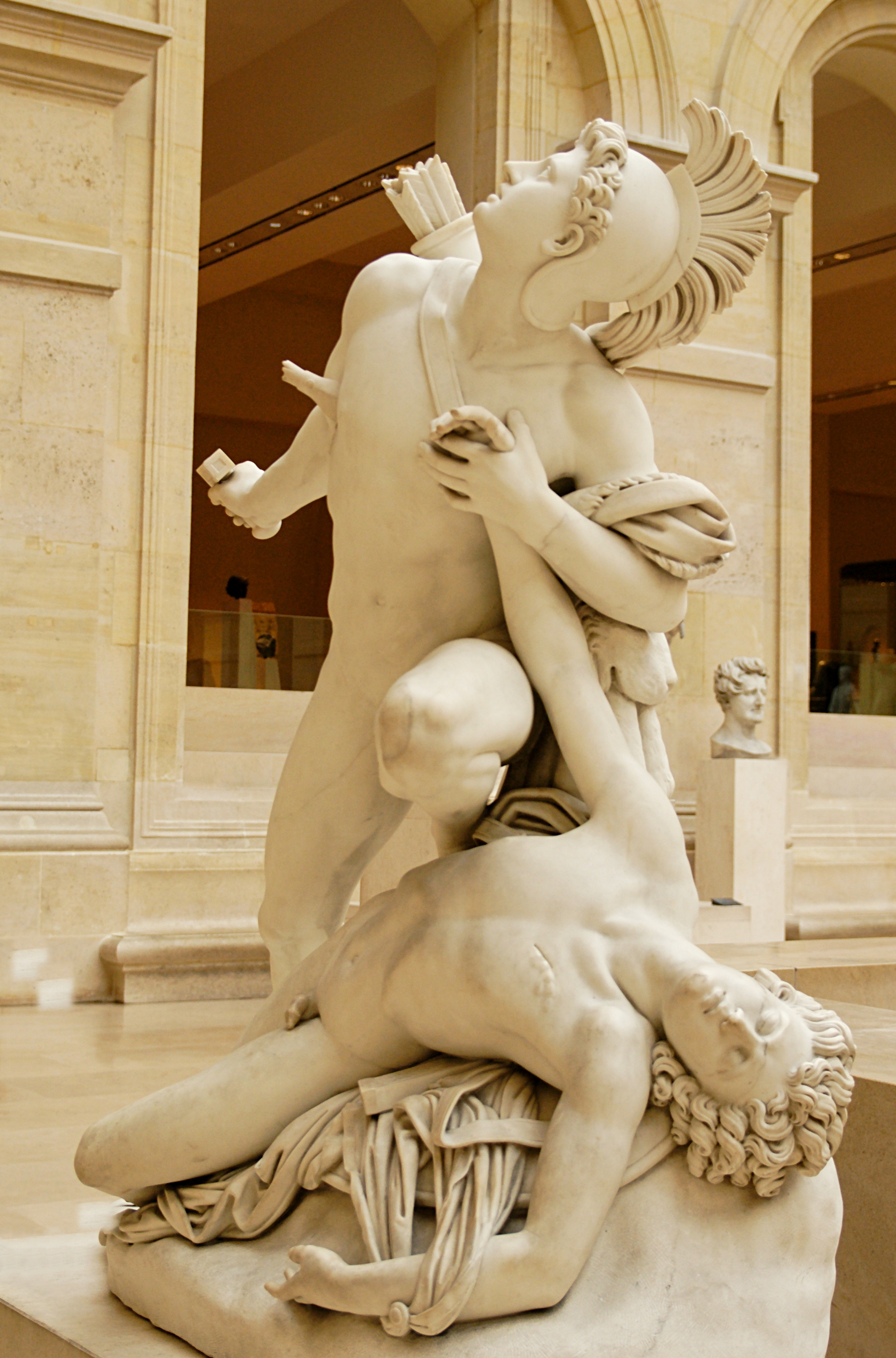
Heroic portrayal of Nisus and Euryalus (1827) by Jean-Baptiste Roman: Vergil described their love as pius in keeping with Roman morality

The consul Quintus Lutatius Catulus was among a circle of poets who made short, light Hellenistic poems fashionable. One of his few surviving fragments is a poem of desire addressed to a male with a Greek name. In the view of Ramsay MacMullen, who is of the opinion that, before the flood of Greek influence, the Romans were against the practice of homosexuality, the elevation of Greek literature and art as models of expression promoted the celebration of homoeroticism as the mark of an urbane and sophisticated person. The opposite view is sustained by Craig Williams, who is critical of Macmullen's discussion on Roman attitudes toward homosexuality: he draws attention to the fact that Roman writers of love poetry gave their beloveds Greek pseudonyms no matter the sex of the beloved. Thus, the use of Greek names in homoerotic Roman poems does not mean that the Romans attributed a Greek origin to their homosexual practices or that homosexual love only appeared as a subject of poetic celebration among the Romans under the influence of the Greeks.

References to homosexual desire or practice, in fact, also appear in Roman authors who wrote in literary styles seen as originally Roman, that is, where the influence of Greek fashions or styles is less likely. In an Atellan farce authored by Quintus Novius (a literary style seen as originally Roman), it is said by one of the characters that "everyone knows that a boy is superior to a woman"; the character goes on to list physical attributes, most of which denote the onset of puberty, that mark boys when they are at their most attractive in the character's view. Also remarked elsewhere in Novius' fragments is that the sexual use of boys ceases after "their butts become hairy". A preference for smooth male bodies over hairy ones is also avowed elsewhere in Roman literature (e.g., in Ode 4.10 by Horace and in some epigrams by Martial or in the Priapeia).

In a work of satires, another literary genre that Romans saw as their own, Gaius Lucilius, a second-century BC poet, draws comparisons between anal sex with boys and vaginal sex with females; it is speculated that he may have written a whole chapter in one of his books with comparisons between lovers of both sexes, though nothing can be stated with certainty, as what remains of his oeuvre is just fragments.

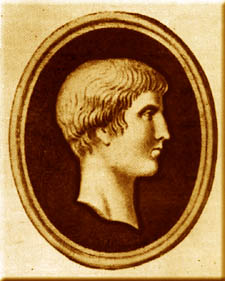
Poets like Martial (above) and Juvenal enthused about the love of boys, but also wrote satires of homosexually passive adult men.

In other satire, as well as in Martial's erotic and invective epigrams, at times boys' superiority over women is remarked (for example, in Juvenal 6). Other works in the genre (e.g., Juvenal 2 and 9, and one of Martial's satires) also give the impression that passive homosexuality was becoming a fad increasingly popular among Roman men of the first century AD, something which is the target of invective from the authors of the satires. The practice itself, however, was perhaps not new, as over a hundred years before these authors, the dramatist Lucius Pomponius wrote a play, Prostibulum (The Prostitute), which today only exists in fragments, where the main character, a male prostitute, proclaims that he has sex with male clients also in the active position.

"New poetry" introduced at the end of the 2nd century included that of Gaius Valerius Catullus, whose work includes expressing desire for a freeborn youth explicitly named "Youth" (Iuventius). The Latin name and freeborn status of the beloved subvert Roman tradition. Catullus's contemporary Lucretius also recognizes the attraction of "boys" (pueri, which can designate an acceptable submissive partner and not specifically age). Homoerotic themes occur throughout the works of poets writing during the reign of Augustus, including elegies by Tibullus and Propertius, several Eclogues of Vergil, especially the second, and some poems by Horace. In the Aeneid, Vergil—who, according to a biography written by Suetonius, had a marked sexual preference for boys—draws on the Greek tradition of pederasty in a military setting by portraying the love between Nisus and Euryalus, whose military valor marks them as solidly Roman men (viri). Vergil describes their love as pius, linking it to the supreme virtue of pietas as possessed by the hero Aeneas himself, and endorsing it as "honorable, dignified and connected to central Roman values".

By the end of the Augustan period Ovid, Rome's leading literary figure, showed a heterosexual preference and love with a woman is more enjoyable because unlike the forms of same-sex behavior permissible within Roman culture, the pleasure is mutual. Even Ovid himself, however, did not claim exclusive heterosexuality and he does include mythological treatments of homoeroticism in the Metamorphoses, but Thomas Habinek has pointed out that the significance of Ovid's rupture of human erotics into categorical preferences has been obscured in the history of sexuality by a later heterosexual bias in Western culture.

Several other Roman writers, however, expressed a bias in favor of males when sex or companionship with males and females were compared, including Juvenal, Lucian, Strato, and the poet Martial, who often derided women as sexual partners and celebrated the charms of pueri. In literature of the Imperial period, the Satyricon of Petronius is so permeated with the culture of male–male sex that in 18th-century European literary circles, his name became "a byword for homosexuality". Pederasty, even with slaves, wasn't always accepted. Musoneus Rufus condemned all sexual acts with either sex, except for procreation within marriage.

=== Sex, art, and everyday objects ===
Homosexuality appears with much less frequency in the visual art of Rome than in its literature. Out of several hundred objects depicting images of sexual contact—from wall paintings and oil lamps to vessels of various types of material—only a small minority exhibits acts between males, and even fewer among females.

Male homosexuality occasionally appears on vessels of numerous kinds, from cups and bottles made of expensive material such as silver and cameo glass to mass-produced and low-cost bowls made of Arretine pottery. This may be evidence that sexual relations between males had the acceptance not only of the elite, but were also openly celebrated or indulged in by the less illustrious, as suggested also by ancient graffiti.

When whole objects rather than mere fragments are unearthed, homoerotic scenes are usually found to share space with pictures of opposite-sex couples, which can be interpreted to mean that heterosexuality and homosexuality (or male homosexuality, in any case) are of equal value. The Warren Cup (discussed below) is an exception among homoerotic objects: it shows only male couples and may have been produced in order to celebrate a world of exclusive homosexuality.

The treatment given to the subject in such vessels is idealized and romantic, similar to that dispensed to heterosexuality. The artist's emphasis, regardless of the sex of the couple being depicted, lies in the mutual affection between the partners and the beauty of their bodies.

Such a trend distinguishes Roman homoerotic art from that of the Greeks. With some exceptions, Greek vase painting attributes desire and pleasure only to the active partner of homosexual encounters, the erastes, while the passive, or eromenos, seems physically unaroused and, at times, emotionally distant. It is now believed that this may be an artistic convention provoked by reluctance on the part of the Greeks to openly acknowledge that Greek males could enjoy taking on a "female" role in an erotic relationship; reputation for such pleasure could have consequences for the future image of the former eromenos when he turned into an adult, and hinder his ability to participate in the socio-political life of the polis as a respectable citizen. Because, among the Romans, normative homosexuality took place, not between freeborn males or social equals as among the Greeks, but between master and slave, client and prostitute or, in any case, between social superior and social inferior, Roman artists may paradoxically have felt more at ease than their Greek colleagues to portray mutual affection and desire between male couples. This may also explain why anal penetration is seen more often in Roman homoerotic art than in its Greek counterpart, where non-penetrative intercourse predominates.

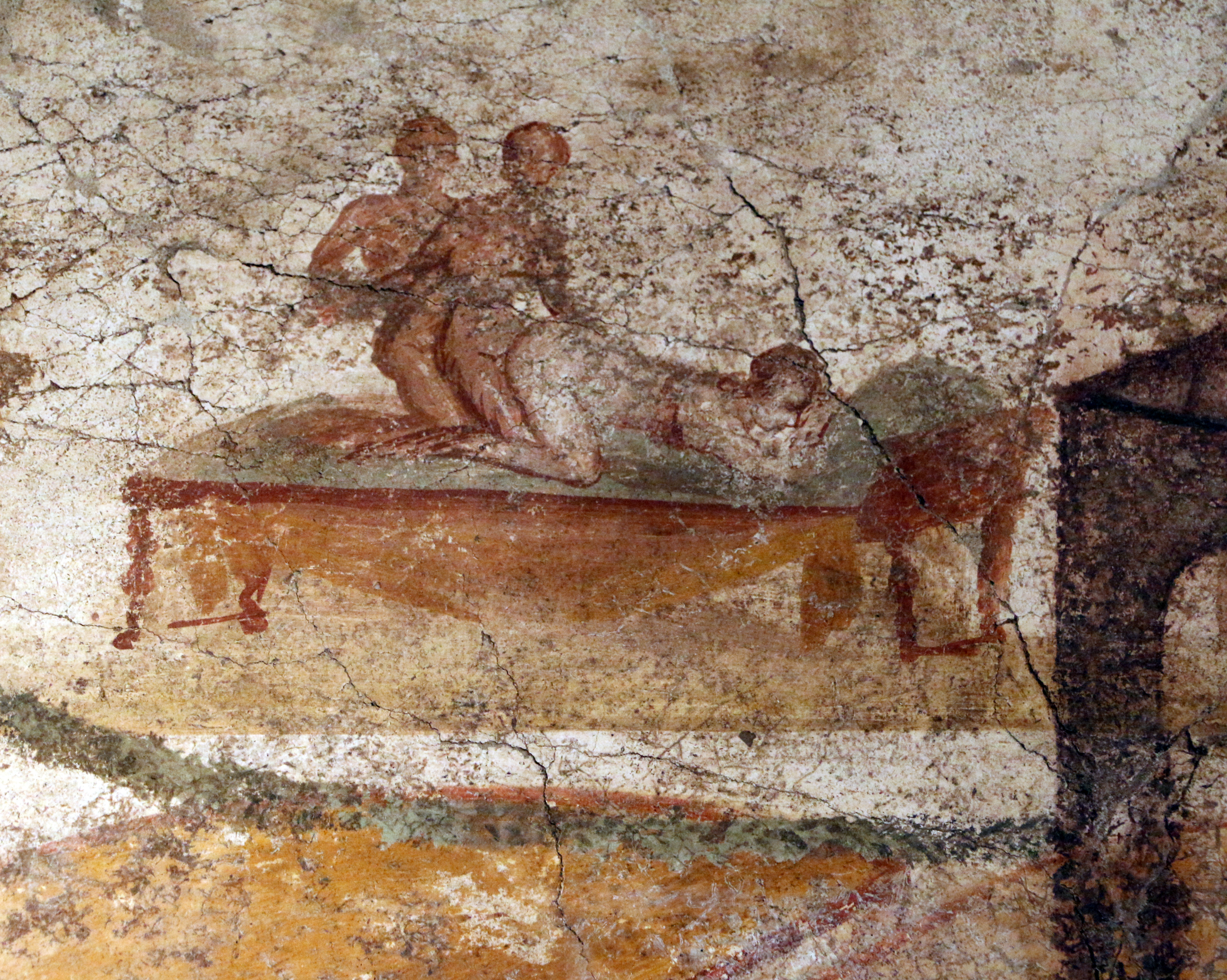
Threesome from the Suburban Baths in Pompeii, depicting a sexual scenario as described also by Catullus, Carmen 56

A wealth of wall paintings of a sexual nature have been spotted in ruins of some Roman cities, notably Pompeii, where there were found the only examples known so far of Roman art depicting sexual congress between women. A frieze at a brothel annexed to the Suburban Baths, in Pompeii, shows a series of sixteen sex scenes, three of which display homoerotic acts: a bisexual threesome with two men and a woman, intercourse by a female couple using a strap-on, and a foursome with two men and two women participating in homosexual anal sex, heterosexual fellatio, and homosexual cunnilingus.

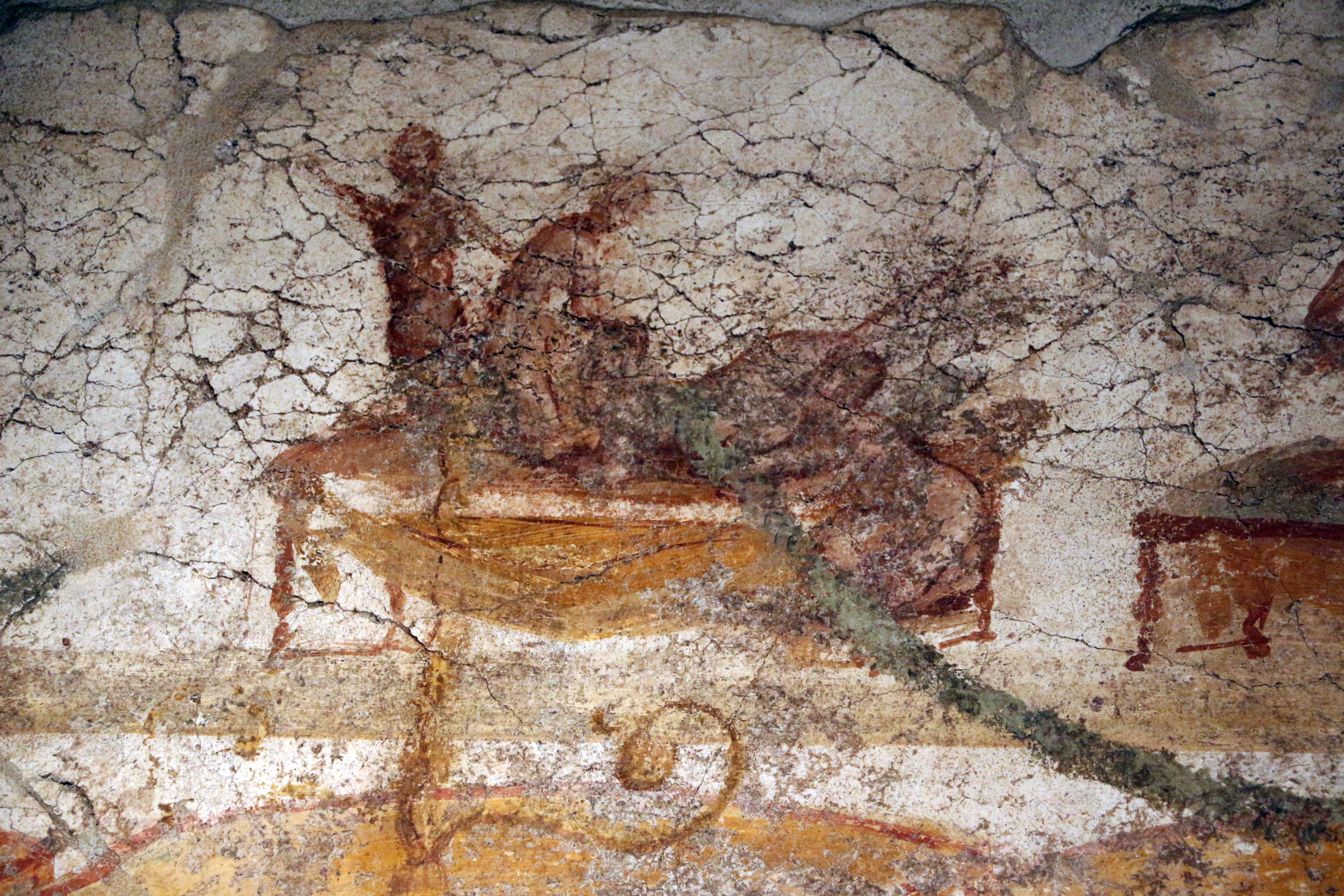
Cunnilingus, fellatio and anal sex between two females and two males - mural. Suburban baths, Pompeii

Contrary to the art of the vessels discussed above, all sixteen images on the mural portray sexual acts considered unusual or debased according to Roman customs: e.g., female sexual domination of men, heterosexual oral sex, passive homosexuality by an adult man, lesbianism, and group sex. Therefore, their portrayal may have been intended to provide a source of ribald humor rather than sexual titillation to visitors of the building.

Threesomes in Roman art typically show two men penetrating a woman, but one of the Suburban scenes has one man entering a woman from the rear while he in turn receives anal sex from a man standing behind him. This scenario is described also by Catullus, Carmen 56, who considers it humorous. The man in the center may be a cinaedus, a male who liked to receive anal sex but who was also considered seductive to women. Foursomes also appear in Roman art, typically with two men and two women, sometimes in same-sex pairings.

Roman attitudes toward male nudity differ from those of the ancient Greeks, who regarded idealized portrayals of the nude male. The wearing of the toga marked a Roman man as a free citizen. Negative connotations of nudity include defeat in war, since captives were stripped, and slavery, since slaves for sale were often displayed naked.

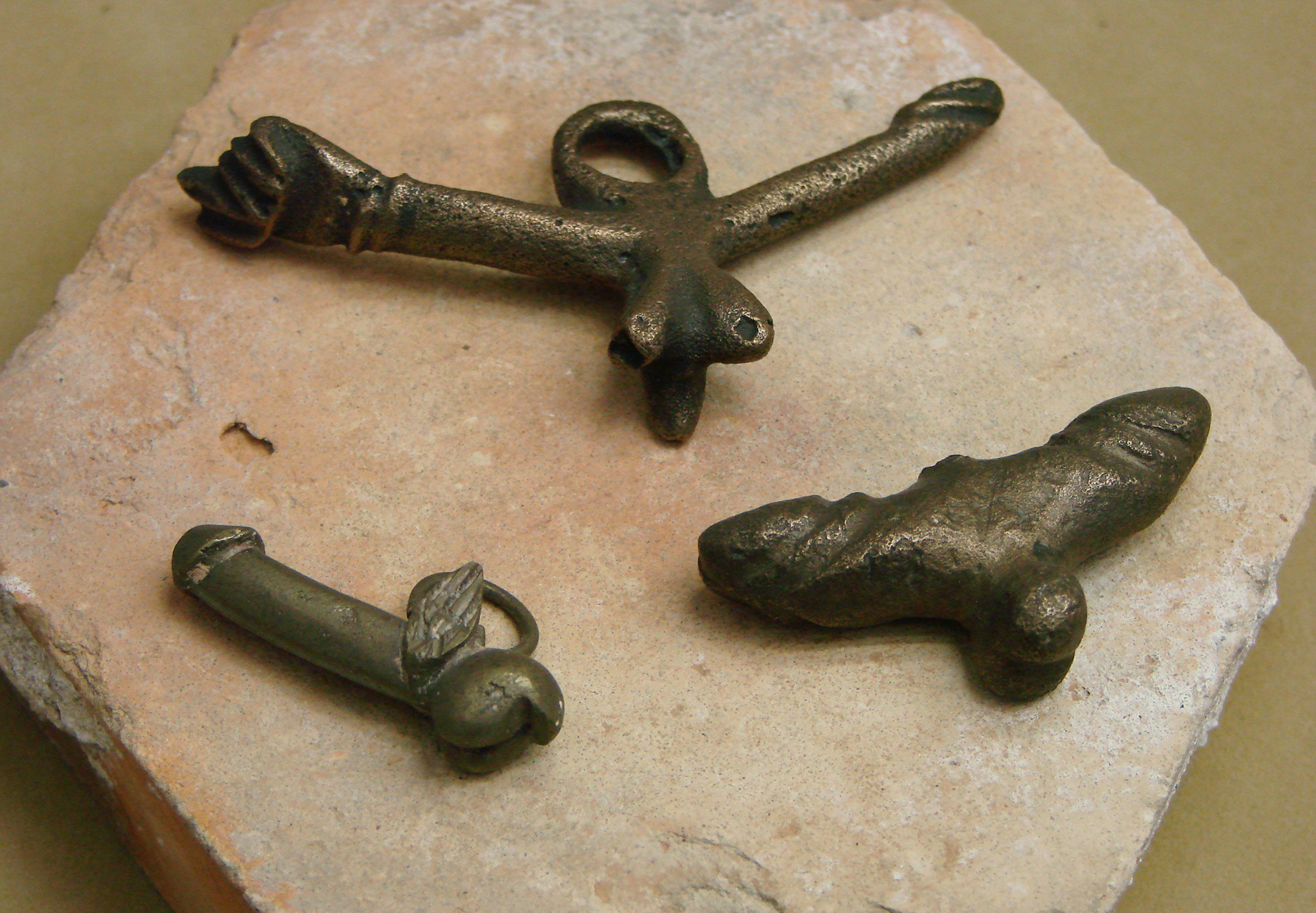
Gallo-Roman bronze examples of the fascinum, a phallic amulet or charm

At the same time, the phallus was displayed ubiquitously in the form of the fascinum, a magic charm thought to ward off malevolent forces; it became a customary decoration, found widely in the ruins of Pompeii, especially in the form of wind chimes (tintinnabula). The outsized phallus of the god Priapus may originally have served an apotropaic purpose, but in art it is frequently laughter-provoking or grotesque. Hellenization, however, influenced the depiction of male nudity in Roman art, leading to more complex signification of the male body shown nude, partially nude, or costumed in a muscle cuirass.

==== Warren Cup ====
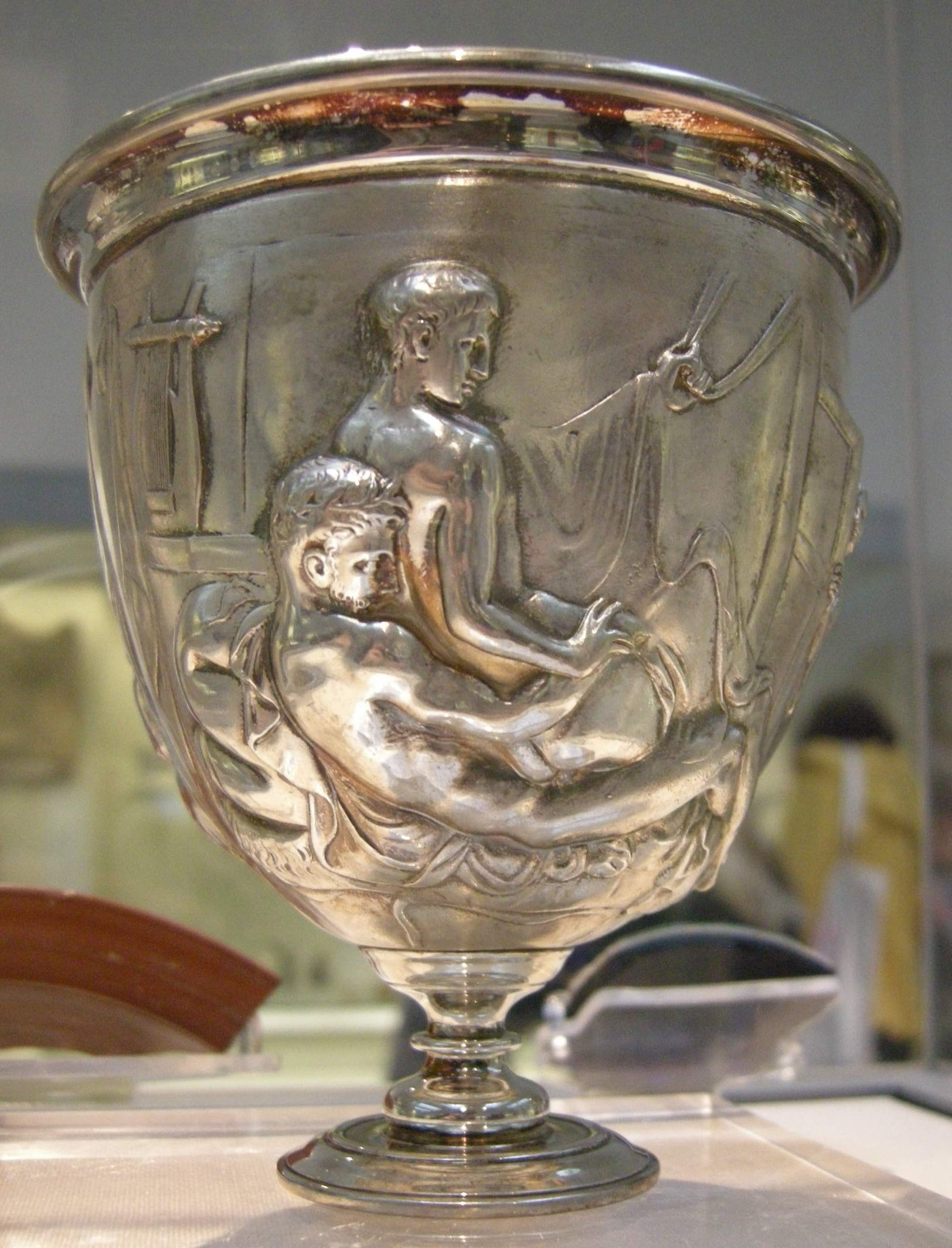
The Warren Cup in the British Museum, portraying a mature bearded man and a youth on its "Greek" side

The Warren Cup is a piece of convivial silver, usually dated to the time of the Julio-Claudian dynasty (1st century AD), that depicts two scenes of male–male sex. It has been argued that the two sides of this cup represent the duality of pederastic tradition at Rome, the Greek in contrast to the Roman. On the "Greek" side, a bearded, mature man is penetrating a young but muscularly developed male in a rear-entry position. The young man, probably meant to be 17 or 18, holds on to a sexual apparatus for maintaining an otherwise awkward or uncomfortable sexual position. A child-slave watches the scene furtively through a door ajar. The "Roman" side of the cup shows a puer delicatus [fig., delicious boy], age 12 to 13, held for intercourse in the arms of an older male, clean-shaven and fit. The bearded pederast may be Greek, with a partner who participates more freely and with a look of pleasure. His counterpart, who has a more severe haircut, appears to be Roman, and thus uses a slave boy; the myrtle wreath he wears symbolizes his role as an "erotic conqueror". The cup may have been designed as a conversation piece to provoke the kind of dialogue on ideals of love and sex that took place at a Greek symposium.

More recently, academic Maria Teresa Marabini Moevs has questioned the authenticity of the cup, while others have published defenses of its authenticity. Marabini Moevs has argued, for example, that the Cup was probably manufactured by the turn of the 19th and 20th centuries and that it supposedly represents perceptions of Greco-Roman homosexuality from that time, whereas defenders of the legitimacy of the cup have highlighted certain signs of ancient corrosion and the fact that a vessel manufactured in the 19th century would have been made of pure silver, whereas the Warren Cup has a level of purity equal to that of other Roman vessels. To address this issue, the British Museum, which holds the utensil, performed a chemical analysis in 2015 to determine the date of its production. The analysis concluded that the silverware was indeed made in classical antiquity.

== Male–male sex ==
=== Roles ===
A man or boy who took the "receptive" role in sex was variously called cinaedus, pathicus, exoletus, amasius (young males), concubinus (male concubine), spint(h)ria ('analist'), puer ('boy'), pullus ('chick'), pusio, delicatus (especially in the phrase puer delicatus, 'exquisite' or 'dainty boy'), mollis ('soft', used more generally as an aesthetic quality counter to the aggressive masculinity), tener ('delicate'), debilis ('weak' or 'disabled'), effeminatus, discinctus ('loose-belted'), pisciculi, and morbosus ('sick'). As Amy Richlin has noted, "'gay' is not exact, 'penetrated' is not self-defined, 'passive' misleadingly connotes inaction" in translating this group of words into English.

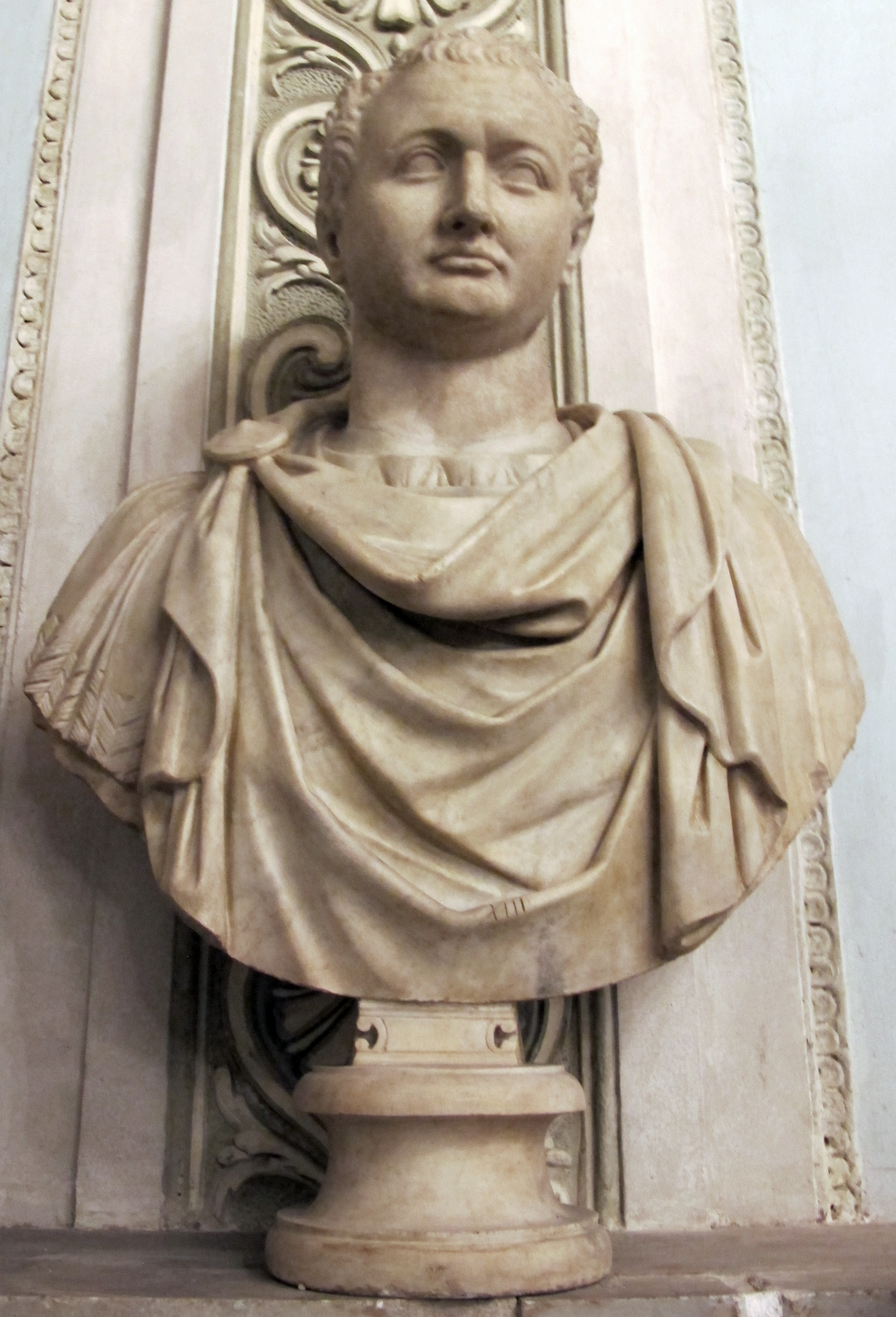
According to Suetonius, emperor Titus (above) kept a great number of exoleti (see below) and eunuchs at his disposal

Some terms, such as exoletus, specifically refer to an adult; Romans who were socially marked as "masculine" did not confine their same-sex penetration of male prostitutes or slaves, amasius, to those who were "boys" under the age of 20. Some older men may have at times preferred the passive role. Martial describes, for example, the case of an older man who played the passive role and let a younger slave occupy the active role. An adult male's desire to be penetrated was considered a sickness (morbus); the desire to penetrate a handsome youth was thought normal.

==== Cinaedus ====
Cinaedus is a derogatory word denoting a male who was gender-deviant; his choice of sex acts, or preference in sexual partner, was secondary to his perceived deficiencies as a 'man' (vir). Catullus directs the slur cinaedus at his friend Furius in his notoriously obscene Carmen 16. Although in some contexts cinaedus may denote an anally passive man and is the most frequent word for a male who allowed himself to be penetrated anally, a man called cinaedus might also have sex with and be considered highly attractive to women. In Epigrams 7.58, Martial satirises a woman named Galla who has been 'married' to cinaedi on six to seven occasions for her attraction to their tender, effeminate appearance, though the 'marriage' ended unsatisfactorily as each cinaedus had a penis as tender and effeminate as his appearance, which Galla has found attractive. Cinaedus is not equivalent to the English vulgarism "faggot", except that both words can be used to deride a male considered deficient in manhood or with androgynous characteristics whom women may find sexually alluring.

The clothing, use of cosmetics, and mannerisms of a cinaedus marked him as effeminate, but the same effeminacy that Roman men might find alluring in a puer became unattractive in the physically mature male. The cinaedus thus represented the absence of what Romans considered true manhood, and the word is virtually untranslatable into English.

Originally, a cinaedus (Greek kinaidos) was a professional dancer, characterized as non-Roman or "Eastern"; the word itself may come from a language of Asia Minor. His performance featured tambourine-playing and movements of the buttocks that suggested anal intercourse. The Cinaedocolpitae, an Arabian tribe recorded in Greco-Roman sources of the 2nd and 3rd centuries, may have a name derived from this meaning.

==== Concubinus ====
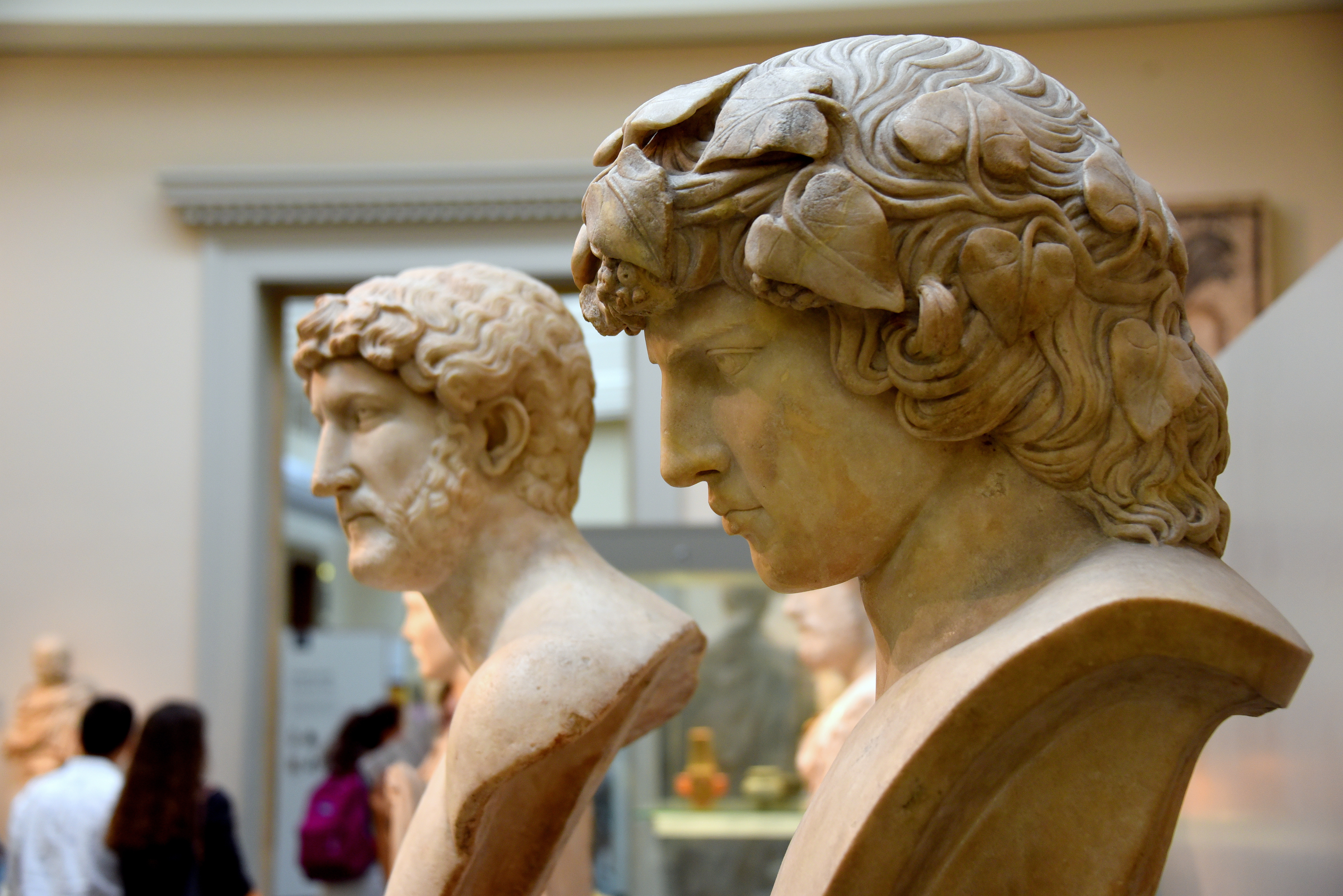
The young Antinous was likely the primary partner of the emperor Hadrian (both pictured above), despite the fact that the latter was married

Some Roman men kept a male concubine (concubinus, "one who lies with; a bed-mate") before they married a woman. Eva Cantarella has described this form of concubinage as "a stable sexual relationship, not exclusive but privileged". Within the hierarchy of household slaves, the concubinus seems to have been regarded as holding a special or elevated status that was threatened by the introduction of a wife. In a wedding hymn, Catullus portrays the groom's concubinus as anxious about his future and fearful of abandonment. His long hair will be cut, and he will have to resort to the female slaves for sexual gratification—indicating that he is expected to transition from being a receptive sex object to one who performs penetrative sex. The concubinus might father children with women of the household, not excluding the wife (at least in invective). The feelings and situation of the concubinus are treated as significant enough to occupy five stanzas of Catullus's wedding poem. He plays an active role in the ceremonies, distributing the traditional nuts that boys threw (rather like rice or birdseed in the modern Western tradition).

The relationship with a concubinus might be discreet or more open: male concubines sometimes attended dinner parties with the man whose companion they were. Martial even suggests that a prized concubinus might pass from father to son as an especially coveted inheritance. A military officer on campaign might be accompanied by a concubinus. Like the catamite or puer delicatus, the role of the concubine was regularly compared to that of Ganymede, the Trojan prince abducted by Jove (Greek Zeus) to serve as his cupbearer.

The concubina, a female concubine who might be free, held a protected legal status under Roman law, but the concubinus did not, since he was typically a slave.

==== Amasius ====
The term amasius functioned as a colloquial label for a male lover or a "kept" youth, often blurring the line between a romantic partner and a male prostitute. In the Roman comedies of Plautus, the word is frequently used to describe younger males who provide sexual favors in exchange for gifts or financial support. Unlike the amator, who was the active pursuer, the amasius occupied a passive role that carried significant social stigma. This transactional relationship aligned the amasius with the broader category of the scortum, a term used for professional prostitutes. In later satirical texts, the word highlighted the loss of status associated with selling one's body, distinguishing these individuals from the respectable citizens of the Roman Empire.

==== Exoletus ====
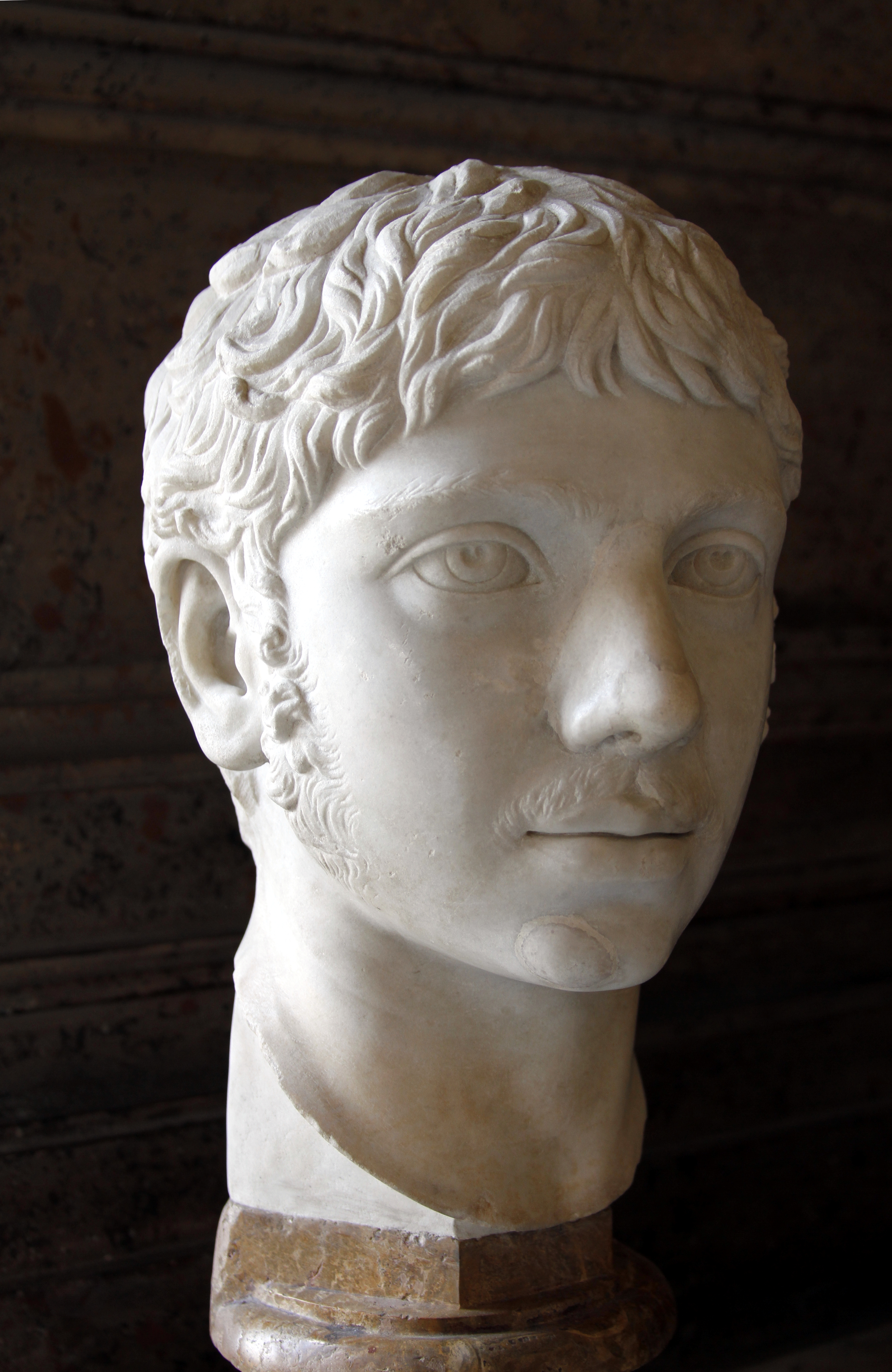
Head of Emperor Elagabalus, said to have surrounded himself with exoleti

Exoletus (pl. exoleti) is the past-participle form of the verb exolescere, which means "to grow up" or "to grow old". The term denotes a male prostitute who services another sexually despite the fact that he himself is past his prime according to the ephebic tastes of Roman homoerotism. Though adult men were expected to take on the role of "penetrator" in their love affairs, such a restriction did not apply to exoleti. In their texts, Pomponius and Juvenal both included characters who were adult male prostitutes and had as clients male citizens who sought their services so they could take a "female" role in bed (see above). In other texts, however, exoleti adopt a receptive position.

The relationship between the exoletus and his partner could begin when he was still a boy and the affair then extended into his adulthood. It is impossible to say how often this happened. For even if there was a tight bond between the couple, the general social expectation was that pederastic affairs would end once the younger partner grew facial hair. As such, when Martial celebrates in two of his epigrams (1.31 and 5.48) the relationship of his friend, the centurion Aulens Pudens, with his slave Encolpos, the poet more than once gives voice to the hope that the latter's beard comes late, so that the romance between the pair may last long. Continuing the affair beyond that point could result in damage to the master's repute. Some men, however, insisted on ignoring this convention.

Exoleti appear with certain frequency in Latin texts, both fictional and historical, unlike in Greek literature, suggesting perhaps that adult male-male sex was more common among the Romans than among the Greeks. Ancient sources impute the love of, or the preference for, exoleti (using this or equivalent terms) to various figures of Roman history, such as the tribune Clodius, the emperors Tiberius, Galba, Titus, and Elagabalus, besides other figures encountered in anecdotes, told by writers such as Tacitus, on more ordinary citizens.

==== Pathicus ====
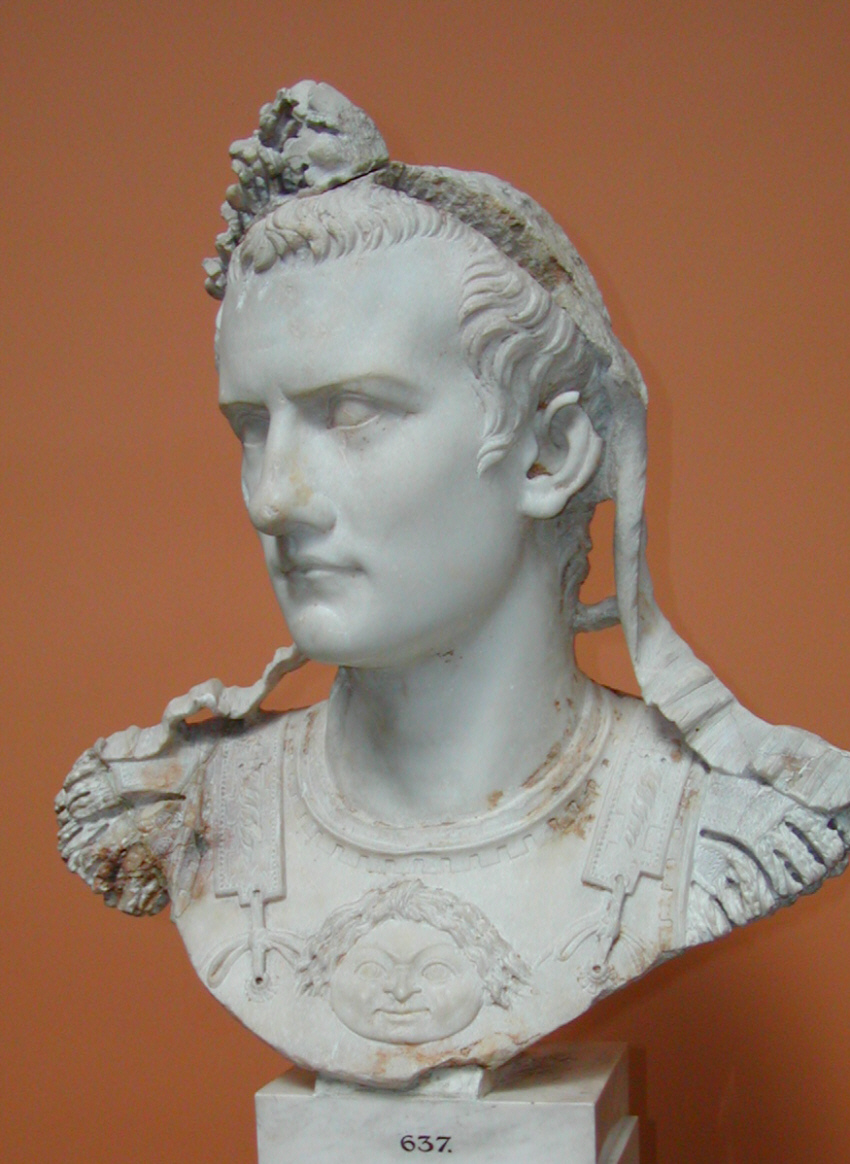
A young aristocrat by the name of Valerius Catullus boasted of penetrating the emperor Caligula (above) during a lengthy intimate session

Pathicus was a "blunt" word for a male who was penetrated sexually. It derived from the unattested Greek adjective pathikos, from the verb paskhein, equivalent to the Latin deponent patior, pati, passus, "undergo, submit to, endure, suffer". The English word "passive" derives from the Latin passus.

Pathicus and cinaedus are often not distinguished in usage by Latin writers, but cinaedus may be a more general term for a male not in conformity with the role of vir, a "real man", while pathicus specifically denotes an adult male who takes the sexually receptive role. A pathicus was not a "homosexual" as such. His sexuality was not defined by the gender of the person using him as a receptacle for sex, but rather his desire to be so used. Because in Roman culture a man may penetrate another adult male to express contempt or revenge, the pathicus might be seen as more akin to the sexual masochist in his experience of pleasure. He might be penetrated orally or anally by a man or by a woman with a dildo, but showed no desire for penetrating nor having his own penis stimulated. He might also be dominated by a woman who compels him to perform cunnilingus.

==== Puer ====
In the discourse of sexuality, puer ("boy") was a role as well as an age group. Both puer and the feminine equivalent puella, "girl", could refer to a man's sexual partner, regardless of age. As an age designation, the freeborn puer made the transition from childhood at around age 14, when he assumed the "toga of manhood", but he was 17 or 18 before he began to take part in public life. A slave would never be considered a vir, a "real man"; he would be called puer, "boy", throughout his life. Pueri might be "functionally interchangeable" with women as receptacles for sex, but freeborn male minors were strictly off-limits. To accuse a Roman man of being someone's "boy" was an insult that impugned his manhood, particularly in the political arena. The aging cinaedus or an anally passive man might wish to present himself as a puer.

==== Puer delicatus ====
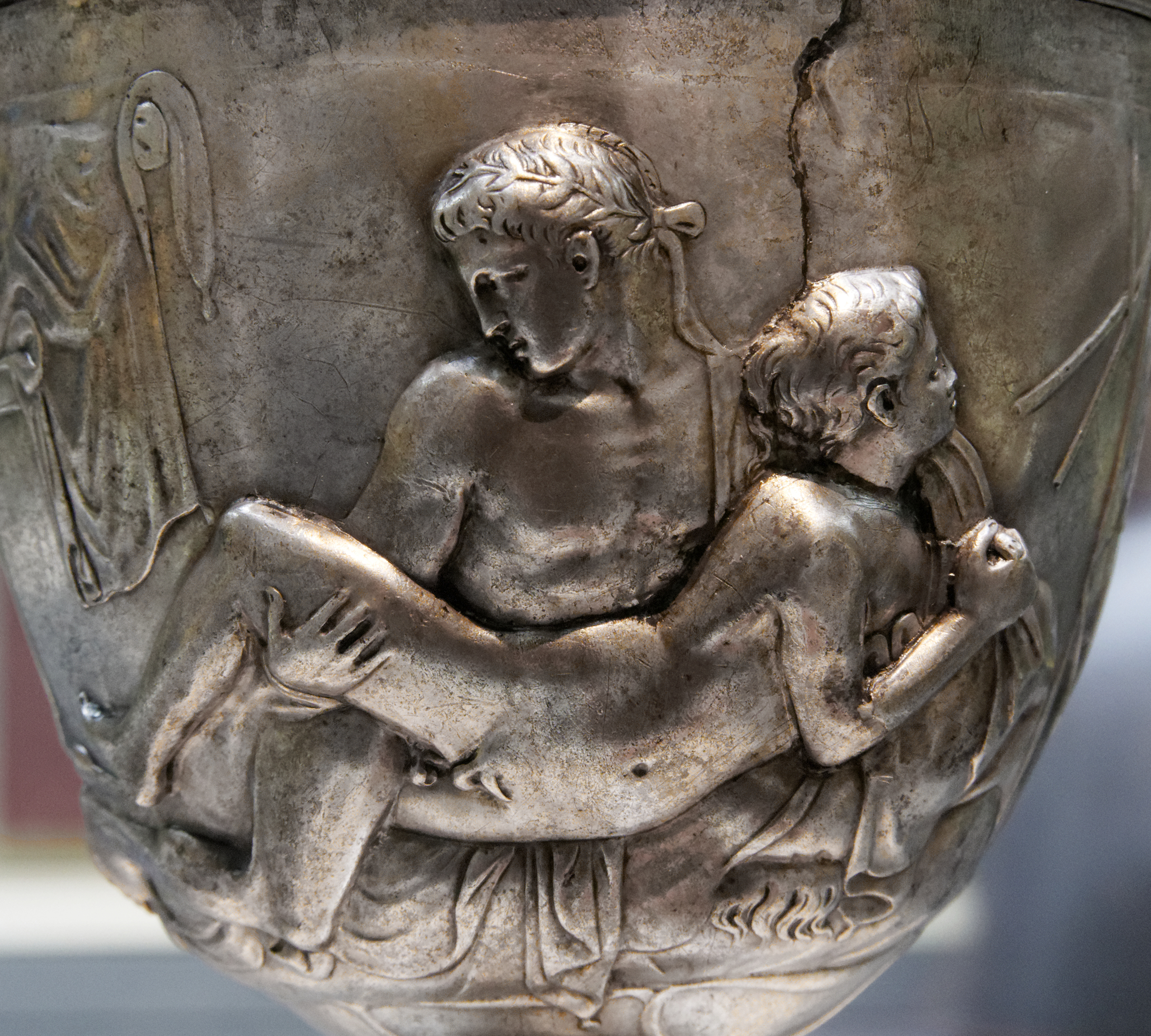
"Roman" side of the Warren Cup, with the wreathed "erotic conqueror" and his puer delicatus ("dainty boy"). British Museum, London.

The puer delicatus was an "exquisite" or "dainty" child-slave chosen by his master for his beauty as a "boy toy", also referred to as deliciae ("sweets" or "delights"). Unlike the freeborn Greek eromenos ("beloved"), who was protected by social custom, the Roman delicatus was in a physically and morally vulnerable position. The "coercive and exploitative" relationship between the Roman master and the delicatus, who might be prepubescent, can be characterized as pedophilic, in contrast to Greek paiderasteia.

Funeral inscriptions found in the ruins of the imperial household under Augustus and Tiberius also indicate that deliciae were kept in the palace and that some slaves, male and female, worked as beauticians for these boys. One of Augustus' pueri is known by name: Sarmentus.

The boy was sometimes castrated in an effort to preserve his youthful qualities; Caroline Vout asserts that the emperor Nero's eunuch Sporus, whom he castrated and married, may have been a puer delicatus.

Pueri delicati might be idealized in poetry and the relationship between him and his master may be painted in what his master viewed as strongly romantic colors. In the Silvae, Statius composed two epitaphs (2.1 and 2.6) to commemorate the relationship of two of his friends with their respective delicati upon the death of the latter. These poems have been argued to demonstrate that such relationships could have an emotional dimension, and it is known from inscriptions in Roman ruins that men could be buried with their delicati, which is evidence of the degree of control that masters would not relinquish, even in death, as well as of a sexual relationship in life.

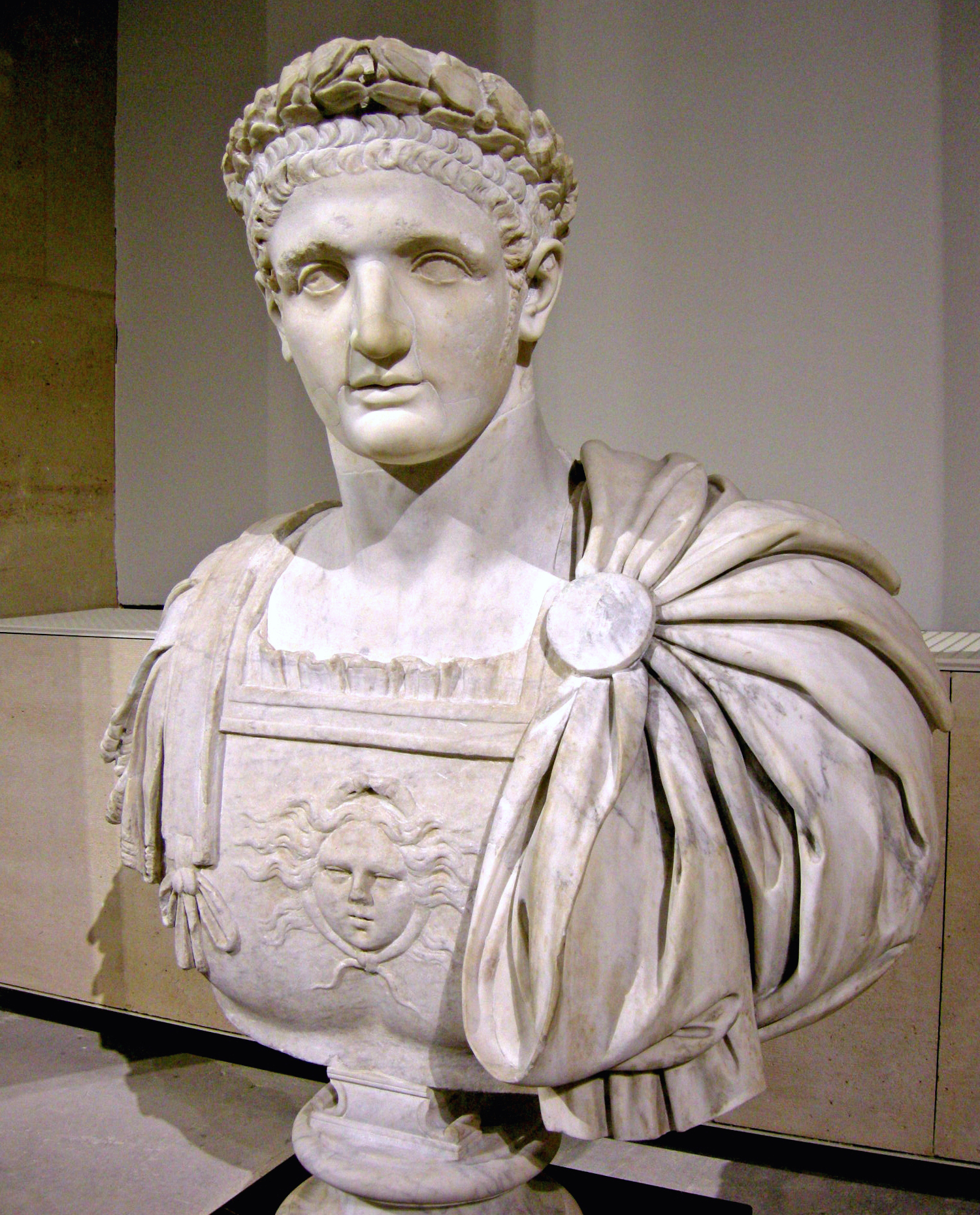
Emperor Domitian

Both Martial and Statius in a number of poems celebrate the freedman Earinus, a eunuch, and his devotion to the emperor Domitian. Statius goes as far as to describe this relationship as a marriage (3.4).

In the erotic elegies of Tibullus, the delicatus Marathus wears lavish and expensive clothing. The beauty of the delicatus was measured by Apollonian standards, especially in regard to his long hair, which was supposed to be wavy, fair, and scented with perfume. The mythological type of the delicatus was represented by Ganymede, the Trojan youth abducted by Jove (Greek Zeus) to be his divine companion and cupbearer. In the Satyricon, the tastelessly wealthy freedman Trimalchio says that as a child-slave he had been a puer delicatus serving both the master and, secretly, the mistress of the household.

==== Pullus ====
Pullus was a term for a young animal, and particularly a chick. It was an affectionate word traditionally used for a boy (puer) who was loved by someone "in an obscene sense".

The lexicographer Festus provides a definition and illustrates it with a comic anecdote. Quintus Fabius Maximus Eburnus, a consul in 116 BC and later a censor known for his moral severity, earned his cognomen meaning "Ivory" (the modern equivalent might be "Porcelain") because of his fair good looks (candor). Eburnus was said to have been struck by lightning on his buttocks, perhaps a reference to a birthmark. It was joked that he was marked as "Jove's chick" (pullus Iovis), since the characteristic instrument of the king of the gods was the lightning bolt (see also the relation of Jove's cupbearer Ganymede to "catamite"). Although the sexual inviolability of underage male citizens is usually emphasized, this anecdote is among the evidence that even the most well-born youths might go through a phase in which they could be viewed as "sex objects". Perhaps tellingly, this same member of the illustrious Fabius family ended his life in exile, as punishment for killing his own son for impudicitia.

The 4th-century Gallo-Roman poet Ausonius records the word pullipremo, "chick-squeezer", which he says was used by the early satirist Lucilius.

==== Pusio ====
Pusio is etymologically related to puer, and means "boy, lad". It often had a distinctly sexual or sexually demeaning connotation. Juvenal indicates the pusio was more desirable than women because he was less quarrelsome and would not demand gifts from his lover. Pusio was also used as a personal name (cognomen).

==== Scultimidonus ====
Scultimidonus ("asshole-bestower") was rare and "florid" slang that appears in a fragment from the early Roman satirist Lucilius. It is glossed as "Those who bestow for free their scultima, that is, their anal orifice, which is called the scultima as if from the inner parts of whores" (scortorum intima).

=== Impudicitia ===
The abstract noun impudicitia (adjective impudicus) was the negation of pudicitia, "sexual morality, chastity". As a characteristic of males, it often implies the willingness to be penetrated. Dancing was an expression of male impudicitia.

Impudicitia might be associated with behaviors in young men who retained a degree of boyish attractiveness but were old enough to be expected to behave according to masculine norms. Julius Caesar was accused of bringing the notoriety of infamia upon himself, both when he was about 19, for taking the passive role in an affair with King Nicomedes of Bithynia, and later for many adulterous affairs with women. Seneca the Elder noted that "impudicitia is a crime for the freeborn, a necessity in a slave, a duty for the freedman": male–male sex in Rome asserted the power of the citizen over slaves, confirming his masculinity.

=== Subculture ===
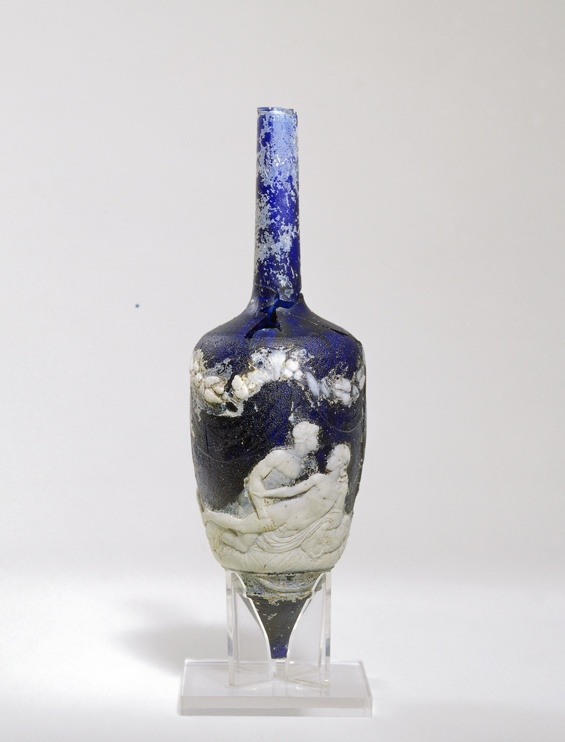
Perfume bottle made of cameo glass found in the Roman necropolis of Ostippo (Spain). Side B of the bottle, shown above, shows two young men in bed. Side A, not shown, shows a man and a woman. The George Ortiz Collection 25 BCE - 14 CE

Latin had such a wealth of words for men outside the masculine norm that some scholars argue for the existence of a homosexual subculture at Rome; that is, although the noun "homosexual" has no straightforward equivalent in Latin, literary sources reveal a pattern of behaviors among a minority of free men that indicate same-sex preference or orientation. Plautus mentions a street known for male prostitutes. Public baths are also referred to as a place to find sexual partners. Juvenal states that such men scratched their heads with a finger to identify themselves. In his 9th satire, Juvenal describes the life of a male gigolo who earned his living servicing rich, passive homosexual men.

Apuleius indicates that cinaedi might form social alliances for mutual enjoyment, such as hosting dinner parties. In his novel The Golden Ass, he describes one group who jointly purchased and shared a concubinus. On one occasion, they invited a "well-endowed" young hick (rusticanus iuvenis) to their party, and took turns performing oral sex on him.

Other scholars, primarily those who argue from the perspective of social constructionism, maintain that there is not an identifiable social group of males who would have self-identified as "homosexual" as a community.

=== Marriage between males ===
Although in general the Romans regarded marriage as a male–female union for the purpose of producing children, a few scholars believe that in the early Imperial period some male couples were celebrating traditional marriage rites in the presence of friends. Male–male weddings are reported by sources that mock them. Both Martial and Juvenal refer to marriage between males as something that occurs not infrequently, although they disapprove of it. Roman law did not recognize marriage between males, but one of the grounds for disapproval expressed in Juvenal's satire is that celebrating the rites would lead to expectations for such marriages to be registered officially. As the empire was becoming Christianized in the 4th century, legal prohibitions against marriage between males began to appear.

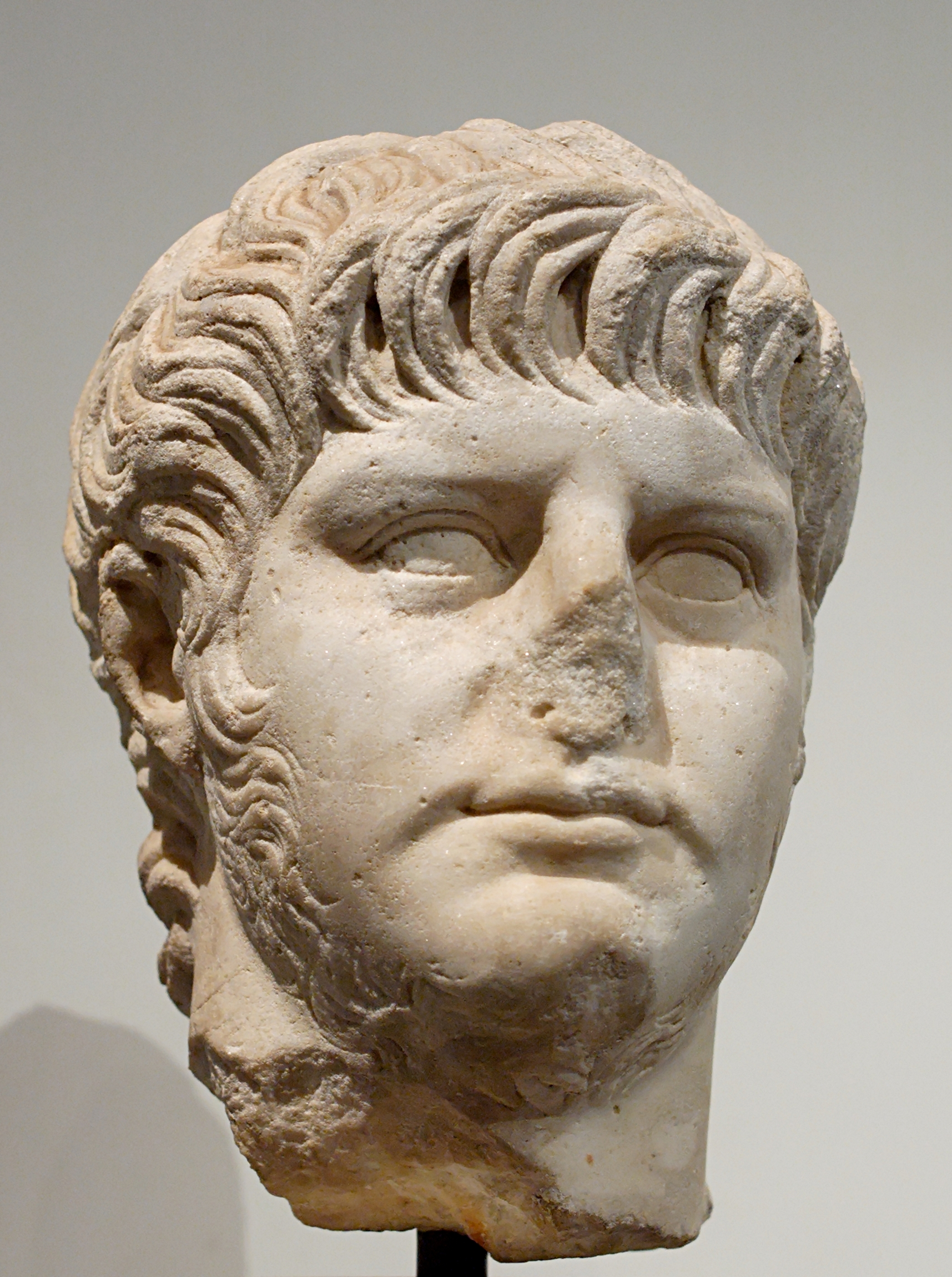
Emperor Nero

Various ancient sources state that the emperor Nero celebrated two public weddings with males, once taking the role of the bride (with a freedman Pythagoras), and once the groom (with Sporus); there may have been a third in which he was the bride. The ceremonies included traditional elements such as a dowry and the wearing of the Roman bridal veil. In the early 3rd century AD, the emperor Elagabalus is reported to have been the bride in a wedding to his male partner. Other mature men at his court had husbands, or said they had husbands in imitation of the emperor. Although the sources are in general hostile, Dio Cassius implies that Nero's stage performances were regarded as more scandalous than his marriages to men.

The earliest reference in Latin literature to a marriage between males occurs in the Philippics of Cicero, who insulted Mark Antony for being promiscuous in his youth until Curio "established you in a fixed and stable marriage (matrimonium), as if he had given you a stola", the traditional garment of a married woman. Although Cicero's sexual implications are clear, the point of the passage is to cast Antony in the submissive role in the relationship and to impugn his manhood in various ways; there is no reason to think that actual marriage rites were performed.

=== Male–male rape ===
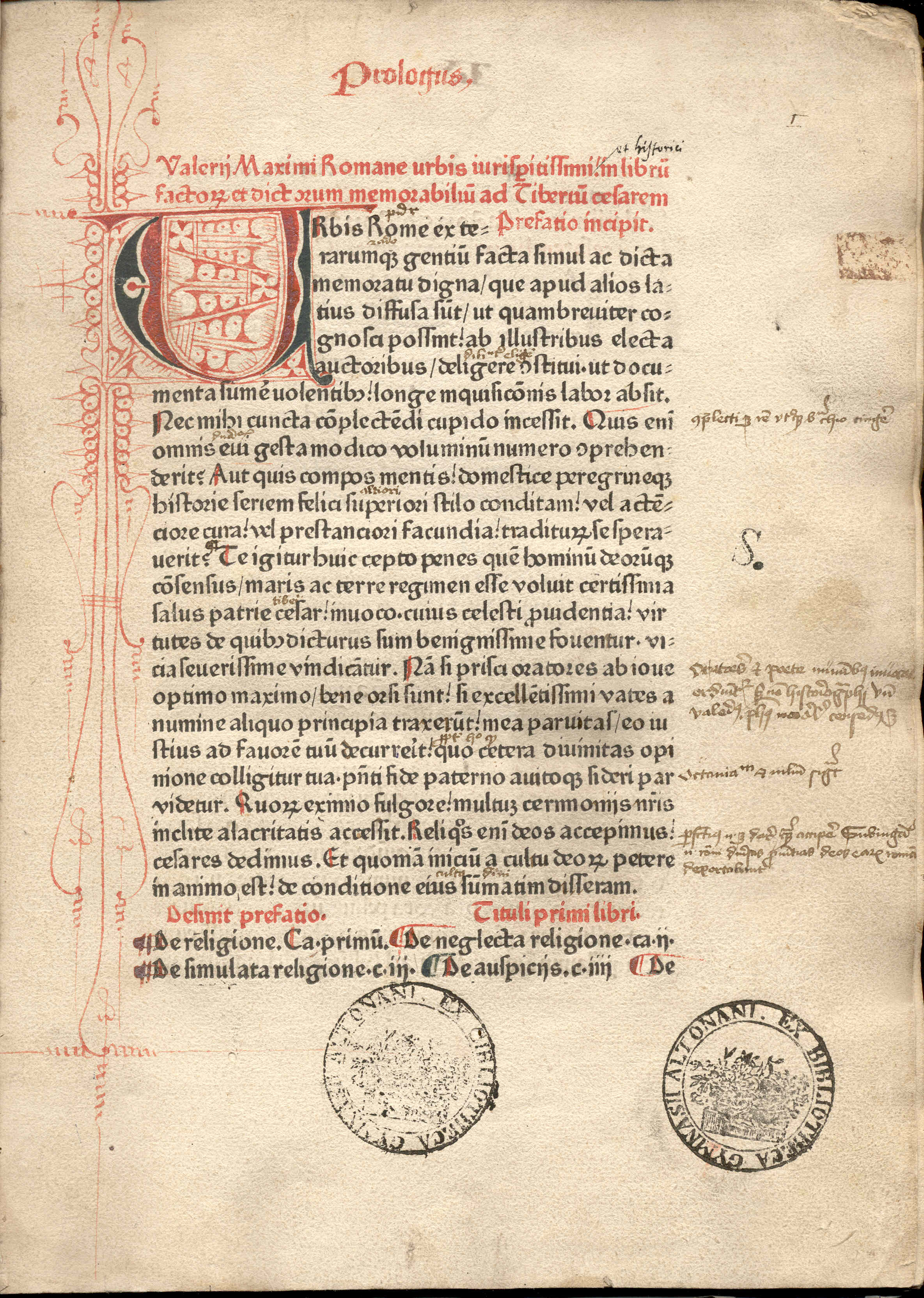
Page from an incunable of Valerius Maximus, Factorum ac dictorum memorabilium libri IX, printed in red and black by Peter Schöffer (Mainz, 1471).

Roman law addressed the rape of a male citizen as early as the 2nd century BC, when it was ruled that even a man who was "disreputable and questionable" (famosus, related to infamis, and suspiciosus) had the same right as other free men not to have his body subjected to forced sex. The Lex Julia de vi publica, recorded in the early 3rd century AD but probably dating from the dictatorship of Julius Caesar, defined rape as forced sex against "boy, woman, or anyone"; the rapist was subject to execution, a rare penalty in Roman law. Men who had been raped were exempt from the loss of legal or social standing suffered by those who submitted their bodies to use for the pleasure of others; a male prostitute, an amasius or entertainer was infamis and excluded from the legal protections extended to citizens in good standing. As a matter of law, a slave could not be raped; he was considered property and not legally a person. The slave's owner, however, could prosecute the rapist for property damage.

Fears of mass rape following a military defeat extended equally to male and female potential victims. According to the jurist Pomponius, "whatever man has been raped by the force of robbers or the enemy in wartime" ought to bear no stigma.

The threat of one man to subject another to anal or oral rape (irrumatio) is a theme of invective poetry, most notably in Catullus's notorious Carmen 16, and was a form of masculine braggadocio. Rape was one of the traditional punishments inflicted on a male adulterer by the wronged husband, though perhaps more in revenge fantasy than in practice.

In a collection of twelve anecdotes dealing with assaults on chastity, the historian Valerius Maximus features male victims in equal number to female. In a "mock trial" case described by the elder Seneca, an adulescens (a man young enough not to have begun his formal career) was gang-raped by ten of his peers; although the case is hypothetical, Seneca assumes that the law permitted the successful prosecution of the rapists. Another hypothetical case imagines the extremity to which a rape victim might be driven: the freeborn male (ingenuus) who was raped commits suicide. The Romans considered the rape of an ingenuus to be among the worst crimes that could be committed, along with parricide, the rape of a female virgin, and robbing a temple.

=== Same-sex relations in the military ===
The Roman soldier, like any free and respectable Roman male of status, was expected to show self-discipline in matters of sex. Augustus (reigned 27 BC – 14 AD) even prohibited soldiers from marrying, a ban that remained in force for the Imperial army for nearly two centuries. Other forms of sexual gratification available to soldiers were prostitutes of any gender, male slaves, war rape, and same-sex relations. The Bellum Hispaniense, about Caesar's civil war on the front in Roman Spain, mentions an officer who has a male concubine (concubinus) on campaign. Sex among fellow soldiers, however, violated the Roman decorum against intercourse with another freeborn male. A soldier maintained his masculinity by not allowing his body to be used for sexual purposes.

In warfare, rape symbolized defeat, a motive for the soldier not to make his body sexually vulnerable in general. During the Republic, homosexual behavior among fellow soldiers was subject to harsh penalties, including death, as a violation of military discipline. Polybius (2nd century BC) reports that the punishment for a soldier who willingly submitted to penetration was the fustuarium, clubbing to death.

Roman historians record cautionary tales of officers who abuse their authority to coerce sex from their soldiers, and then suffer dire consequences. The youngest officers, who still might retain some of the adolescent attraction that Romans favored in male–male relations, were advised to beef up their masculine qualities by not wearing perfume, nor trimming nostril and underarm hair. An incident related by Plutarch in his biography of Marius illustrates the soldier's right to maintain his sexual integrity despite pressure from his superiors. A good-looking young recruit named Trebonius had been sexually harassed over a period of time by his superior officer, who happened to be Marius's nephew, Gaius Lusius. One night, after having fended off unwanted advances on numerous occasions, Trebonius was summoned to Lusius's tent. Unable to disobey the command of his superior, he found himself the object of a sexual assault and drew his sword, killing Lusius. A conviction for killing an officer typically resulted in execution. When brought to trial, he was able to produce witnesses to show that he had repeatedly had to fend off Lusius, and "had never prostituted his body to anyone, despite offers of expensive gifts". Marius not only acquitted Trebonius in the killing of his kinsman, but gave him a crown for bravery.

=== Sex acts ===
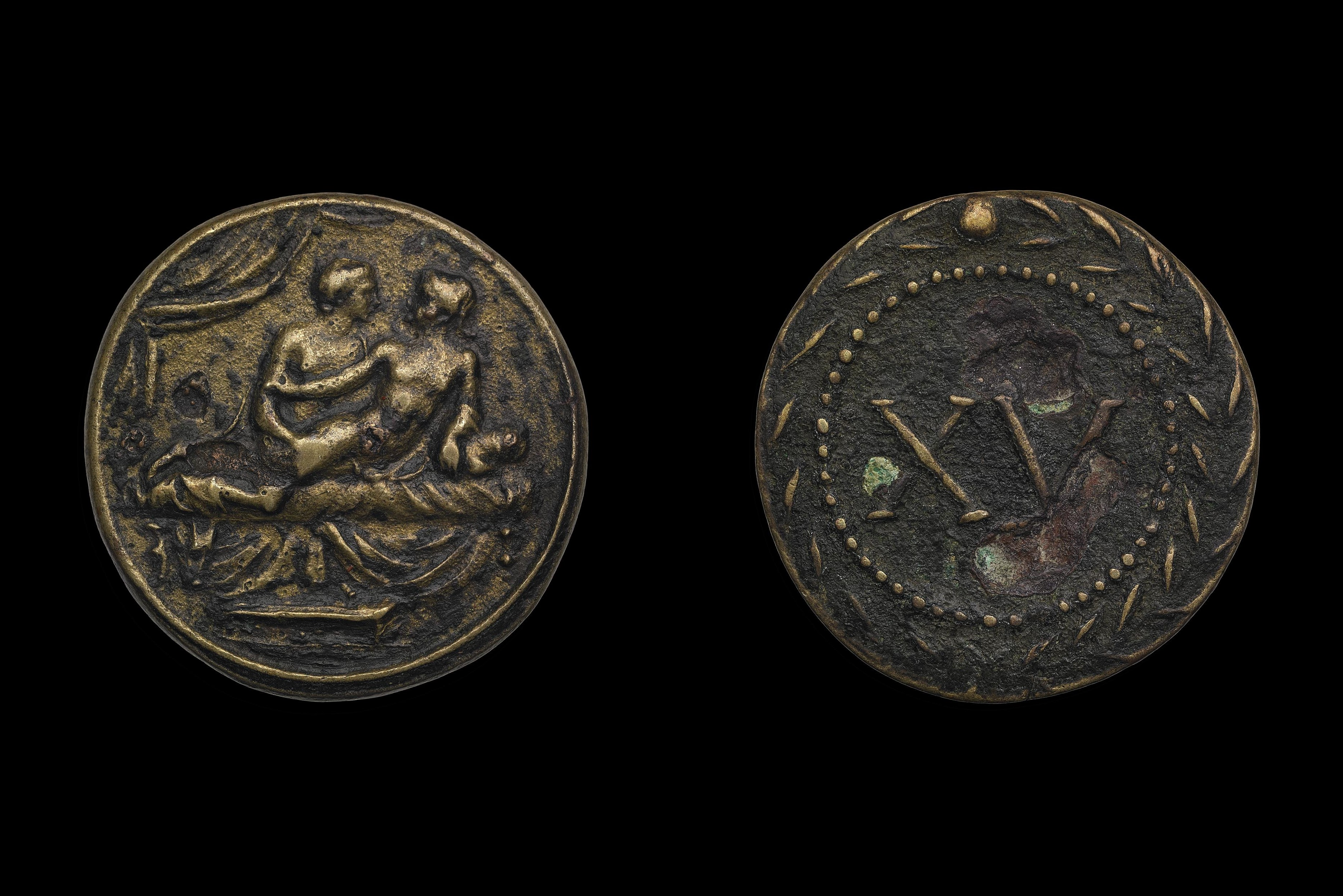
Spintria token with sex between two males on a bed. On the reverse side is the numeral XV. Around 22 to 79 CE.

In addition to repeatedly described anal intercourse, oral sex was common. A graffito from Pompeii is unambiguous: "Secundus is a fellator of rare ability" (Secundus felator rarus). In contrast to ancient Greece, a large penis was a major element in attractiveness. Petronius describes a man with a large penis in a public bathroom. Several emperors are reported in a negative light for surrounding themselves with men with large sexual organs.

The Gallo-Roman poet Ausonius (4th century AD) makes a joke about a male threesome that depends on imagining the configurations of group sex:

"Three men in bed together: two are sinning, two are sinned against."
"Doesn't that make four men?"
"You're mistaken: the man on either end is implicated once, but the one in the middle does double duty."

In other words, a 'train' is being alluded to: the first man penetrates the second, who in turn penetrates the third. The first two are "sinning", while the last two are being "sinned against".

== Lesbianism in ancient Rome ==
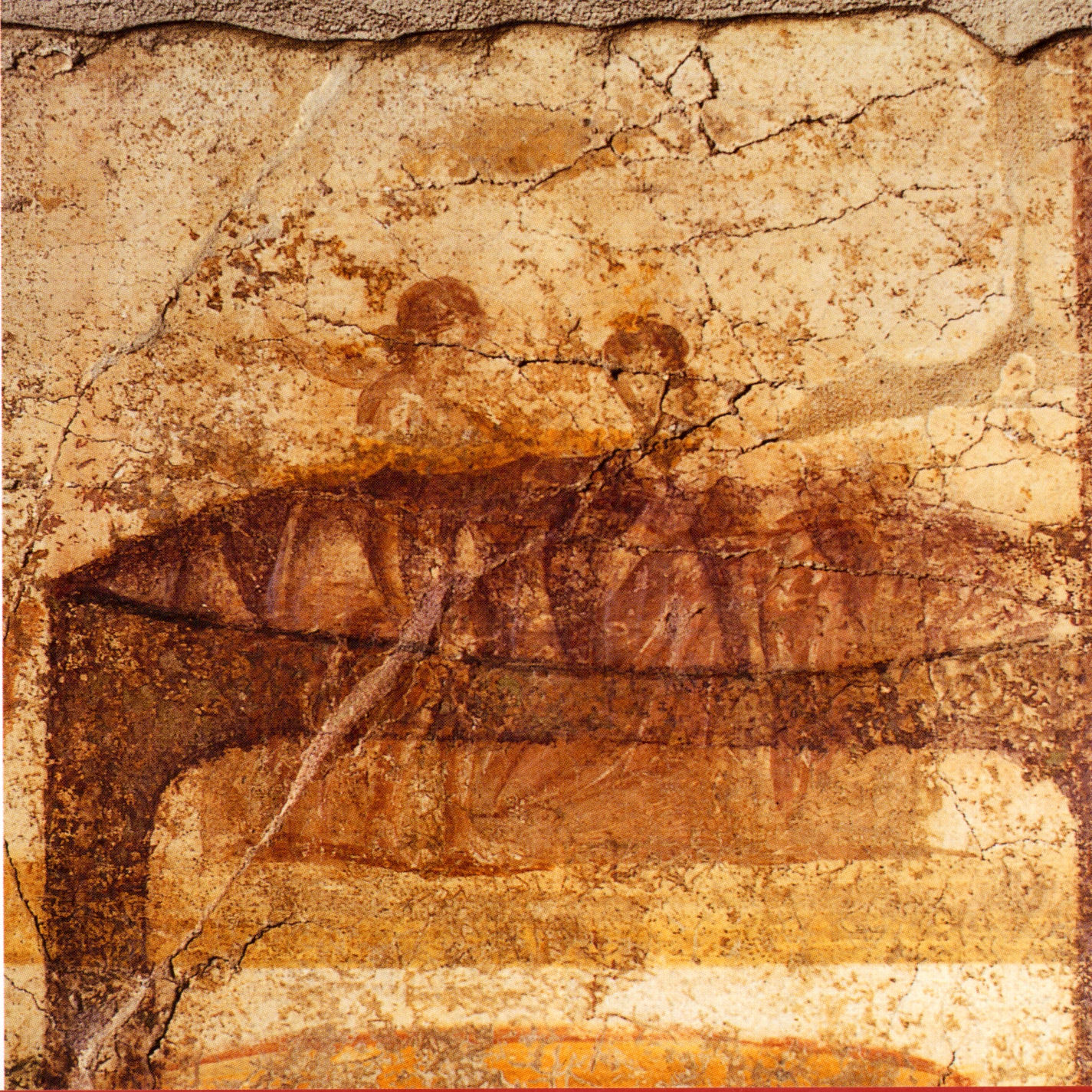
Female couple from a series of erotic paintings at the Suburban Baths, Pompeii

=== Roman Sexual Norms ===
Modern scholarship indicates that ancient Roman men viewed lesbianism with hostility. According to scholar James Butrica, lesbianism "challenged not only the Roman male's view of himself as the exclusive giver of sexual pleasure but also the most basic foundations of Rome's male-dominated culture". No historical documentation exists of or from particular Roman women who had other women as partners.

References to sex between women are infrequent in the Roman literature of the Republic and early Principate. During the Roman Imperial era, sources for same-sex relations among women, though still rare, are more abundant, in the form of love spells, medical writing, texts on astrology and the interpretation of dreams, and other sources.

Since Romans thought a sex act required an active or dominant partner who was "phallic", male writers imagined that in female–female sex one of the women would use a dildo or have an exceptionally large clitoris for penetration, and that she would be the one experiencing pleasure. Dildos are rarely mentioned in Roman sources, but were a popular comic item in Classical Greek literature and art. There is only one known depiction of a woman penetrating another woman in Roman art, whereas women using dildos is common in Greek vase painting.

Martial describes women acting sexually actively with other women as having outsized sexual appetites and performing penetrative sex on both women and boys. Imperial portrayals of women who sodomize boys, drink and eat like men, and engage in vigorous physical regimens may reflect cultural anxieties about the growing independence of Roman women.

=== Pompeiian Graffiti ===
While graffiti written in Latin by men in Roman ruins commonly express desire for both males and females, graffiti attributed to women overwhelmingly express desire only for males, though one graffito from Pompeii may be an exception, and has been read by many scholars as depicting the desire of one woman for another:

I wish I could hold to my neck and embrace the little arms, and bear kisses on the tender lips. Go on, doll, and trust your joys to the winds; believe me, light is the nature of men.

The poem is written with feminine declensions for both speaker and addressee, and identified archivally as Corpus Inscriptionum Latinarum 4.5296.

Other readings, unrelated to female homosexual desire, are also possible. According to Roman studies scholar Craig Williams, the verses can also be read as, "a poetic soliloquy in which a woman ponders her own painful experiences with men and addresses herself in Catullan manner; the opening wish for an embrace and kisses express a backward-looking yearning for her man."

=== Roman-Era Greek References ===
Greek words for a woman who prefers sex with another woman include hetairistria (compare hetaira, "courtesan" or "companion"), tribas (plural tribades), and Lesbia; Latin words include the loanword tribas, fricatrix ("she who rubs"), and virago. An early reference to same-sex relations among women is found in the Roman-era Greek writer Lucian (2nd century CE): "They say there are women like that in Lesbos, masculine-looking, but they don't want to give it up for men. Instead, they consort with women, just like men."

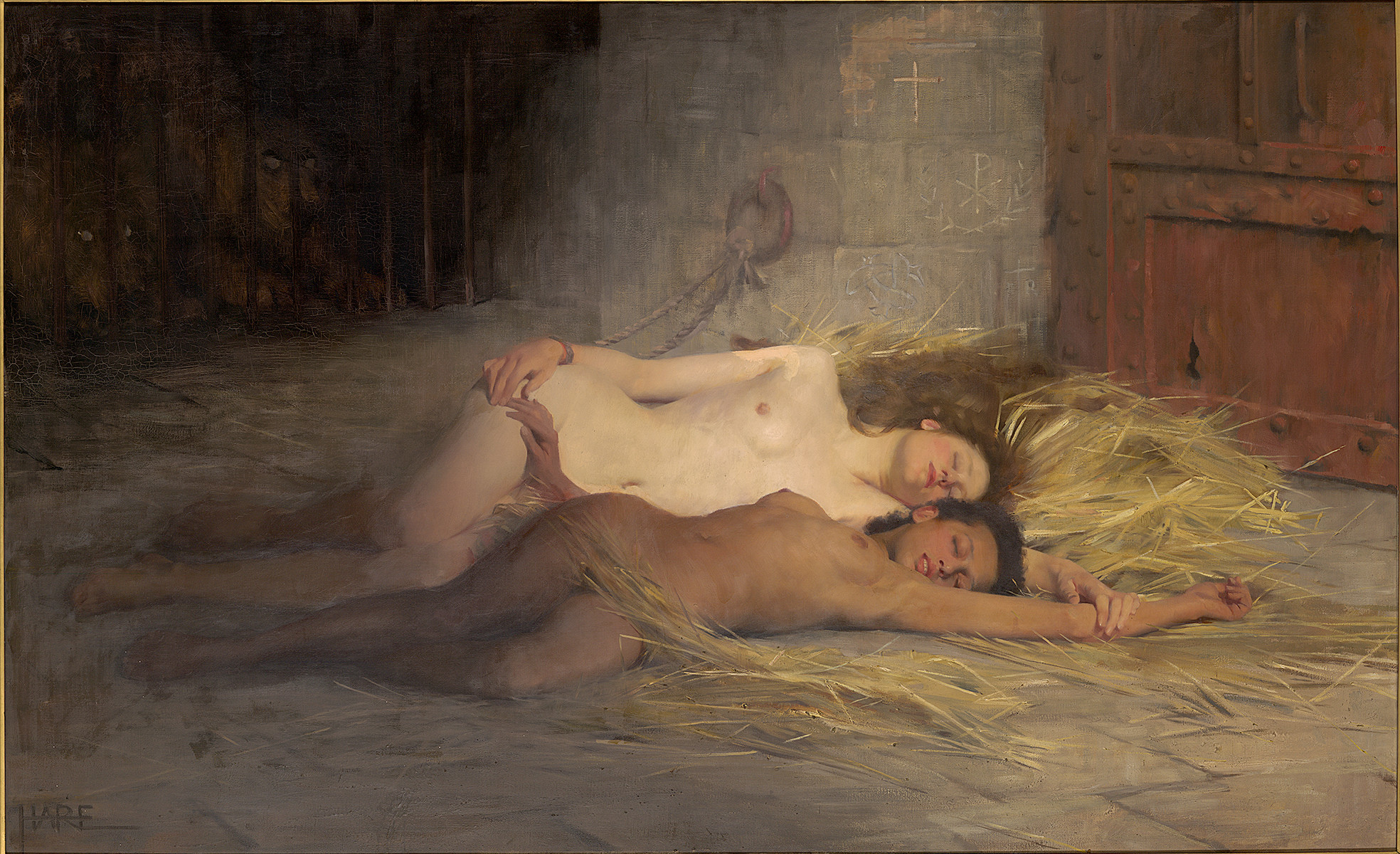
The Victory of Faith by Saint George Hare depicts two Roman Christians on the eve of their damnatio ad bestias. The painting has been described by Kobena Mercer as depicting an interracial lesbian couple, likening it to Les Amies by Jules Robert Auguste.

=== Myth of Iphis and Ianthe ===
In 8 CE, Book IX of Ovid's the Metamorphoses portrayed a lesbian love story between Iphis and Ianthe. When Iphis' mother becomes pregnant, her husband declares that he will kill the child if it is a girl. She bears a girl and conceals her sex by giving her a name that is of ambiguous gender: Iphis. When the "son" is thirteen, the father chooses a golden-haired maiden named Ianthe as the "boy's" bride. The love of the two girls is written sympathetically:

They were of equal age, they both were lovely,
Had learned the ABC from the same teachers,
And so love came to both of them together
In simple innocence, and filled their hearts
With equal longing.

As the marriage draws closer, Iphis recoils, calling her love "monstrous and unheard of", and fearing discovery. The gods hear the girl's moans and turn her into a man.

=== Roman Egyptian Love Spell ===
A lesbian "binding spell" from the Supplementum Magicum, from the 3rd or 4th century CE Roman Egypt, enchants a woman named Gorgonia to fall in love with a woman named Sophia. According to scholar Lucy Parr, the language used in this binding spell was common in heterosexual erotic spells.

Drive Gorgonia, daughter of Nilogenia, to torment and never let it rest: day and night, night and day, force her through the streets and through the houses in lust for Sophia, in love for her: let her submit like a slave, let her hand over all her possessions to Sophia, let the gods demand it!

== Gender presentation ==
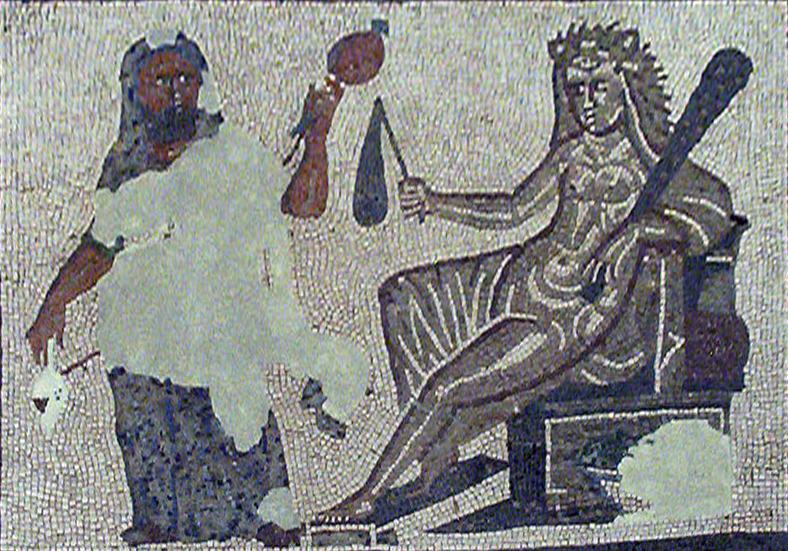
Hercules and Omphale cross-dressed (mosaic from Roman Spain, 3rd century AD)

Cross-dressing appears in Roman literature and art in various ways to mark the uncertainties and ambiguities of gender:

- as political invective, when a politician is accused of dressing seductively or effeminately;
- as a mythological trope, as in the story of Hercules and Omphale exchanging roles and attire;
- as a form of religious investiture, as for the priesthood of the Galli;
- and rarely or ambiguously as transvestic fetishism.

A section of the Digest by Ulpian categorizes Roman clothing on the basis of who may appropriately wear it: vestimenta virilia, "men's clothing", is defined as the attire of the paterfamilias, "head of household"; puerilia is clothing that serves no purpose other than to mark its wearer as a "child" or minor; muliebria are the garments that characterize a materfamilias; communia, those that are "common", that is, worn by either sex; and familiarica, clothing for the familia, the subordinates in a household, including the staff and slaves. A man who wore women's clothes, Ulpian notes, would risk making himself the object of scorn. Female prostitutes were the only women in ancient Rome who wore the distinctively masculine toga. The wearing of the toga may signal that prostitutes were outside the normal social and legal category of "woman".

A fragment from the playwright Accius (170–86 BC) seems to refer to a father who secretly wore "virgin's finery". An instance of transvestism is noted in a legal case, in which "a certain senator accustomed to wear women's evening clothes" was disposing of the garments in his will. In the "mock trial" exercise presented by the elder Seneca, the young man (adulescens) was gang-raped while wearing women's clothes in public, but his attire is explained as his acting on a dare by his friends, not as a choice based on gender identity or the pursuit of erotic pleasure.

Gender ambiguity was a characteristic of the priests of the goddess Cybele known as Galli, whose ritual attire included items of women's clothing. They are sometimes considered a transgender or transsexual priesthood, since they were required to be castrated in imitation of Attis. The complexities of gender identity in the religion of Cybele and the Attis myth are explored by Catullus in one of his longest poems, Carmen 63.

Macrobius describes a masculine form of Venus who had a dedicated cult on Cyprus; she had a beard and male genitals, but wore women's clothing. The deity's worshippers cross-dressed, men wearing women's clothes, and women men's. The Latin poet Laevius wrote of worshipping "nurturing Venus" whether female or male (sive femina sive mas). The figure was sometimes called Aphroditos. In several surviving examples of Greek and Roman sculpture, the love goddess pulls up her garments to reveal her male genitalia, a gesture that traditionally held apotropaic or magical power.

== Intersex ==
The Romans explored intersex identity through the myth of Hermaphroditus, from which derives the term "hermaphrodite". The myth relates how a beautiful youth on the cusp of adulthood is sexually assaulted by a nymph; their identities became fused into one. Hermaphroditus was a popular subject of Roman art as a subversion of binary gender roles, represented often in sculpture and wall painting. The biological reality of intersex persons was also observed. For example, Pliny the Elder notes that "there are even those who are born of both sexes, whom we call hermaphrodites, at one time androgyni" (andr-, "man", and gyn-, "woman", from the Greek), and Philostratus offers a historical account of a congenital "eunuch".

== Under Christian rule ==
Attitudes toward same-sex behavior changed as Christianity became more prominent in the Empire. The modern perception of Roman sexual decadence can be traced to early Christian polemic. Apart from measures to protect the liberty of citizens, the prosecution of male–male sex as a general crime began in the 3rd century when male prostitution was banned by Philip the Arab. A series of laws regulating male–male sex were promulgated during the social crisis of the 3rd century, from the statutory rape of minors to marriage between males.

By the end of the 4th century, anally passive men under the Christian Empire were punished by burning. "Death by sword" was the punishment for a "man coupling like a woman" under the Theodosian Code. It is in the 6th century, under Justinian, that legal and moral discourse on male–male sex becomes distinctly Abrahamic: all male–male sex, passive or active, no matter who the partners, was declared contrary to nature and punishable by death. Male–male sex was pointed to as cause for God's wrath following a series of disasters around 542 and 559.

== See also ==
- Catamite
- Erotic art in Pompeii and Herculaneum
- Greek love
- Kagema
- Homoeroticism
- History of erotic depictions
- History of homosexuality
- Homosexuality in ancient Greece
- Homosexuality in China
- Homosexuality in India
- Homosexuality in Japan
- Lex Scantinia, a poorly documented Roman law that regulated erotic affairs between freeborn men
- LGBT history in Italy
- Pederasty
- Pederasty in ancient Greece
- Sexuality in ancient Rome
- Societal attitudes toward homosexuality
- Spintria
- Wakashū

== Literature ==
- Boswell, John. Christianity, Social Tolerance, and Homosexuality. Chicago: University of Chicago Press, 1980. Esp. pp. 61–87.
- Clarke, John R. “Sexuality and Visual Representation.” In A Companion to Greek and Roman Sexualities, edited by Thomas K. Hubbard, 509–33. Malden, MA: Wiley-Blackwell, 2014.
- Gazzarri, Tommaso; Weiner, Jesse (2023). Searching for the cinaedus in ancient Rome. Leiden; Boston: Brill. ISBN 9789004548374.
- Hubbard, Thomas K., ed. Homosexuality in Greece and Rome: A Sourcebook of Basic Documents. Los Angeles, London: University of California Press, 2003. ISBN 0-520-23430-8
- Lelis, Arnold A., William A. Percy, and Beert C. Verstraete. The Age of Marriage in Ancient Rome. Lewiston, New York: Edwin Mellen Press, 2003.
- Skinner, Marilyn B. Sexuality in Greek and Roman Culture. 2nd edition. Malden, MA: Wiley-Blackwell, 2014.
- Williams, Craig. Roman Homosexuality: Ideologies of Masculinity in Classical Antiquity. New York: Oxford University Press, 1999.
- Williams, Craig. Roman Homosexuality. 2nd edition. New York: Oxford University Press, 2010.
