= Exoletus =

Latin term for a class of homosexual men

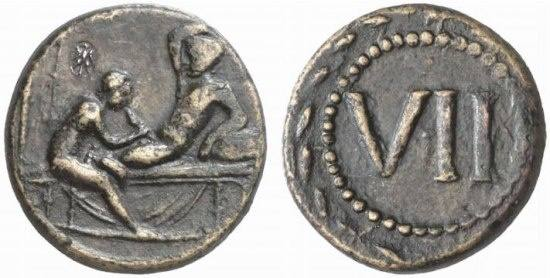
Oral sex between a youth and an older male on a Roman Spintria token

Exoletus is a Latin term, the perfect passive participle of the verb exolescere, which means "to wear out with age". In ancient Rome the word referred to a certain class of homosexual males or male prostitutes, although its precise meaning is unclear to historians.

In his essay on sexual morality, Offences Against One's Self, the nineteenth-century English philosopher Jeremy Bentham provided the following definition of the term:

There was a particular name for those who had past the short period beyond which no man hoped to be an object of desire to his own sex. They were called exoleti. No male therefore who was passed this short period of life could expect to find in this way any reciprocity of affection; he must be as odious to the boy from the beginning as in a short time the boy would be to him. The objects of this kind of sensuality would therefore come only in the place of common prostitutes; they could never even to a person of this depraved taste answer the purposes of a virtuous woman.

However, the word is sometimes also applied to adolescents, puberes exoleti, as in the Historia Augusta 7.5.4.4. In an essay on Roman erotic art, John Pollini has argued that the term referred not to age but to prostitutes who had become physically "worn out" by frequent anal penetration. John Boswell argued that the term "exoletus" distinguished an active from a passive male prostitute, or "catamitus", from which the English word "catamite" is derived. In the article "Some Myths and Anomalies in the Study of Roman Sexuality" in the Journal of Homosexuality, James L. Butrica argued that the term did not refer to prostitutes at all.

The word is found in Seneca's Epistulae 95.24, in Suetonius' Divus Iulius 76.3, and in Cicero's Pro Milone 55.8.

== See also ==
- Erotic art in Pompeii and Herculaneum
- Greek love
- History of erotic depictions
- History of human sexuality
- Homosexuality in ancient Rome
- Homosexuality in ancient Greece
- LGBTQ slang
- Pederasty
- Pederasty in ancient Greece
- Prostitution in ancient Rome
- Sexuality in ancient Rome
