= Trial of Trebonius =

The Trial of Trebonius refers to the military trial of the Roman soldier Trebonius for killing Gaius Lusius, his superior officer and nephew of the Roman general and Consul, Gaius Marius. The trial served to show Marius’s impartiality when dealing out justice that made him popular among his soldiers as well as the common Roman citizens. Valerius Maximus calls Trebonius, Gaius Plotius. Because Plutarch says that this event contributed to Marius' third election as consul, the trial most likely took place in 104 BC.

== Setting ==
Gaius Lusius was the son of the sister of Gaius Marius, and had been given the position of a commissioned officer during the Cimbrian War between Rome and the Proto-Germanic tribe of the Cimbri. Plutarch describes Lusius as a man who had sexual feelings for a young soldier under his command, but was not generally a bad man. Cicero describes the Trial of Trebonius (although not by name) and describes Trebonius as "the virtuous youth". Valerius Maximus and Cicero both say that Lusius was a military tribune. The so-called Marian reforms to the military had lessened the power and number of military tribunes. Despite this, he attempted to use his position to seduce Trebonius, who had so far not cooperated with his advances. Lusius summoned Trebonius to his tent and attempted to rape the young soldier. Trebonius had no choice but to go to the tent, because he could not disobey the summons of his commander. Inside the tent, Trebonius killed Lusius with his sword.

== Trial ==
Gaius Lusius’s uncle, Gaius Marius, returned and had Trebonius brought to trial. Plutarch describes there being many accusers against Trebonius, but no one to defend him. Cicero and Maximus both claim that Lusius's position as a tribune could account for this, in that he would have probably held political power during life, and others may have been afraid of a similar fate if Trebonius was not suitably punished. Trebonius took up his own cause and defended himself before the trial. He provided examples of Lusius’s unceremonious behavior, and offered up witnesses to testify about Lusius’s acts. Lusius had often made generous offers towards Trebonius and had often made advances on him, but Trebonius had never given into his seductions.

Marius was impressed with both the courage of Trebonius’s self defence at his trial, as well as his unwavering affirmation of Lusius’s attempts to seduce and bribe him. He ordered the laurel which symbolized the prize for valour to be placed on the head of Trebonius. Marius declared Trebonius’s deeds as noble and that he was an example to show other Romans how to behave. Both Cicero and Valerius Maximus agree that it was Gaius Lusius’s advances towards Trebonius that led to his death. The prize for valour was a physical symbol showing that Trebonius should be respected and heralded for his incorruptibility and his determination. That Marius "took it and with his own hands placed it on Trebonius's head" shows his desire to be associated with such qualities.

== Implications ==
The news of the outcome of the trial spread quickly, and helped Marius gain popularity and helped him achieve his third consulship of Rome.

For some, the results of the trial showed that Marius was a man who would reward noble deeds and was against immorality. The trial showed that Marius would not show favouritism towards even members of his own family if he believed them to be in the wrong. The trial was shown by several Roman authors to be an example of justice and that Trebonius should be held up as a moral example, influencing other Romans to take up his example and perform noble deeds. Although Trebonius was not of the nobility, as he was just a common soldier in an uncommon situation, it illustrated the ideal that all Roman citizens were expected to behave in a noble manner.

The trial is cited by Cicero in his defence of Milo for the killing of Clodius. Cicero uses it as an example in Roman history of a situation when it is acceptable to use violence, arguing that it is a time “when violence is offered, and can only be repelled by violence”. The decision also says something about the thoughts on men soliciting others for sexual favours. Valerius Maximus gives the main cause of Gaius Lusius’s death not because he attempted to use his power over the common soldier for his own personal gain, but because “the reason was that Lusius had dared to approach Plotius (Trebonius) for sexual favours.”
