= Catamite =

Pubescent male companion in a pederastic relationship in ancient Greece and Rome

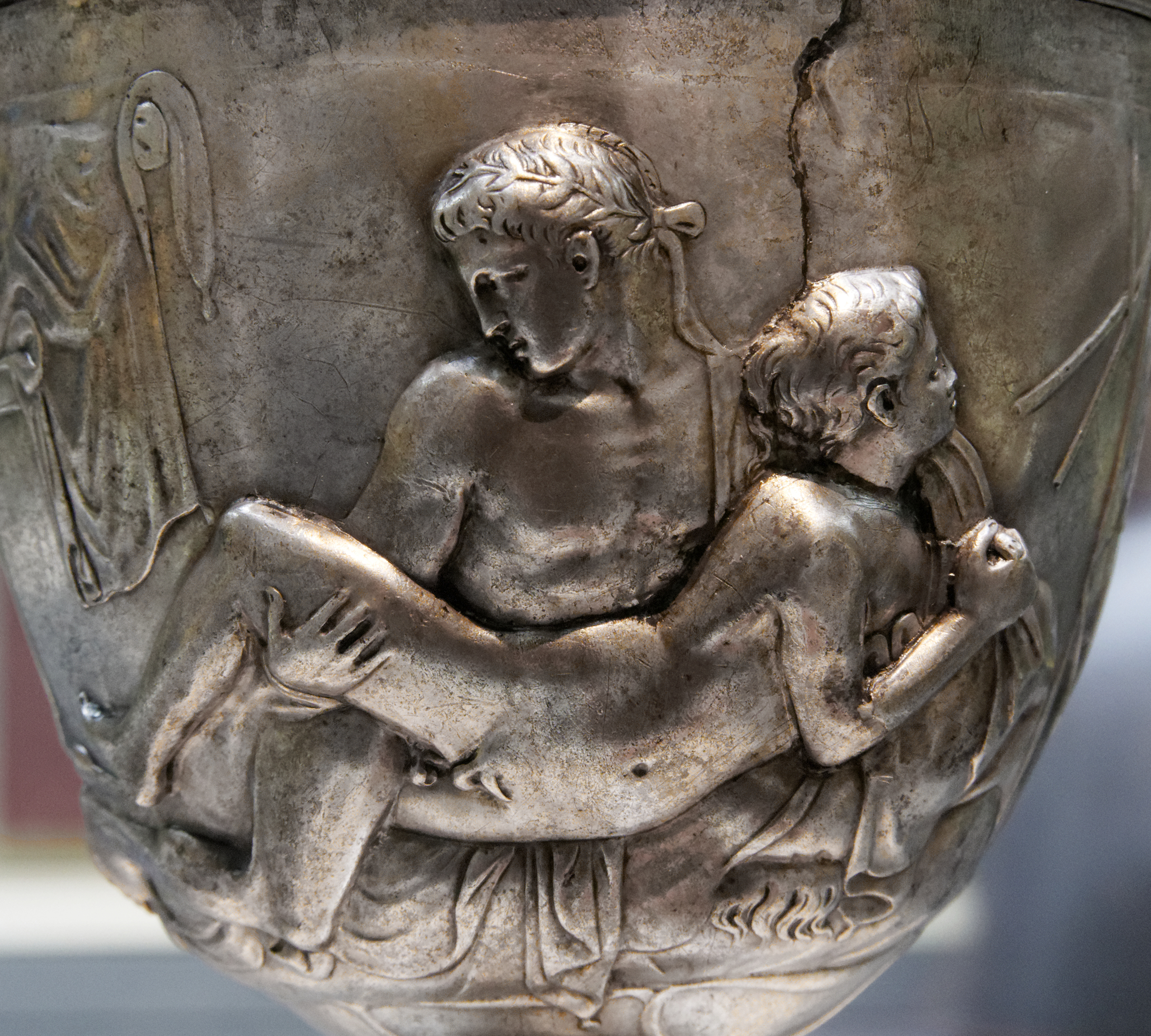
The Warren Cup, now in the British Museum, depicts sexual intimacy between a young man or a "pederast" – in the broadest sense – and his "catamite"

In ancient Greece and Rome, a catamite (Latin: catamītus) was a pubescent boy who was the intimate companion of an older male, usually in a pederastic relationship. It was generally a term of affection and literally means "Ganymede" in Latin, but it was also used as a term of insult when directed toward a grown man. The word derives from the proper noun Catamitus, the Latinized form of Ganymede, the name of the beautiful Trojan youth abducted by Zeus to be his companion and cupbearer, according to Greek mythology. The Etruscan form of the name was Catmite, from an alternative Greek form of the name, Gadymedes.

In its modern usage, the term catamite refers to a boy as the passive or receiving partner in anal intercourse with a man.

== References in literature and popular culture ==
- The word appears widely but not necessarily frequently in the Latin literature of antiquity, from Plautus to Ausonius. It is sometimes a synonym for puer delicatus, 'delicate boy'. Cicero uses the term as an insult. The word became a general term for a boy groomed for sexual purposes. It also appears in Meditations by Marcus Aurelius (Books 3.16, 5.10 and 6.34).
- Stephen Dedalus ponders the word in Ulysses when discussing accusations that William Shakespeare might have been a pederast.
- C. S. Lewis in his partial autobiography Surprised by Joy described the social roles during his time at Wyvern College (by which he meant Malvern College) as including the role of "Tart": "a pretty and effeminate-looking small boy who acts as a catamite to one or more of his seniors ..." and noted that "pederasty ... was not [frowned upon as seriously as] wearing one's coat unbuttoned."
- In René Belbenoît's 1938 memoir Dry Guillotine, Fifteen Years Among The Living Dead, which describes his time as a French prisoner on Devil's Island, early chapters describe how older, stronger prisoners would violently take young men and teenagers as their môme (boy-pet).
- Anthony Burgess's 1980 novel Earthly Powers uses the word in its opening sentence: "It was the afternoon of my eighty-first birthday, and I was in bed with my catamite when Ali announced that the archbishop had come to see me."
- In HBO's TV series Rome, following the battle of Pharsalus, Julius Caesar admonishes Lucius Vorenus for letting Pompey Magnus escape, saying that Pompey might be "broken like a Dacian catamite" and yet still be dangerous.
- In the post-apocalyptic landscape of Cormac McCarthy's novel The Road, the narrator describes an army on the move on foot with "women, perhaps a dozen in number, some of them pregnant, and lastly a supplementary consort of catamites".
- In South Park season 7 episode 8, "South Park Is Gay!", Craig Tucker identifies himself as a catamite.
- In Forbidden Colors by Yukio Mishima the term is used by an older man addressing a significantly younger one. He compares “the worship of the Virgin Mary in European medievalism” to the: “(…) worship of the catamite.

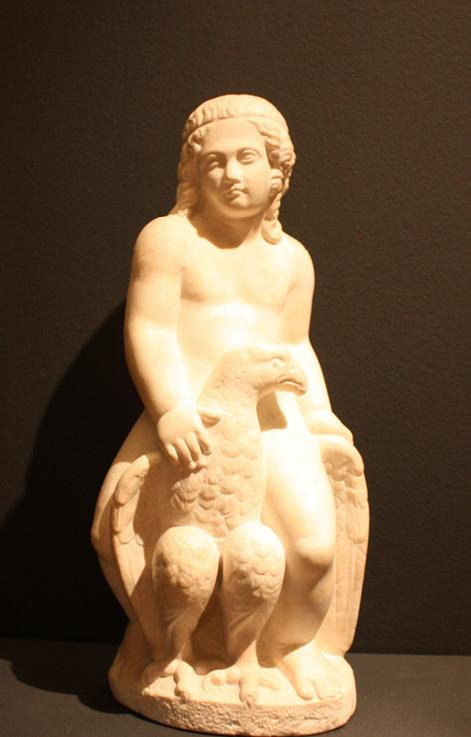
Roman Ganymede as a puer delicatus, with the eagle of Jove

== See also ==
- Greek love
- Sexuality in ancient Rome
