= Concubinage =

State of living together as spouses while unmarried

Concubinage is an interpersonal and sexual relationship between two people in which the couple does not want to, or cannot, enter into a full marriage. Concubinage and marriage are often regarded as similar, but mutually exclusive.

In China, until the 20th century, concubinage was a formal and institutionalized practice that upheld concubines' rights and obligations. A concubine could be freeborn or of slave origin, and her experience could vary tremendously according to her master's whim. During the Mongol conquests, both foreign royals and captured women were taken as concubines. Concubinage was also common in Meiji Japan as a status symbol.

Ancient Near Eastern societies used concubinage for reproduction. The practice of a barren wife giving her husband a slave as a concubine is recorded in the Code of Hammurabi. The children of such relationships would be regarded as legitimate. Such concubinage was also widely practiced in the Muslim world until the abolition of slavery in the mid 20th century, and many rulers of the Abbasid Caliphate and the Ottoman Empire were born of such relationships. Throughout Africa, from Egypt to South Africa, slave concubinage resulted in racially mixed populations. The practice declined as a result of the abolition of slavery.

In ancient Rome, the practice of concubinatus was a monogamous relationship that served as an alternative to marriage, often because of the woman's lower social status. Widowed or divorced men often took a concubina, the Latin term from which the English "concubine" is derived, rather than remarrying, so as to avoid complications of inheritance. After the Christianization of the Roman Empire, Christian emperors improved the status of concubines by granting them and their children the sorts of property and inheritance rights usually reserved for wives.

In European colonies and American slave plantations, single and married men entered into long-term sexual relationships with local and enslaved women. In the Dutch East Indies, concubinage between Dutch men and local women created the mixed-race Eurasian Indo community. In India, Anglo-Indians were a result of marriages and concubinage between European men and Indian women.

In the Judeo-Christian-Islamic world, the term concubine has almost exclusively been applied to women, although a cohabiting male may also be called a concubine. In the 21st century, concubinage is used in some Western countries as a gender-neutral legal term to refer to cohabitation (including cohabitation between same-sex partners).

== Etymology and usage ==
The English terms "concubine" and "concubinage" appeared in the 14th century, deriving from Latin terms in Roman society and law. The term concubine (c. 1300), meaning "a paramour, a woman who cohabits with a man without being married to him", comes from the Latin concubina (f.) and concubinus (m.), terms that in Roman law meant "one who lives unmarried with a married man or woman". The Latin terms are derived from the verb from concumbere "to lie with, to lie together, to cohabit," an assimilation of "com", a prefix meaning "with, together" and "cubare", meaning "to lie down". Concubine is a term used widely in historical and academic literature, and which varies considerably depending on the context. In the twenty-first century, it typically refers explicitly to extramarital affection, "either to a mistress or to a sex slave", without the same emphasis on the cohabiting aspect of the original meaning.

Concubinage emerged as an English term in the late 14th century to mean the "state of being a concubine; act or practice of cohabiting in intimacy without legal marriage", and was derived from Latin by means of Old French, where the term may in turn have been derived from the Latin concubinatus, an institution in ancient Rome that meant "a permanent cohabitation between persons to whose marriage there were no legal obstacles". It has also been described more plainly as a long-term sexual relationship between a man and a woman who are not legally married. In pre-modern to modern law, concubinage has been used in certain jurisdictions to describe cohabitation, and in France, was formalized in 1999 as the French equivalent of a civil union. (Note: Article 515-8 of the Civil Code defines "concubinage" as "a de facto union, characterized by a shared life and a character of stability and continuity, between two persons of different or same sex, who live as a couple" ("une union de fait, caractérisée par une vie commune présentant un caractère de stabilité et de continuité, entre deux personnes, de sexe différent ou de même sexe, qui vivent en couple"). See also Concubinage en France (in French).) The US legal system also used to use the term in reference to cohabitation, but the term never evolved further and is now considered outdated. In Switzerland, the term is still used as of 2025 for a legal status of cohabitation without marriage.

== Characteristics ==
Forms of concubinage have existed in all cultures, though the prevalence of the practice and the rights and expectations of the persons involved have varied considerably, as have the rights of the offspring born from such relationships, a concubine's legal and social status, their role within a household and society's perceptions of the institution.

A relationship of concubinage could take place voluntarily, with the parties involved agreeing not to enter into marriage, or involuntarily (i.e. through slavery). In slave-owning societies, most concubines were slaves, also called "slave-concubines". This institutionalization of concubinage with female slaves dates back to Babylonian times, and has been practiced in patriarchal cultures throughout history.

Whatever the status and rights of the persons involved, they were typically inferior for a concubine than those of a legitimate spouse, often with the rights of inheritance being limited or excluded.

Concubinage and marriage are often regarded as similar but mutually exclusive. In the past, a couple may not have been able to marry because of differences in social class, ethnicity or religion, or a man might want to avoid the legal and financial complications of marriage. Practical impediments or social disincentives for a couple to marry could include differences in social rank status, an existing marriage and laws against bigamy, religious or professional prohibitions, or a lack of recognition by the appropriate authorities.

The concubine in a concubinage tended to have a lower social status than the married party or home owner, and this was often the reason why concubinage was preferred to marriage. A concubine could be an "alien" in a society that did not recognize marriages between foreigners and citizens. Alternatively, they might be a slave, or person from a poor family interested in a union with a man from the nobility. In other cases, some social groups were forbidden to marry, such as Roman soldiers, and concubinage served as a viable alternative to marriage.

In polygynous situations, the number of concubines that were permitted within an individual concubinage arrangement has varied greatly. In Roman law, where monogamy was expected, the relationship was identical (and alternative) to marriage except for the lack of marital affection from both or one of the parties, which conferred rights related to property, inheritance and social rank. By contrast, in parts of Asia and the Middle East, powerful men kept as many concubines as they could financially support. Some royal households had thousands of concubines. In such cases concubinage served as a status symbol and for the production of sons.

In societies that accepted polygyny, there were advantages to having a concubine over a mistress, as children from a concubine were legitimate, while children from a mistress would be considered "bastards".

== Categorization ==
Scholars have made attempts to categorize patterns of concubinage practiced in the world.

The International Encyclopedia of Anthropology gives four distinct forms of concubinage:

- Royal concubinage, where politics was connected to reproduction. Concubines became consorts to the ruler, fostered diplomatic relations, and perpetuated the royal bloodline. Imperial concubines could be selected from the general population or prisoners of war. Examples of this included imperial China, the Ottoman Empire and the Sultanate of Kano.
- Elite concubinage, which offered men the chance to increase social status and satisfy desires. Most such men already had wives. In East Asia this practice was justified by Confucianism. In the Muslim world, concubines were slaves.
- Concubinage could be a form of common-law relationship that allowed a couple who did not wish to marry to live together. This was prevalent in medieval Europe and colonial Asia. In Europe, some families discouraged younger sons from marriage to prevent division of family wealth among many heirs.
- Concubinage could also function as a form of sexual enslavement of women in a patriarchal system. In such cases the children of the concubine could become permanently inferior to the children of the wife. Examples include Mughal India and Joseon Korea.

Junius P. Rodriguez gives three cultural patterns of concubinage: Asian, Islamic and European.

== Antiquity ==
=== Mesopotamia ===
In Mesopotamia, it was customary for a sterile wife to give her husband a slave as a concubine to bear children. The status of such concubines was ambiguous; they normally could not be sold but they remained the slave of the wife. However, in the late Babylonian period, there are reports that concubines could be sold.

Old Assyrian Period (20th–18th centuries BC)

In general, marriage was monogamous. (Note: During the Old Assyrian Period, Assyrian marriages were generally monogamous. But if a merchant had two homes, one in Anatolia and another in Assyria, he was allowed to have a wife in each city.) "If after two or three years of marriage the wife had not given birth to any children, the husband was allowed to buy a slave (who could also be chosen by the wife) in order to produce heirs. This woman, however, remained a slave and never gained the status of a second wife."

Middle Assyrian Period (14th–11th centuries BC)

In the Middle Assyrian Period, the main wife (assatu) wore a veil in the street, as could a concubine (esirtu) if she were accompanying the main wife, or if she were married. "If a man veils his concubine in public, by declaring 'she is my wife,' this woman shall be his wife." It was illegal for unmarried women, prostitutes and slave women to wear a veil in the street. "The children of a concubine were lower in rank than the descendants of a wife, but they could inherit if the marriage of the latter remained childless."

=== Ancient Egypt ===
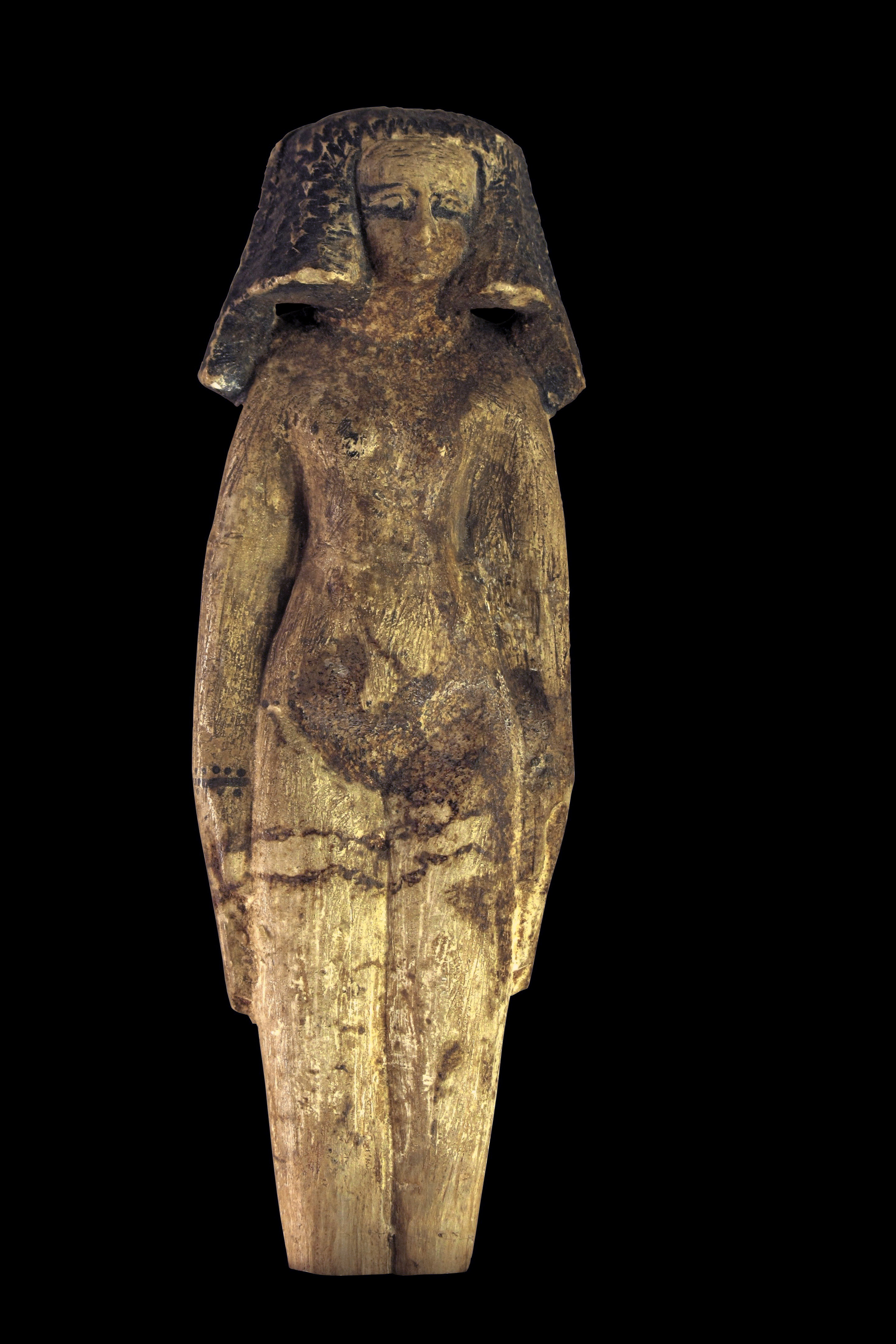
Ushabti of a concubine, naked with jewelry underlying the breasts, pubis shaved with visible vulva, and wearing a heavy wig with erotic implications (painted wood, 2050–1710 BC)

While most Ancient Egyptians were monogamous, a male pharaoh would have had other, lesser wives and concubines in addition to the Great Royal Wife. This arrangement would allow the pharaoh to enter into diplomatic marriages with the daughters of allies, as was the custom of ancient kings. Concubinage was a common occupation for women in ancient Egypt, especially for talented women. A request for forty concubines by Amenhotep III (c. 1386–1353 BC) to a man named Milkilu, Prince of Gezer states:

"Behold, I have sent you Hanya, the commissioner of the archers, with merchandise in order to have beautiful concubines, i.e. weavers. Silver, gold, garments, all sort of precious stones, chairs of ebony, as well as all good things, worth 160 deben. In total: forty concubines—the price of every concubine is forty of silver. Therefore, send very beautiful concubines without blemish." – (Lewis, 146)

Concubines would be kept in the pharaoh's harem. Amenhotep III kept his concubines in his palace at Malkata, which was one of the most opulent in the history of Egypt. The king was considered to be deserving of many women as long as he cared for his Great Royal Wife as well.

=== Ancient Greece ===
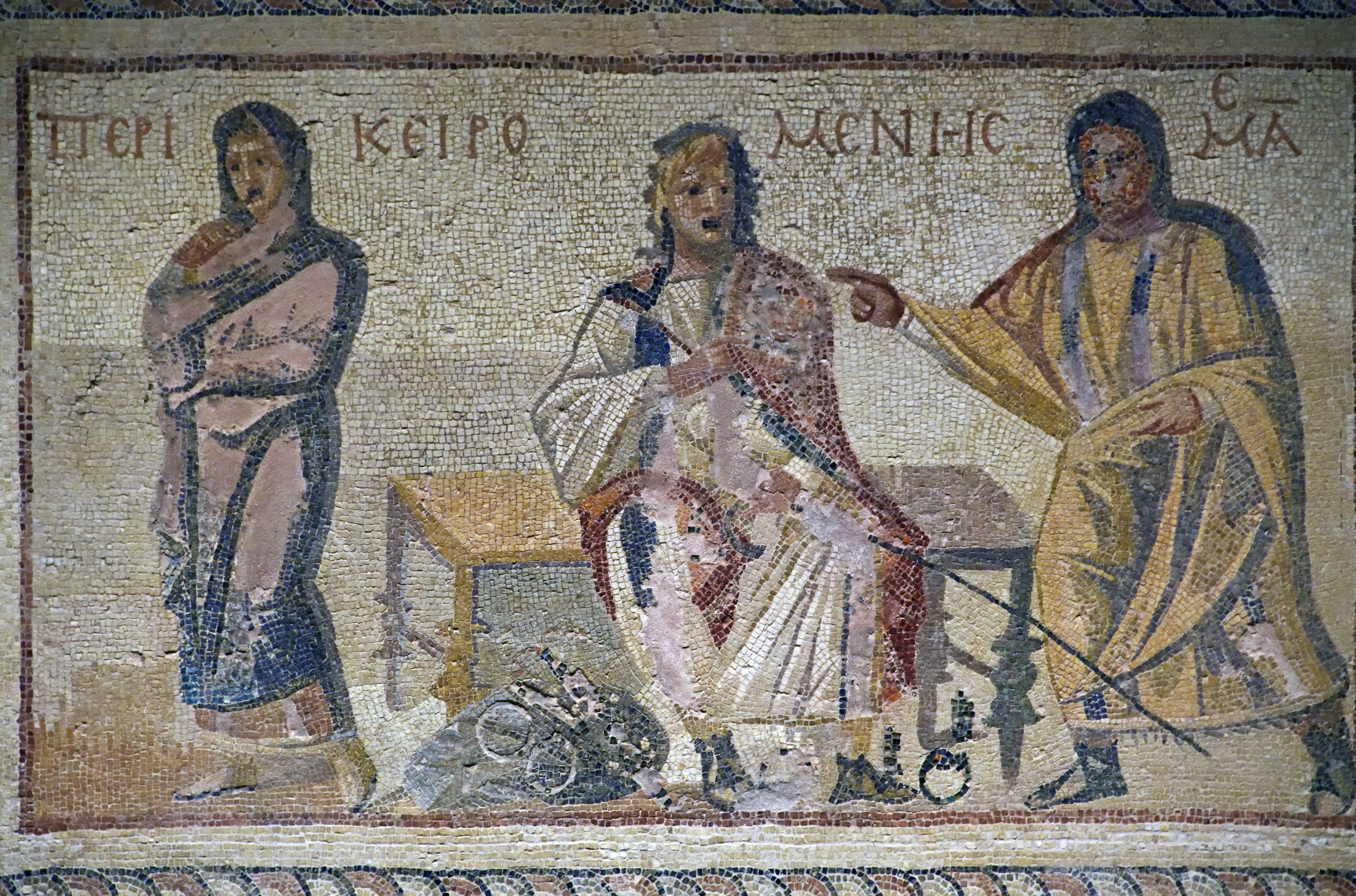
Mosaic (3rd century AD) depicting Glykera (left), the pallake of Polemon (center), and a household slave named Sosias (right) in a scene from the play Perikeiromene by Menander, first performed around 313 BC

In Ancient Greece, the practice of keeping a concubine (Ancient Greek: παλλακίς pallakís) was common among the upper classes, and they were for the most part women who were slaves or foreigners, but occasional free born based on family arrangements (typically from poor families). Children produced by slaves remained slaves and those by non-slave concubines varied over time; sometimes they had the possibility of citizenship. The law prescribed that a man could kill another man caught attempting a relationship with his concubine.

By the mid fourth century, concubines could inherit property, but, like wives, they were treated as sexual property. While references to the sexual exploitation of maidservants appear in literature, it was considered disgraceful for a man to keep such women under the same roof as his wife. Apollodorus of Acharnae said that hetaera were concubines when they had a permanent relationship with a single man, but nonetheless used the two terms interchangeably.

=== Ancient Rome ===
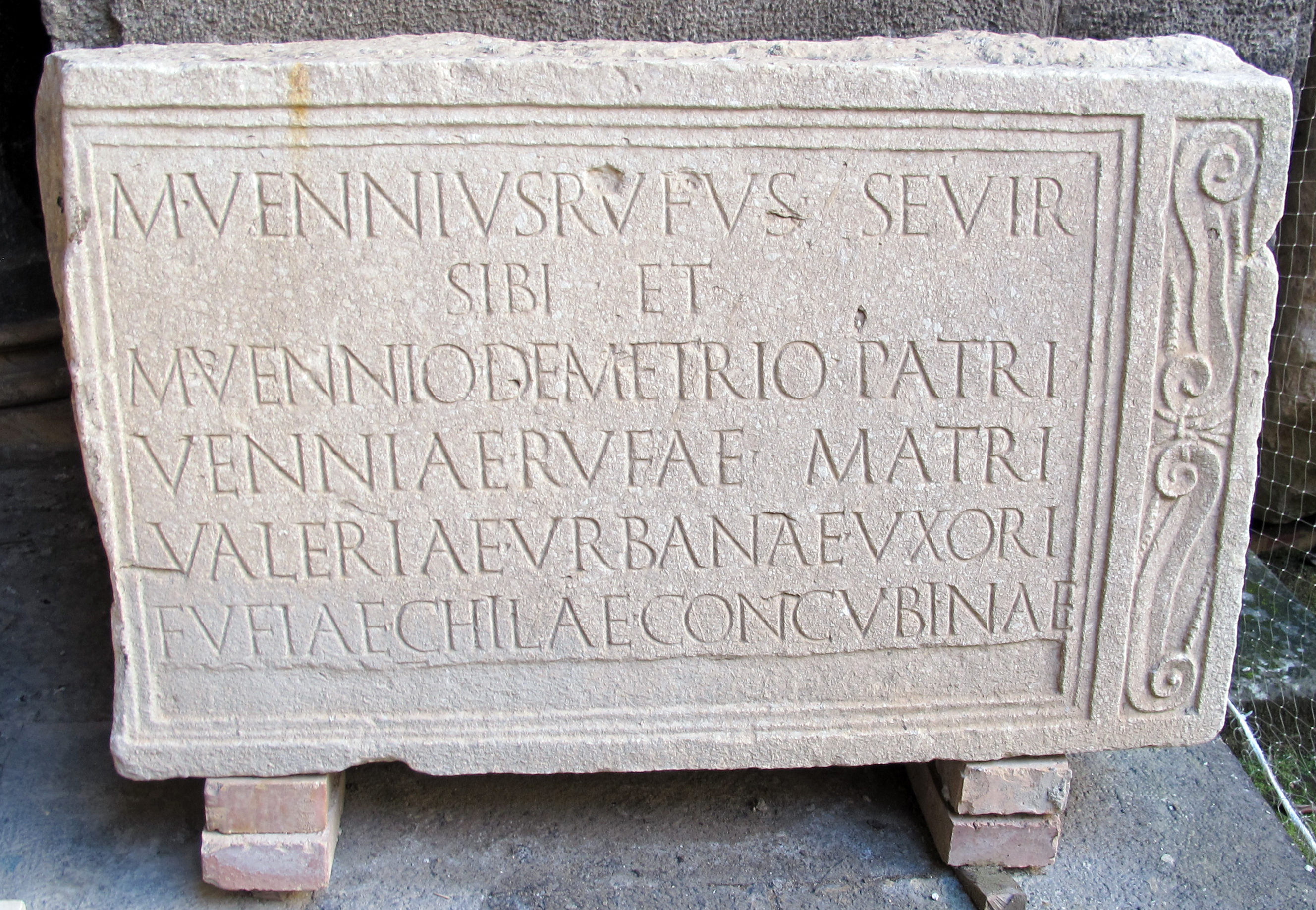
The concubina Fufia Chila is included in this family gravestone set up by Marcus Vennius Rufus to commemorate himself, his father and mother, and his late wife (CIL IX 2265)

Concubinatus was a monogamous union recognized socially and to some extent legally as an alternative to marriage in the Roman Empire. Concubinage was practiced most often in couples when one partner, almost always the man, belonged to a higher social rank, especially the senatorial order, who were penalized for marrying below their class. The female partner was a concubina; the term concubinus is used of men mainly in a same-sex union or to deprecate a relationship in which the woman was dominant.

The use of the term concubina in epitaphs for family memorials indicates that the role was socially acceptable. A man was not allowed to have both a concubina and a wife (uxor) at the same time, but a single tombstone might list multiple wives or concubinae serially. By contrast, the pejorative paelex referred to a concubine who was a sexual rival to a wife—in early Rome, most often a war captive and hence unwillingly—and by late antiquity was loosely equivalent to "prostitute". However, in Latin literature concubinae are often disparaged as slaves kept as sexual luxuries in the literal sense of "bedmate". The distinction is that the use of an enslaved woman was not concubinatus in the legal sense, which might involve a signed document, though even an informal concubine had some legal protections that placed her among the more privileged slaves of the household.

Concubines occupied an entire chapter, now fragmentary, in the 6th-century compilation of Roman law known as the Digest, but concubinatus was never a fully realized legal institution. It evolved in ad hoc response to Augustan moral legislation that criminalized some forms of adultery and other consensual sexual behaviors among freeborn people (ingenui) outside marriage. Even Roman legal experts had trouble parsing the various forms of marriage, the status of a concubina, and whether an extramarital sexual relationship was adultery or permissible pleasure-seeking with a prostitute, professional entertainer, or slave.

Roman emperors not infrequently took a concubina, often a freedwoman, rather than remarrying after the death of their wife to avoid the legal complications pertaining to succession and inheritance. Caenis, the freedwoman and secretary of Antonia Minor, was Vespasian's wife "in all but name", according to Suetonius, until her death in AD 74. Roman manumission law also allowed a slave-owner to free the slave and enter into concubinatus or a regular marriage. Epitaphs indicate that both partners in concubinatus might also be freedpersons, for reasons that are not entirely clear.

A slave lacked the legal personhood to marry under Roman law or to contract concubinatus, but the heterosexual union of two slaves, or a freedperson and a slave, might be recognized as an intention to marry when both partners gained the legal status that permitted them to do so. In this quasi-marital union, called contubernium, children seem often to have been desired, in contrast to concubinatus, in which children more often were viewed as complications and there was no intention to marry.

== East and South Asia ==
Concubinage was highly popular before the early 20th century all over East Asia. The main functions of concubinage for men was for pleasure and producing additional heirs, whereas for women the relationship could provide financial security. Children of concubines had lower rights in account to inheritance, which was regulated by the Dishu system.

In China and the Muslim world, the concubine of a monarch could achieve power, especially if her son also became a monarch.

=== China ===
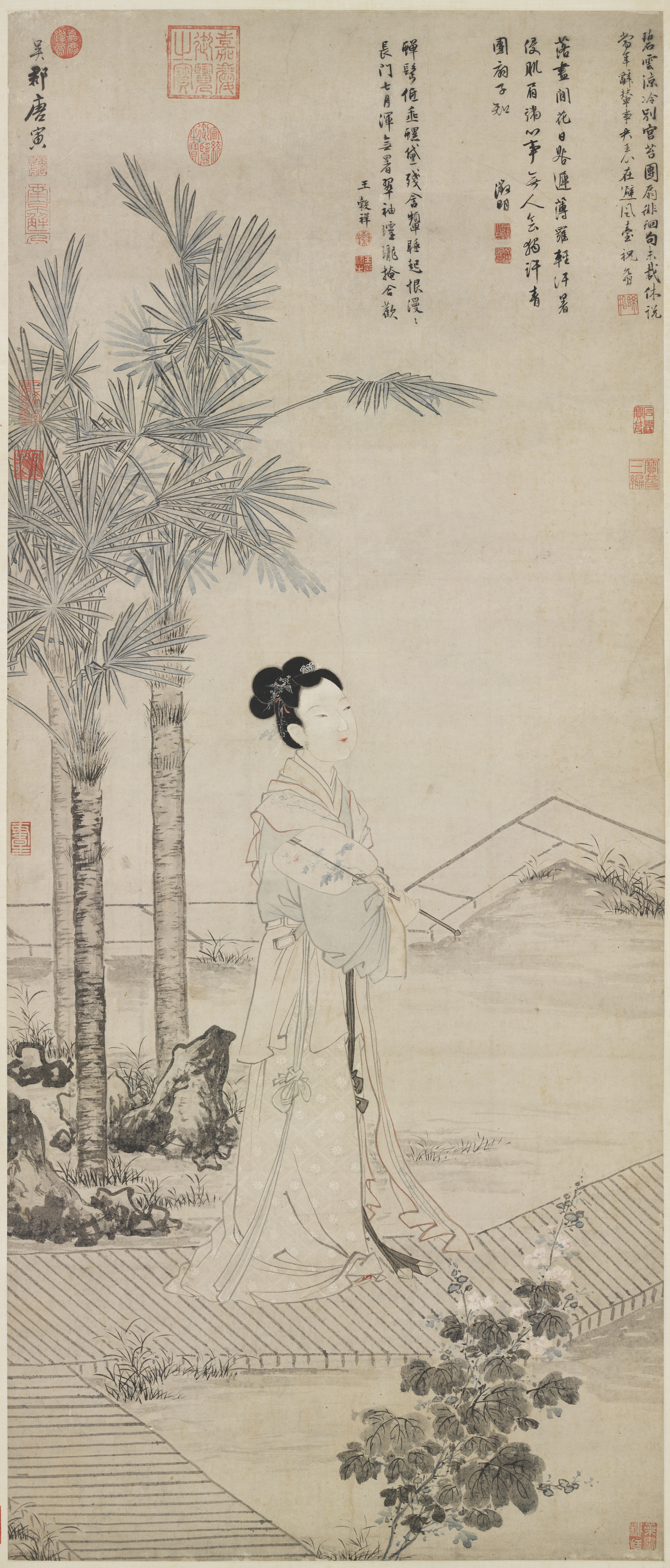
16th-century painting of Ban Jieyu (c. 48 BC – c. 2 BC), poet and concubine to Emperor Cheng of the Han dynasty.

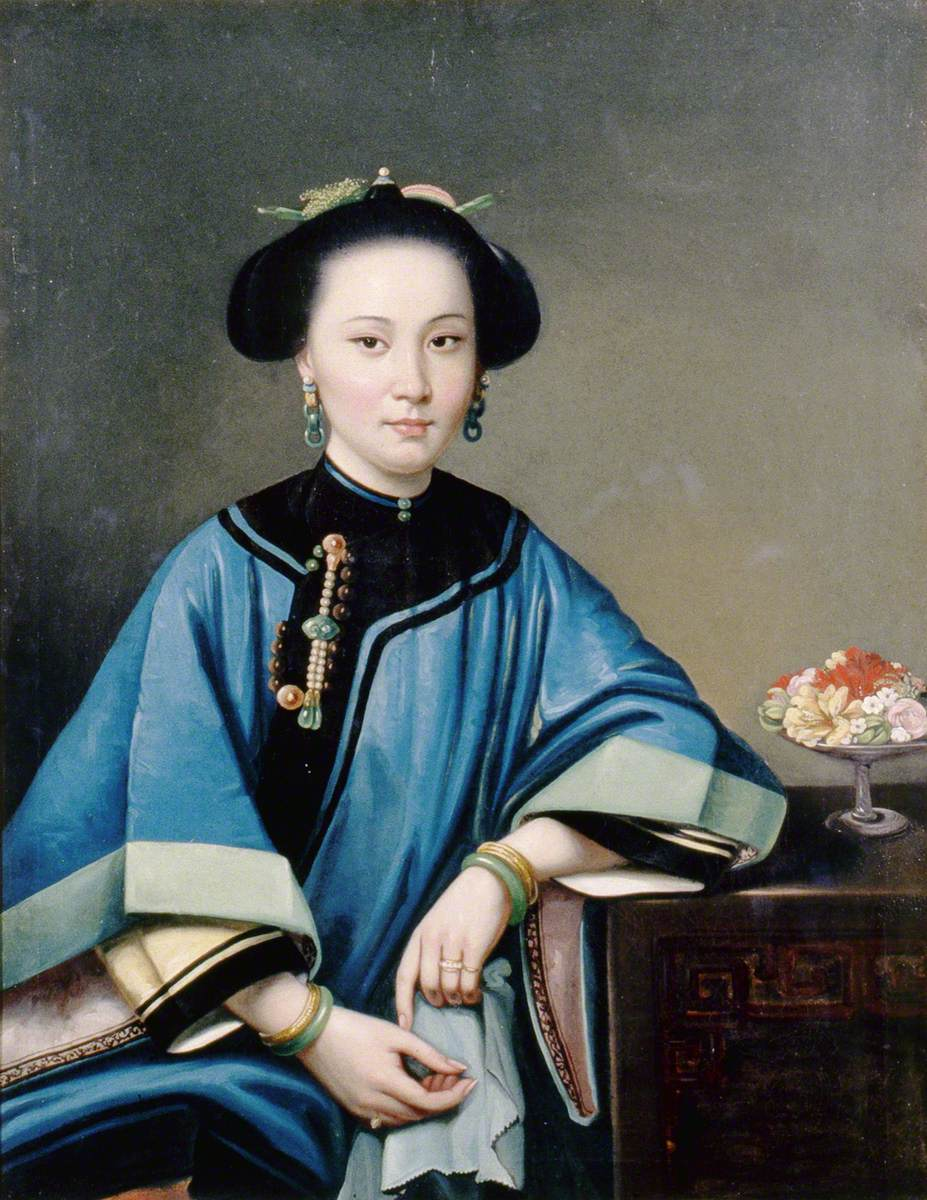
Portrait of a concubine, by Chinese painter Lam Qua, 1864

In China, upper-class men often had concubines until the practice was outlawed when the Chinese Communist Party came to power in 1949. The standard Chinese term translated as "concubine" was qiè 妾, a term that has been used since ancient times. Concubinage resembled marriage in that concubines were recognized sexual partners of a man and were expected to bear children for him. Unofficial concubines (Chinese: 婢妾; pinyin: bì qiè) were of lower status, and their children were considered illegitimate. The English term concubine is also used for what the Chinese refer to as pínfēi (Chinese: 嬪妃), or "consorts of emperors", an official position often carrying a very high rank.

In premodern China it was illegal and socially disreputable for a man to have more than one wife at a time, but it was acceptable to have concubines. From the earliest times wealthy men purchased concubines and added them to their household in addition to their wife. The purchase of concubines was similar to the purchase of slaves, but concubines had a higher social status.

In the earliest records a man could have as many concubines as he could afford to purchase. From the Eastern Han period (AD 25–220) onward, the number of concubines a man could have was limited by law. The higher rank and the more noble identity a man possessed, the more concubines he was permitted to have. A concubine's treatment and situation was variable and was influenced by the social status of the male to whom she was attached, as well as the attitude of his wife. In the Book of Rites chapter on "The Pattern of the Family" (Chinese: 內則) it says, "If there were betrothal rites, she became a wife; and if she went without these, a concubine." Wives brought a dowry to a relationship, but concubines did not. A concubinage relationship could be entered into without the ceremonies used in marriages, and neither remarriage nor a return to her natal home in widowhood were allowed to a concubine. There are early records of concubines allegedly being buried alive with their masters to "keep them company in the afterlife".

Women in concubinage (妾) were treated as inferior, and expected to be subservient to any wife under traditional Chinese marriage (if there was one). The position of the concubine was generally inferior to that of the wife. Although a concubine could produce heirs, her children would be inferior in social status to a wife's children, although they were of higher status than illegitimate children. The child of a concubine had to show filial duty to two women, their biological mother and their legal mother—the wife of their father. After the death of a concubine, her sons would make an offering to her, but these offerings were not continued by the concubine's grandsons, who only made offerings to their grandfather's wife.

Until the Song dynasty (960–1276), it was considered a serious breach of social ethics to promote a concubine to a wife. During the Qing dynasty (1644–1911), the status of concubines improved. It became permissible to promote a concubine to wife, if the original wife had died and the concubine was the mother of the only surviving sons. Moreover, the prohibition against forcing a widow to remarry was extended to widowed concubines. During this period tablets for concubine-mothers seem to have been more commonly placed in family ancestral altars, and genealogies of some lineages listed concubine-mothers. Many of the concubines of the emperor of the Qing dynasty were freeborn women from prominent families. Concubines of men of lower social status could be either freeborn or slave.

Imperial concubines, kept by emperors in the Forbidden City, had different ranks and were traditionally guarded by eunuchs to ensure that they could not be impregnated by anyone but the emperor. In Ming China (1368–1644) there was an official system to select concubines for the emperor. The age of the candidates ranged mainly from 14 to 16. Virtues, behavior, character, appearance and body condition were the selection criteria.

Despite the limitations imposed on Chinese concubines, there are several examples in history and literature of concubines who achieved great power and influence. Lady Yehenara, otherwise known as Empress Dowager Cixi, was one of the most successful concubines in Chinese history. Cixi first entered the court as a concubine to Xianfeng Emperor and gave birth to his only surviving son, who later became Tongzhi Emperor. She eventually became the de facto ruler of Qing China for 47 years after her husband's death.

An examination of concubinage features in one of the Four Great Classical Novels, Dream of the Red Chamber (believed to be a semi-autobiographical account of author Cao Xueqin's family life). Three generations of the Jia family are supported by one notable concubine of the emperor, Jia Yuanchun, the full elder sister of the male protagonist Jia Baoyu. In contrast, their younger half-siblings by concubine Zhao, Jia Tanchun and Jia Huan, develop distorted personalities because they are the children of a concubine.

Emperors' concubines and harems are emphasized in 21st-century romantic novels written for female readers and set in ancient times. As a plot element, the children of concubines are depicted with a status much inferior to that in actual history. The zhai dou (Chinese: 宅斗，residential intrigue) and gong dou (Chinese: 宫斗，harem intrigue) genres show concubines and wives, as well as their children, scheming secretly to gain power. Empresses in the Palace, a gong dou type novel and TV drama, has had great success in 21st-century China.

Hong Kong officially abolished the Great Qing Legal Code in 1971, thereby making concubinage illegal. Casino magnate Stanley Ho of Macau took his "second wife" as his official concubine in 1957, while his "third and fourth wives" retain no official status.

=== Mongols ===
Polygyny and concubinage were very common in Mongol society, especially for powerful Mongol men. Genghis Khan, Ögedei Khan, Jochi, Tolui, and Kublai Khan (among others) all had many wives and concubines.

Genghis Khan frequently acquired wives and concubines from empires and societies that he had conquered, these women were often princesses or queens that were taken captive or gifted to him. Genghis Khan's most famous concubine was Möge Khatun, who, according to the Persian historian Ata-Malik Juvayni, was "given to Chinggis Khan by a chief of the Bakrin tribe, and he loved her very much." After Genghis Khan died, Möge Khatun became a wife of Ögedei Khan. Ögedei also favored her as a wife, and she frequently accompanied him on his hunting expeditions.

=== Japan ===
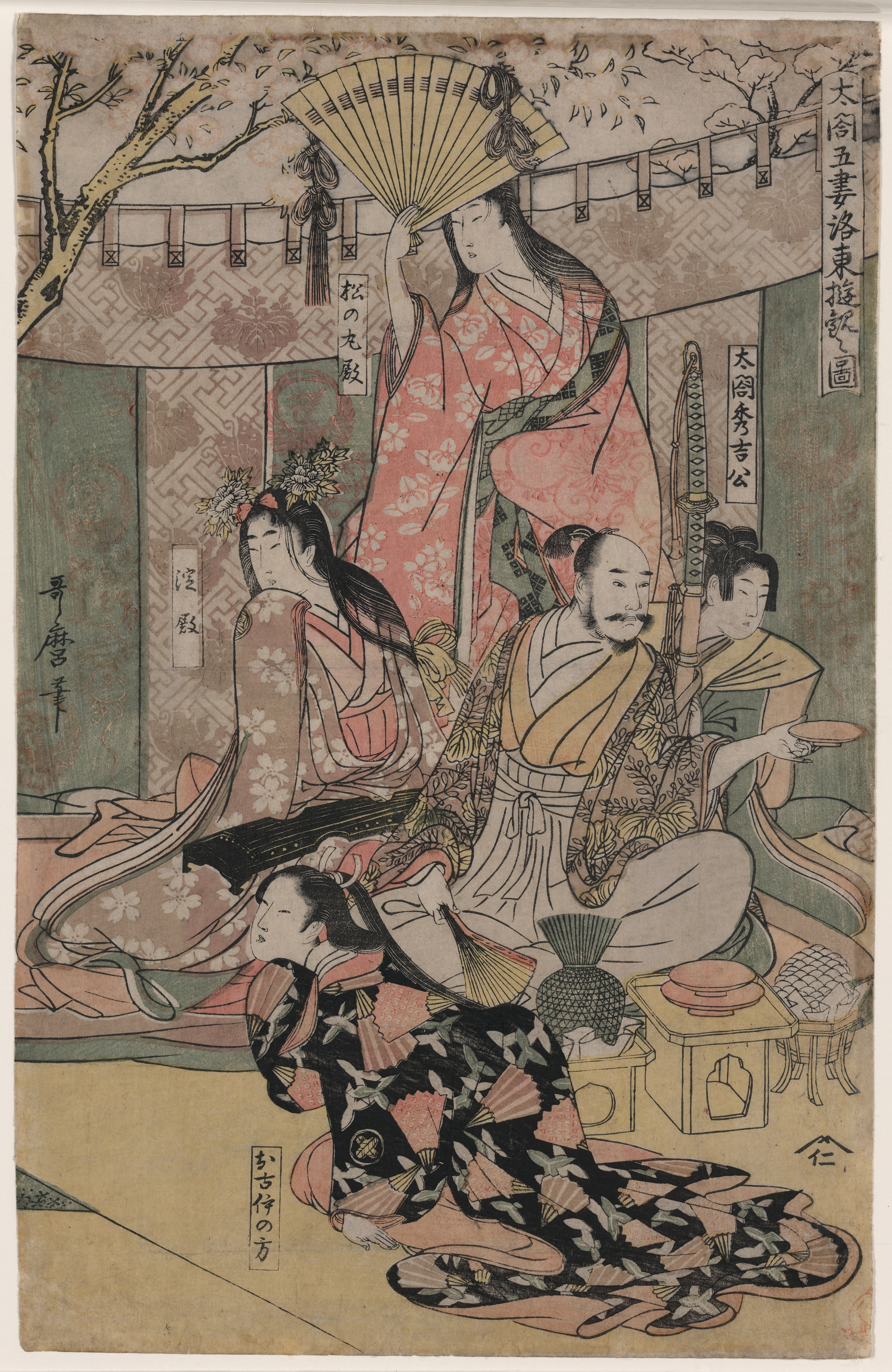
16th-century Samurai Toyotomi Hideyoshi with his wives and concubines

Before monogamy was legally imposed in the Meiji period, concubinage was common among the nobility. Its purpose was to ensure male heirs. For example, the son of an Imperial concubine often had a chance of becoming emperor. Yanagihara Naruko, a high-ranking concubine of Emperor Meiji, gave birth to Emperor Taishō, who was later legally adopted by Empress Haruko, Emperor Meiji's formal wife. Even among merchant families, concubinage was occasionally used to ensure heirs. Asako Hirooka, an entrepreneur who was the daughter of a concubine, worked hard to help her husband's family survive after the Meiji Restoration. She lost her fertility giving birth to her only daughter, Kameko; so her husband—with whom she got along well—took Asako's maid-servant as a concubine and fathered three daughters and a son with her. Kameko, as the child of the formal wife, married a noble man and matrilineally carried on the family name.

A samurai could take concubines but their backgrounds were checked by higher-ranked samurai. In many cases, taking a concubine was akin to a marriage. Kidnapping a concubine, although common in fiction, would have been shameful, if not criminal. If the concubine was a commoner, a messenger was sent with betrothal money or a note for exemption of tax to ask for her parents' acceptance. Even though the woman would not be a legal wife, a situation normally considered a demotion, many wealthy merchants believed that being the concubine of a samurai was superior to being the legal wife of a commoner. When a merchant's daughter married a samurai, her family's money erased the samurai's debts, and the samurai's social status improved the standing of the merchant family. If a samurai's commoner concubine gave birth to a son, the son could inherit his father's social status.

Concubines sometimes wielded significant influence. Nene, wife of Toyotomi Hideyoshi, was known to overrule her husband's decisions at times and Yodo-dono, his concubine, became the de facto master of Osaka castle and the Toyotomi clan after Hideyoshi's death.

=== Korea ===
Joseon monarchs had a harem which contained concubines of different ranks. Empress Myeongseong managed to have sons, preventing sons of concubines from getting power.

Children of concubines often had lower value in account of marriage. A daughter of a concubine could not marry a wife-born son of the same class. For example, Chang Noksu was a concubine-born daughter of a mayor, who was initially married to a slave-servant, and later became a high-ranking concubine of Yeonsangun.

The Joseon dynasty established in 1392 debated whether the children of a free parent and a slave parent should be considered free or slave. The child of a scholar-official father and a slave-concubine mother was always free, although the child could not occupy government positions.

=== India ===
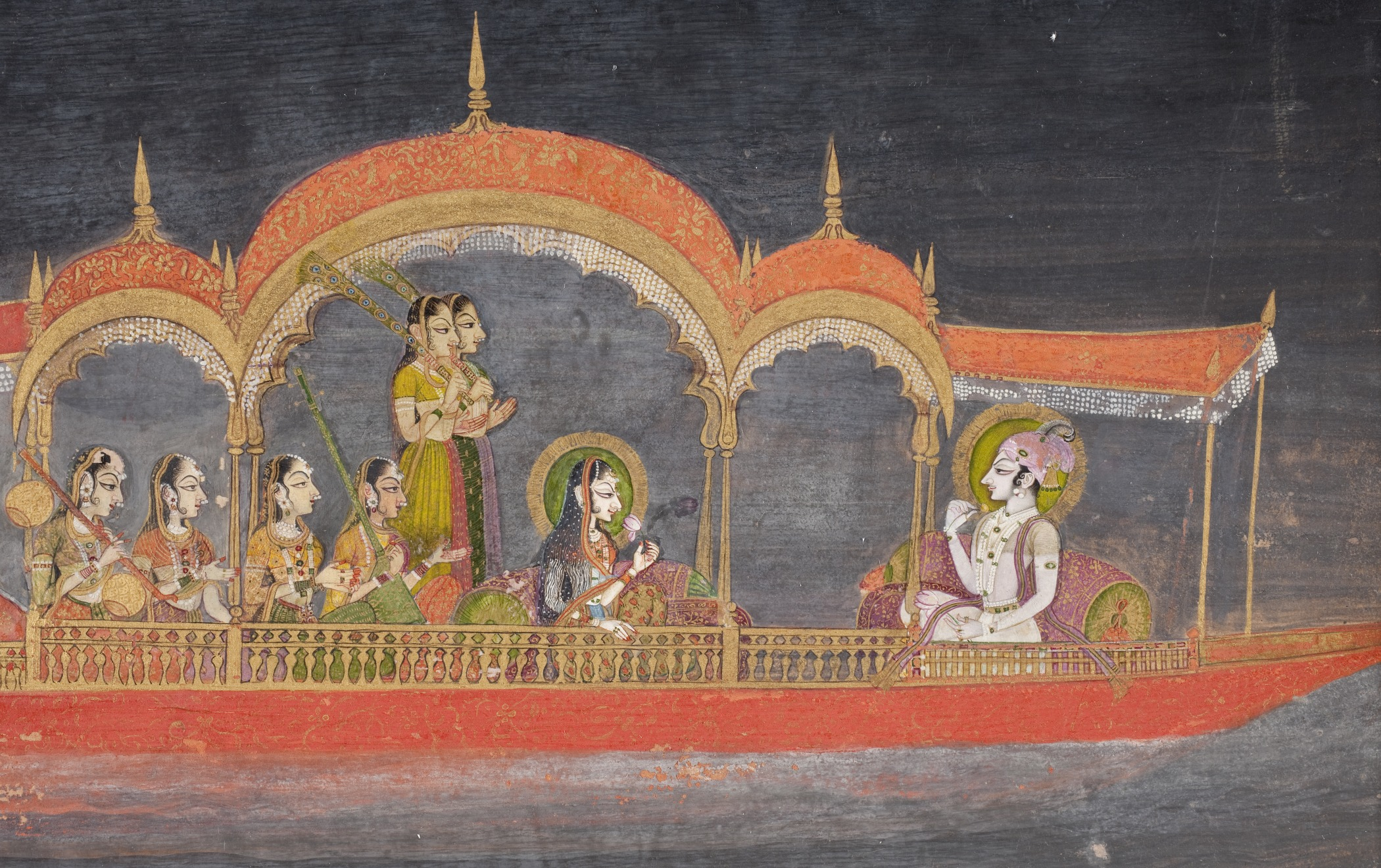
Raja Savant Singh of Kishangarh (reigned 1748–1757) with his favourite concubine Bani Thani.

Nair Nambudiri Sambandam, a form of historical Concubinage in Hinduism from Kerala. Painting by Chithrakaran Murali.

In Hindu society, concubinage was practiced with women with whom marriage was undesirable, such as a woman from an lower-caste or a Dalit woman. Children born of concubinage followed the caste categorization of the mother.

Polygamy and concubinage prevailed in ancient India for rulers and kings.

Before the Independence of India, in Gujarat, the Bhil women were concubines for the Koli landlords.

In medieval Rajasthan, the ruling Rajput family often had certain women called paswan, khawaas, pardayat. These women were kept by the ruler if their beauty had impressed him, but without formal marriage. Sometimes they were given rights to income collected from a particular village, as queens did. Their children were socially accepted but did not receive a share in the ruling family's property and married others of the same status as them.

Concubinage was practiced in elite Rajput households between 16th and 20th centuries. Female slave-servants or slave-performers could be elevated to the rank of concubine (called khavas, pavas) if a ruler found them attractive. The entry into concubinage was marked by a ritual; however, this ritual differentiated from rituals marking marriage. Rajputs often took concubines from Jaat, Gujjar and Muslim families but did not take concubines from the untouchable castes and refrained from taking Charans, Brahmins, and other Rajputs. There are instances of wives eloping with their Rajput lovers and becoming their concubines; one of such popular women was Anara Begum, the concubine of Gaj Singh I of Marwar.

== West Asia and North Africa ==
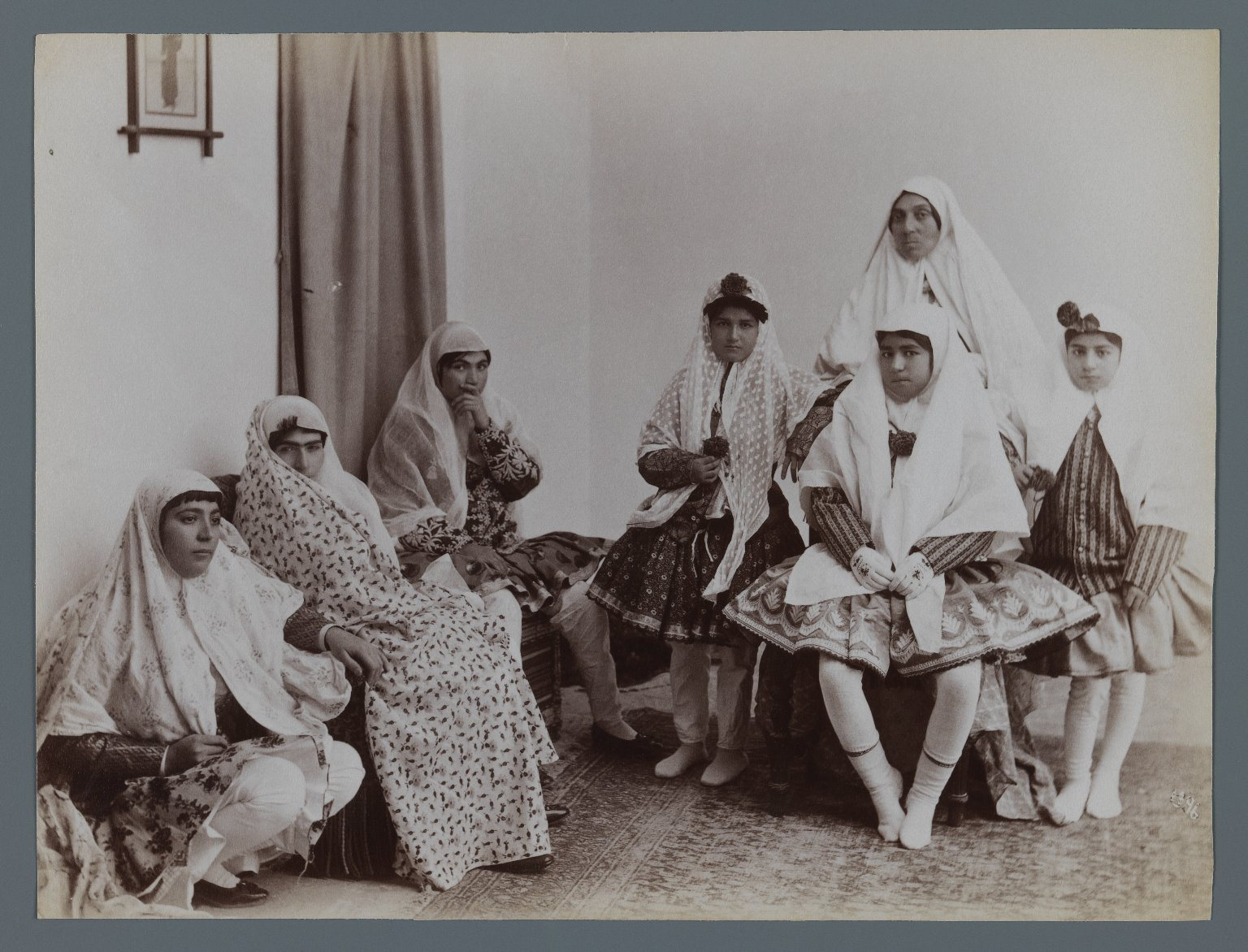
"Harem Scene with Mothers and Daughters in Varying Costumes" (Qajar Iran, late 19th century)

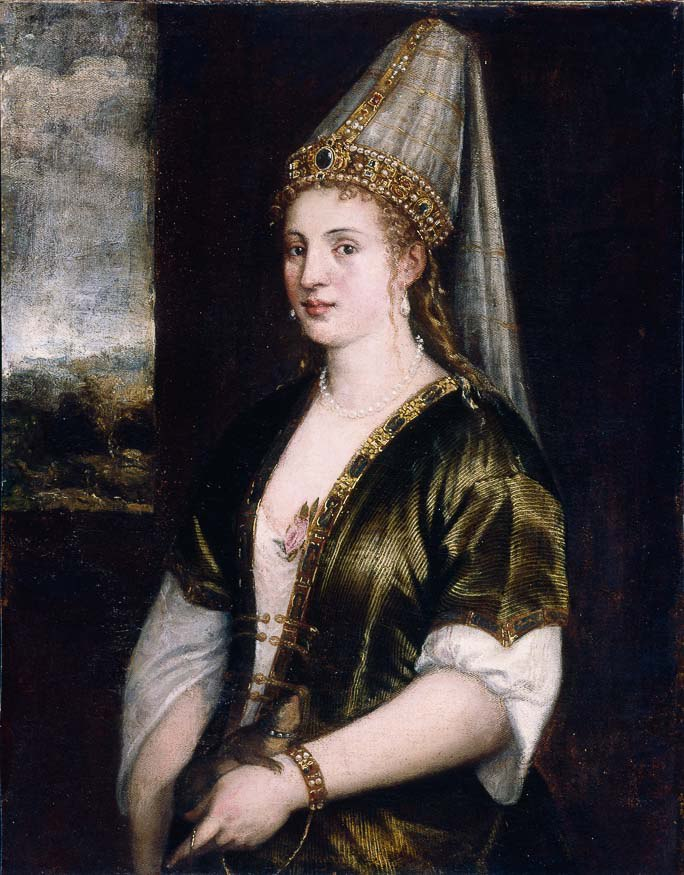
Hurrem Sultan was the "favourite concubine" of Suleiman the Magnificent and later his wife. Suleiman became monogamous with her, breaking Ottoman custom.

In the historic Muslim Arab world, "concubine" (surriyya) referred to the female slave (jāriya), whether Muslim or non-Muslim, with whom her master engages in sexual intercourse in addition to household or other services. Such relationships were common in pre-Islamic Arabia and other pre-existing cultures of the wider region. Islam introduced new regulations to the concubinage and encouraged manumission. Islam furthermore endorsed educating (instruction in Islam), freeing or marrying female slaves if they converted to Islam "abandoning polytheism or infidelity".

If the master chose to acknowledge the children of his concubine, the children were generally declared as legitimate with or without wedlock, and the mother of a free child was considered free upon the death of her male enslaver in the custom of umm walad. Abu Hanifa and others argued for modesty-like practices for the slave concubine, recommending that the concubine be established in the home and their chastity be protected and not to misuse them for sale or sharing with friends or kins. While scholars exhorted masters to treat their slaves "equally", a master was allowed to show favoritism towards a concubine. Islamic scholars have disagreed on the exact interpretation. verse 23:6 in the Quran is believed by some Islamic scholars to say that it is allowed to have sexual intercourse with concubines after marrying them, as Islam forbids sexual intercourse outside marriage. Some scholars recommended holding a wedding banquet (walima) to celebrate the concubinage relationship; however, this is not required in teachings of Islam and is rather the self-preferred opinions of certain non-liberal Islamic scholars. The Arabic term for concubine surriyya may have been derived from sarat meaning "eminence", indicating the concubine's higher status over other female slaves.

The Qur'an does not use the word "surriyya", but instead uses the expression "Ma malakat aymanukum" (that which your right hands own), which occurs 15 times in the book. Sayyid Abul Ala Maududi explains that "two categories of women have been excluded from the general command of guarding the private parts: (a) wives, (b) women who are legally in one's possession".

Some contend that concubinage was a pre-Islamic custom that was allowed to be practiced under Islam, with Jews and non-Muslim people to marry a concubine after teaching her and instructing her well [in Islam] and then giving her freedom. In the traditions of the Abrahamic religions, Abraham had a concubine named Hagar, who was originally a slave of his wife Sarah. The story of Hagar would affect how concubinage was perceived in early Islamic history.

Sikainiga writes that one rationale for concubinage in Islam was that "it satisfied the sexual desire of the female slaves and thereby prevented the spread of immorality in the Muslim community." Most Islamic schools of thought restricted concubinage to a relationship where the female slave was required to be monogamous to her master, (though the master's monogamy to her is not required), but according to Sikainga, in reality this was not always practiced, and female slaves were targeted by other men of the master's household. These opinions of Sikaingia are controversial and contested.

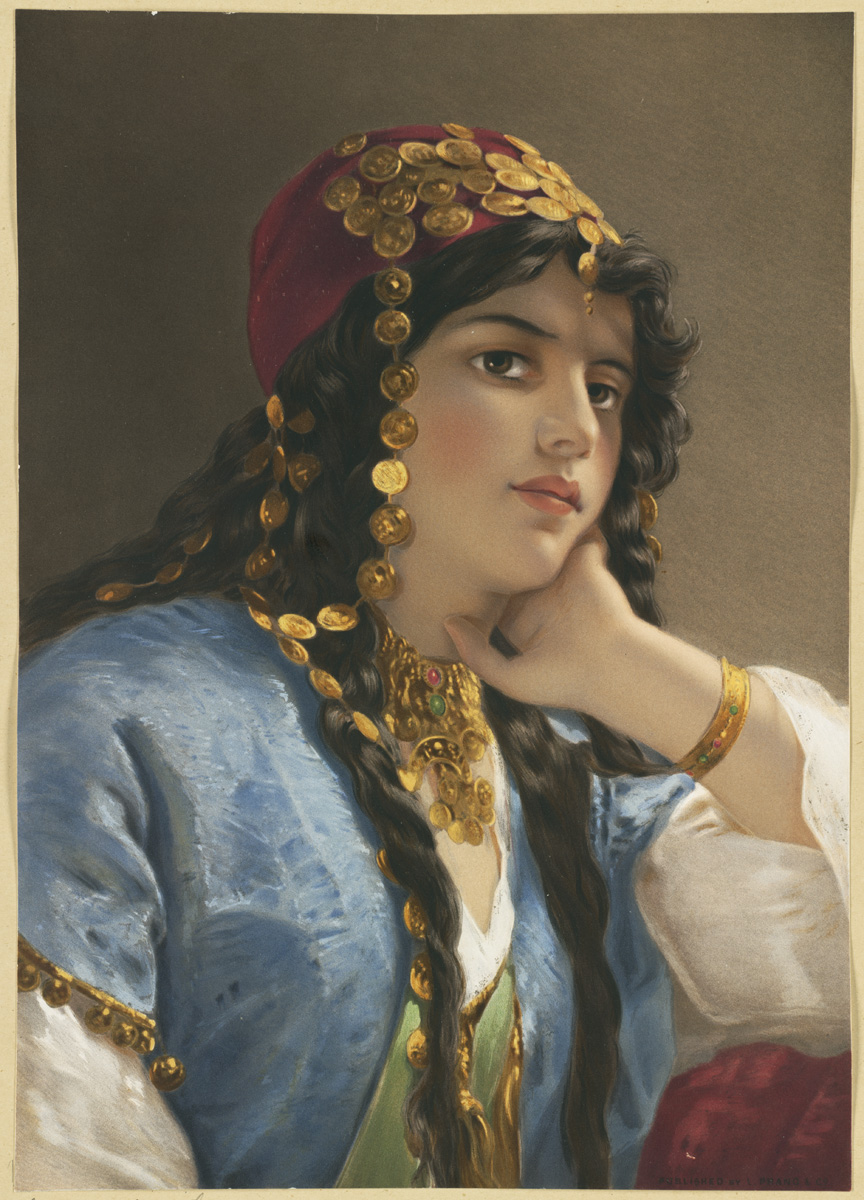
A "cariye" or Ottoman concubine, painting by Gustav Richter (1823–1884)

Historically, two sources for concubines were permitted under an Islamic regime. Primarily, non-Muslim women taken as prisoners of war were made concubines as happened after the Battle of the Trench, or in numerous later Caliphates.

The custom to have concubines was common in all Islamic dynasties until the abolition of slavery in the 20th-century. The expansion of various Muslim dynasties resulted in acquisitions of concubines, through purchase from the slave trade, gifts from other rulers, and captives of war. To have a large number of concubines became a symbol of status. Almost all Abbasid caliphs were born to concubines. Similarly, the sultans of the Ottoman Empire were often the son of a concubine. As a result, some individual concubines came to exercise a degree of influence over Ottoman politics. Some concubines developed social networks, and accumulated personal wealth, both of which allowed them to rise on social status. Ottoman sultans appeared to have preferred concubinage to marriage, and for a time all royal children were born of concubines. The consorts of Ottoman sultans were often neither Turkish, nor Muslim by birth. Leslie Peirce argues that this was because a concubine would not have the political leverage that would be possessed by a princess or a daughter of the local elite. Ottoman sultans also appeared to have only one son with each concubine; that is once a concubine gave birth to a son, the sultan would no longer have intercourse with her. This limited the power of each son. The practice declined with the abolition of slavery, starting in the 19th century and finally abolished in the Arabian Peninsula in the 1960s, with slavery in Saudi Arabia being banned in 1962 and slavery in Oman in 1970.

== East Africa ==
=== Zanzibar ===
Concubinage was legal, widely accepted, and practiced until the early 20th century in Zanzibar. Sultan Seyyid Said had three legal wives, but despite all his marriages being childless, he nevertheless had 36 children, who must thus have been born to slave concubines. The concubines were referred to as sarari or suria, and could be of several different ethnicities, often Ethiopian or Circassian. Ethiopian, Indian or Circassian (white) women were much more expensive than the majority of African women sold in the slave market in Zanzibar, and white women in particular were so expensive that they were in practice almost reserved for the royal harem. According to Henry Morton Stanley, Sultan Barghash bin Said imported Circassian, Georgian and Oromo slave-girls.

=== Somalia ===
Concubinage in Somalia has been documented since the Middle Ages. The Somali port of Zeila was the site of an important slave market where enslaved Abyssinian Ethiopian women, including concubines, were sold. Chinese Ming dynasty records also document the 15th-century Sultan of Mogadishu as having multiple concubines.

During the 19th century, Somali raids on Oromo settlements frequently resulted in the capture and enslavement of Oromo women, while the men were usually killed. Enslaved Oromo women were incorporated into the households of their captors, where they performed domestic labor and were commonly kept as concubines. Regarded as particularly attractive, they commanded the highest prices in Somali slave markets, reportedly valued at around 90 thalers, but their market value varied according to their perceived physical attractiveness. Young Oromo girls employed as domestic servants were known as suriya, a term that also denoted a concubine. In several Somali customary legal systems, including that of the Marehan, an abducted Oromo woman who bore children to her master was recognized as free and became his wife. Slaves of Cushitic origin, such as the Oromo, were regarded by Somalis as more physically similar to themselves than Bantus, particularly due to perceptions of straighter hair and narrower noses, features that contributed to Oromo women being considered more desirable in Somali society.

=== Ethiopia ===
According to Mordechai Abir, the Solomonic Ethiopian king was the only person among the Christian nobility allowed a harem. Though Donald Crummey argues that noblemen also maintained concubines and often elevated some of them to a status approaching that of their principal wives. The Ethiopian King Susenyos kept concubines, although he had to disown them after his conversion to Catholicism. Iyasu I also had multiple concubines in addition to his wives. Likewise Sahle Selassie had 50 eunuchs supervising his concubines. After a difficult marriage, Tewodros II began to keep concubines, although not without remorse. He had several children from his concubines. The Italians also kept concubines during their occupation of Ethiopia through the Madamato system. In 1937, a law was passed that allowed Italians to keep enslaved concubines in Italian East Africa. The concubines of Italian men were generally abducted Amhara and Tigrayan women.

== Europe ==
=== Vikings ===
Polygyny occurred among Vikings, and rich and powerful Viking men could have more than one wife as well as concubines. Vikings competed with one another for access to the marriage market. Viking men could capture women and make them into their wives or concubines. Concubinage for Vikings was connected to slavery; the Vikings took both free women and slaves as concubines. Researchers have suggested that Vikings may have originally started sailing and raiding due to a need to seek out women from foreign lands. There are theories that polygynous relationships in Viking society could have led to a shortage of eligible women for the average male; polygyny increases male–male competition in society because it creates a pool of unmarried men willing to engage in risky status-elevating and sex-seeking behaviors. Thus, the average Viking man could have been forced to perform riskier actions to gain wealth and power to be able to find suitable women. The theory and concept was expressed in the 11th century by historian Dudo of Saint-Quentin in his semi imaginary History of The Normans. The Annals of Ulster depicts raptio and states that in 821 the Vikings plundered an Irish village and "carried off a great number of women into captivity". People taken captive during the Viking raids across Eastern Europe could be sold to Moorish Spain via the Dublin slave trade or transported to Hedeby or Brännö and from there via the Volga trade route to present day Russia, where Slavic slaves and furs were sold to Muslim merchants in exchange for Arab silver dirham and silk, which have been found in Birka, Wollin and Dublin; initially this trade route between Europe and the Abbasid Caliphate passed via the Khazar Kaghanate, but from the early 10th-century onward it went via Volga Bulgaria and from there by caravan to Khwarazm, to the Samanid slave market in Central Asia and finally via Iran to the Abbasid Caliphate in West Asia where there was a great market for slave girls as concubines.

=== Early Christianity and Feudalism ===
The Christian morals developed by Patristic writers largely promoted marriage as the only form of union between men and women. Both Saint Augustine and Saint Jerome strongly condemned the institution of concubinage. Emperor Justinian in his great sixth-century code, the Corpus Iurus Civilis, granted to concubines and their children the sorts of property and inheritance rights usually reserved for wives. He brought the institution of concubinatus closer to marriage, but he also repeated the Christian injunction that concubinage must be permanent and monogamous.

The two views, Christian condemnation and secular continuity with the Roman legal system, continued to be in conflict throughout the entire Middle Ages, until in the 14th and 15th centuries the Roman Catholic Church outlawed concubinage in the territories under its control.

== The Americas ==
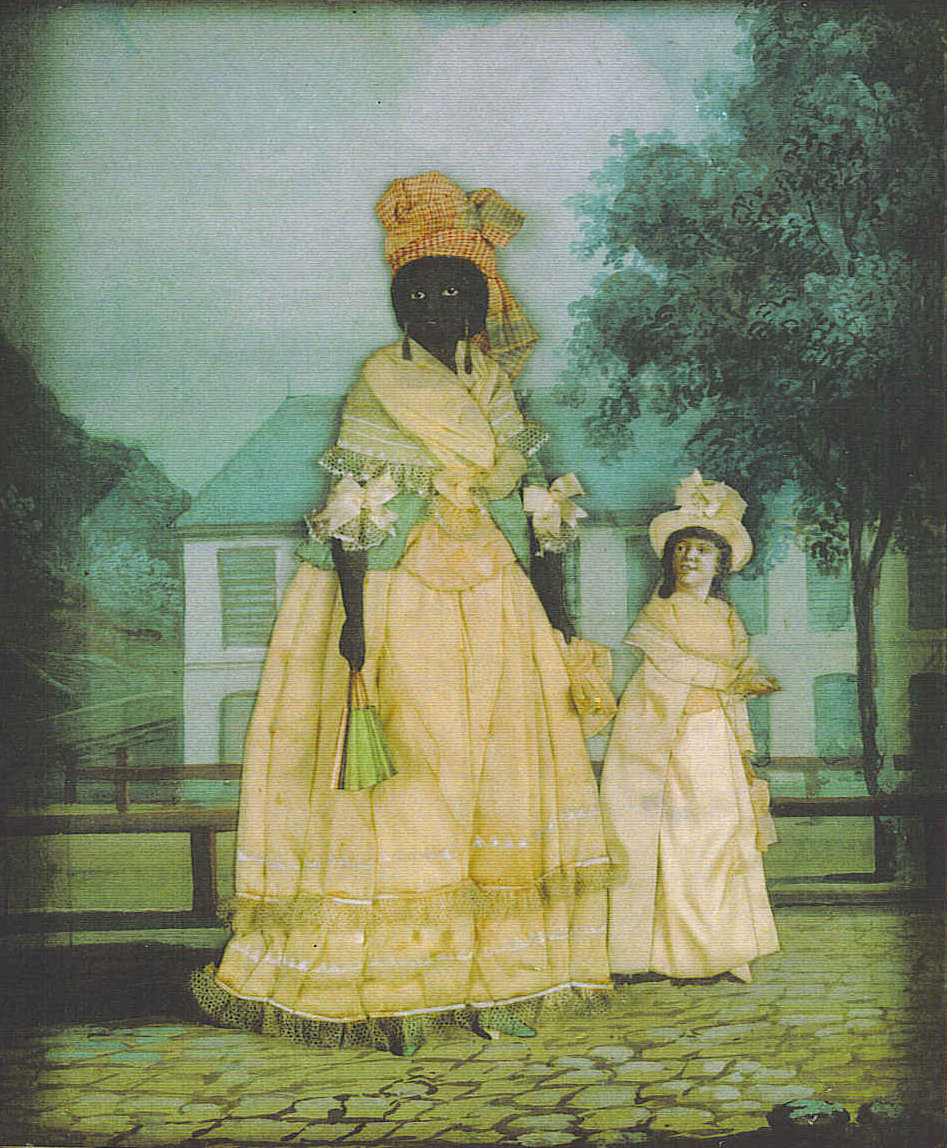
Free woman of color with her quadroon daughter; late 18th century collage painting, New Orleans

During the early stages of European colonialism, administrators often encouraged European men to practice concubinage to discourage them from paying prostitutes for sex (which could spread venereal disease) and from homosexuality. Colonial administrators also believed that having an intimate relationship with a native woman would enhance white men's understanding of native culture and would provide them with essential domestic labor. The latter was critical, as it meant white men did not need wives from the metropole, and thus did not require a family wage. Colonial administrators eventually discouraged the practice when these liaisons resulted in offspring who threatened colonial rule by producing a mixed-race class. This political threat eventually prompted colonial administrators to encourage white women to travel to the colonies, where they contributed to the colonial project while also reinforcing domesticity and the separation of public and private spheres.

When slavery became institutionalized in Colonial America, white men, whether or not they were married, sometimes took enslaved women as concubines; children of such unions remained slaves.

In the various European colonies in the Caribbean, white planters took black and mulatto concubines, owing to the shortage of white women. The children of such unions were sometimes freed from slavery and even inherited from their father, though this was not the case for the majority of children born of such unions. These relationships appeared to have been socially accepted in the colony of Jamaica and even attracted European emigrants to the island.

=== Brazil ===
In colonial Brazil, men were expected to marry women who were equal to them in status and wealth. Alternatively, some men practiced concubinage, an extra-marital sexual relationship. This sort of relationship was condemned by the Catholic Church and the Council of Trent threatened those who engaged in it with excommunication. Concubines constituted both female slaves and former slaves. One reason for taking non-white women as concubines was that free white men outnumbered free white women, although marriage between races was not illegal.

=== New France ===
Some French settlers in New France were recorded to keep native women as "concubines," sometimes while being married to a white woman. This was particularly common in Louisiana, but was discouraged by the clergy.

=== United States ===
Relationships with slaves in the United States and the Confederacy were sometimes euphemistically referred to as concubinary. From lifelong to single or serial sexual visitations, these relationships with enslaved people illustrate a radical power imbalance between a human owned as chattel, and the legal owner of same. When personal ownership of slaves was enshrined in the law, an enslaved person had no legal power over their own legal personhood, the legal control to which was held by another entity; therefore, a slave could never give real and legal consent in any aspect of their life. The inability to give any kind of consent when enslaved is in part due to the ability of a slave master to legally coerce acts and declarations including those of affection, attraction, and consent through rewards and punishments. Legally however, the concept of chattel slavery in the United States and Confederate States defined and enforced in the law owning the legal personhood of a slave; meaning that the proxy for legal consent was found with the slave's master, who was the sole source of consent in the law to the bodily integrity and all efforts of that slave except as regulated or limited by law. With slavery being recognized as a crime against humanity in the United States law, as well as in international customary law, the legal basis of slavery is repudiated for all time, as are any rights which owner-rapists had had to exercise any proxy consent, sexual or otherwise for their slaves.

Free men in the United States sometimes took female slaves in relationships which they referred to as concubinage, although marriage between the races was prohibited by law in the colonies and the later United States. Many colonies and states also had laws against miscegenation or any interracial relations. From 1662 the Colony of Virginia, followed by others, incorporated into law the principle that children took their mother's status, i.e., the principle of partus sequitur ventrem. This led to generations of multiracial slaves, some of whom were otherwise considered legally white (one-eighth or less African, equivalent to a great-grandparent) before the American Civil War.

In some cases, men had long-term relationships with enslaved women, giving them and their mixed-race children freedom and providing their children with apprenticeships, education and transfer of capital. A relationship between Thomas Jefferson and Sally Hemings is an example of this. Such arrangements were more prevalent in the American South during the antebellum period.

=== Plaçage ===
In Louisiana and former French territories, a formalized system of concubinage called plaçage developed. European men took enslaved or free women of color as mistresses after making arrangements to give them a dowry, house or other transfer of property, and sometimes, if they were enslaved, offering freedom and education for their children. A third class of free people of color developed, especially in New Orleans. Many became educated, artisans and property owners. French-speaking and practicing Catholicism, these women combined French and African-American culture and created an elite between those of European descent and the slaves. Today, descendants of the free people of color are generally called Louisiana Creole people.

== In Judaism ==
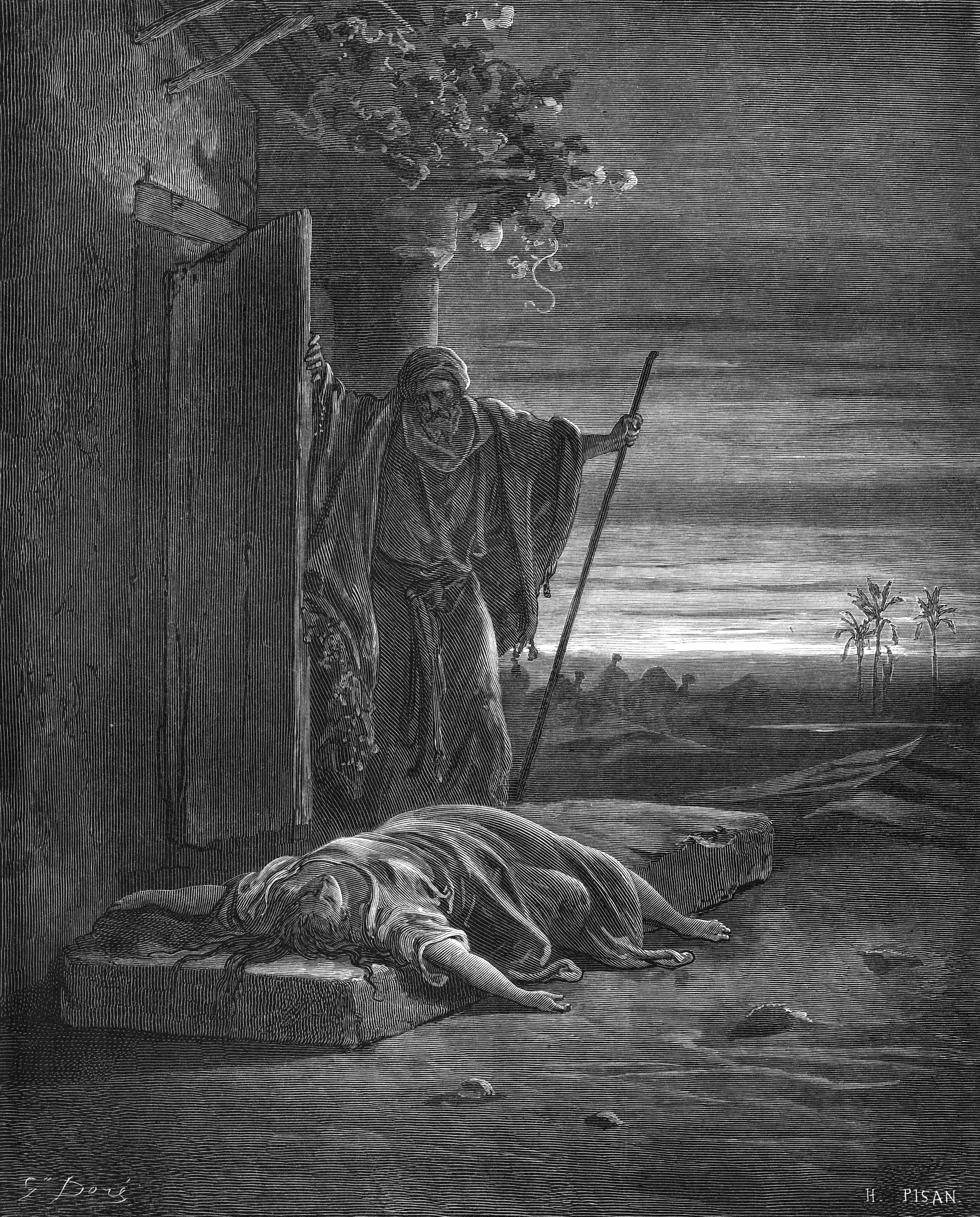
The Israelite discovers his concubine, dead on his doorstep – by Gustave Doré

In Judaism, a concubine is a marital companion of inferior status to a wife. Among the Israelites, men commonly acknowledged their concubines, and such women enjoyed the same rights in the house as legitimate wives.

=== Ancient Judaism ===
The term concubine did not necessarily refer to women after the first wife. A man could have many wives and concubines. Legally, any children born to a concubine were considered to be the children of the wife she was under. The concubine may not have commanded as much respect as the wife. In the Levitical laws on sexual relations, the Hebrew word that is commonly translated as "wife" is distinct from the Hebrew word that means "concubine". However, on at least one other occasion, the term is used to refer to a woman who is not a wife—specifically, the handmaiden of Jacob's wife. In the Levitical code, sexual intercourse between a man and a wife of a different man was forbidden and punishable by death for both persons involved. Since it was regarded as the highest blessing to have many children, wives often gave their maids to their husbands if they were barren, as in the case of Rachel and Bilhah. The children of the concubine often had equal rights with those of the wife. For example, King Abimelech was the son of Gideon and his concubine. Later biblical figures, such as Gideon and Solomon, had concubines in addition to many childbearing wives. For example, the Books of Kings say that Solomon had 700 wives and 300 concubines.

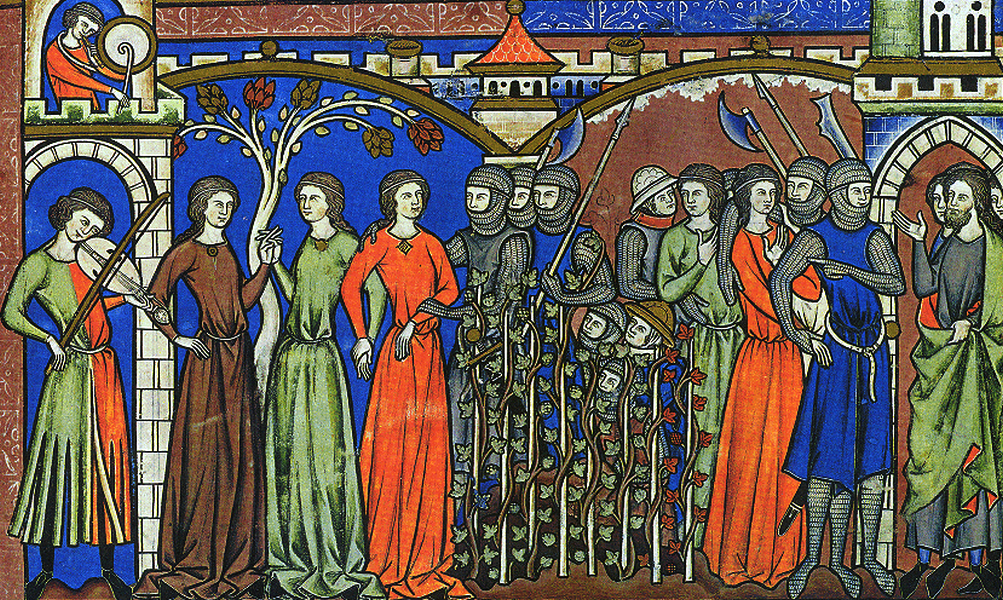
Illustration from the Morgan Bible of the Benjamites taking women of Shiloh as concubines

The account of the unnamed Levite in Judges 19–20 shows that the taking of concubines was not the exclusive preserve of kings or patriarchs in Israel during the time of the Judges, and that the rape of a concubine was completely unacceptable to the Israelite nation and led to a civil war. In the story, the Levite appears to be an ordinary member of the tribe, whose concubine was a woman from Bethlehem in Judah. This woman was unfaithful and eventually abandoned him to return to her paternal household. However, after four months, the Levite, referred to as her husband, decided to travel to her father's house to persuade his concubine to return. She is amenable to returning with him, and the father-in-law is very welcoming. The father-in-law convinces the Levite to remain several additional days, until the party leaves behind schedule in the late evening. The group passes up a nearby non-Israelite town and arrives very late in the city of Gibeah, which is in the land of the Benjaminites. The group sits around the town square, waiting for a local to invite them in for the evening, as was the custom for travelers. A local older man invites them to stay in his home, offering them guest right by washing their feet and offering them food. A band of wicked townsmen attack the house and demand that the host send out the Levite man so they can rape him. The host offers to send out his virgin daughter as well as the Levite's concubine for them to rape, to avoid breaking the guest right towards the Levite. Eventually, to ensure his own safety and that of his host, the Levite gives the men his concubine, who is raped and abused through the night, until she is left collapsed against the front door at dawn. The Levite chose to save himself from rape at the expense of his wife. In the morning, the Levite finds her when he tries to leave. When she fails to respond to her husband's order to get up (possibly because she is dead, although the language is unclear), the Levite places her on his donkey and continues home. Once home, he dismembers her body and distributes the 12 parts throughout the nation of Israel. The Israelites gather to learn why they were sent such grisly gifts, and are told by the Levite of the sadistic rape of his concubine. The crime is considered outrageous by the Israelite tribesmen, who then wreak total retribution on the men of Gibeah, as well as the surrounding tribe of Benjamin, when they support the Gibeahites, killing them without mercy and burning all their towns. The inhabitants of (the town of) Jabesh Gilead are then slaughtered as a punishment for not joining the 11 tribes in their war against the Benjaminites, and their 400 unmarried daughters given in forced marriage to the 600 Benjamite survivors. Finally, the 200 Benjaminite survivors who still have the other tribes grant no wives a mass marriage by abduction.

=== Medieval and modern Judaism ===
In Judaism, concubines are referred to by the Hebrew term pilegesh (פילגש). The term is a loanword from the Ancient Greek παλλακίς, meaning "a mistress staying in [the] house".

In tractate Sanhedrin 21a of the Babylonian Talmud, Rav Yehudah, citing Rav (Abba Arikha), rules that the difference between a concubine and a legitimate wife was that the latter received a ketubah and her marriage (nissu'in) was preceded by an erusin ("formal betrothal"), which was not the case for a concubine. One opinion in the Jerusalem Talmud argues that the concubine should also receive a marriage contract, but without a clause specifying a divorce settlement. According to Rashi, "wives [are those with] with kiddushin and ketubbah, concubines [are those with] with kiddushin but without ketubbah"; this reading is from the Jerusalem Talmud.

Some Jewish thinkers, such as Maimonides, believed that concubines were strictly reserved for royal leadership and thus that a commoner may not have a concubine. Indeed, such thinkers argued that commoners may not engage in any type of sexual relations outside of marriage. Maimonides was not the first Jewish thinker to criticise concubinage. For example, the compiler of Leviticus Rabbah severely condemns the custom. Other Jewish thinkers, such as Nahmanides, Rabbi Samuel ben Uri Shraga Phoebus, and Rabbi Jacob Emden, strongly objected to the idea that concubines should be forbidden. Despite these prohibitions, concubinage remained widespread among Jewish households in the Ottoman Empire and resembled the practice among Muslim households.

In Modern Hebrew in contemporary Israel, pilegesh is often used as the equivalent of the English word "mistress"—i.e., the female partner in extramarital relations—regardless of legal recognition. Attempts have been initiated to popularise pilegesh as a form of premarital, non-marital, or extramarital relationship, which, according to the perspective of proponents, is permitted by Halakha.

== Concubinage and slavery ==
In some context, the institution of concubinage diverged from a free quasi-marital cohabitation to the extent that it was forbidden to a free woman to be involved in a concubinage and the institution was reserved only to slaves. This type of concubinage was practiced in patriarchal cultures throughout history. Many societies automatically freed the concubine after she had a child. Among societies that did not legally require the manumission of concubines, it was usually done anyway. In slave-owning societies, most concubines were slaves, but not all. The feature of concubinage that made it attractive to certain men was that the concubine was dependent on the man; she could be sold or punished at the master's will. According to Orlando Peterson, slaves taken as concubines would have had a higher level of material comfort than the slaves used in agriculture or in mining.

== See also ==
- Courtesan
- Polygamy
- Polygamy in Christianity
- Polygyny
- Cicisbeo
- Contubernium
- Common-law marriage
