= Concubinatus =

Quasi-marital relationship involving Roman citizens

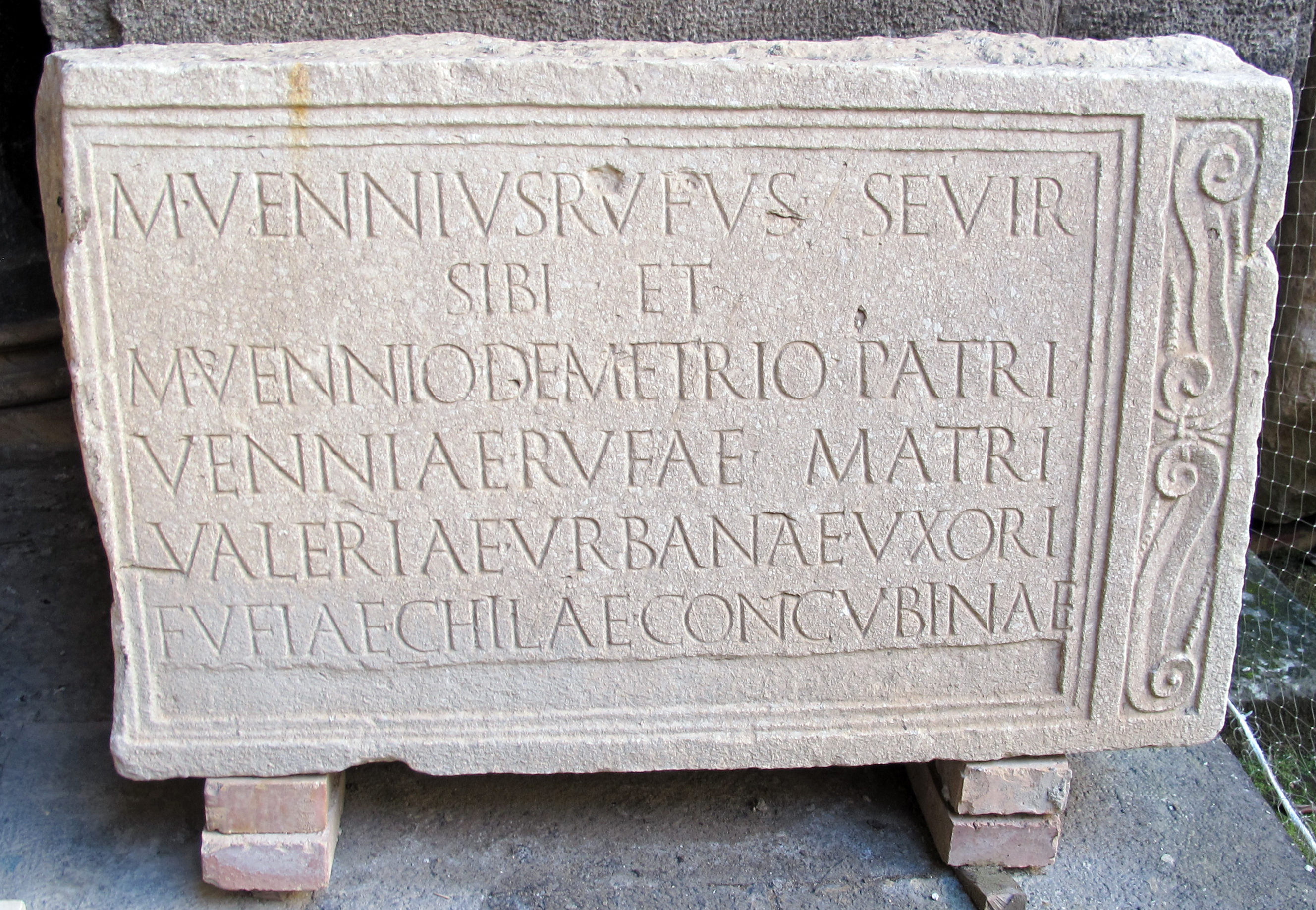
The concubina Fufia Chila is included in this family gravestone set up by Marcus Vennius Rufus to commemorate himself, his father and mother, and his wife (Museo Archeologico Nazionale di Napoli )

Concubinatus (Latin, "concubinage") was a monogamous union, intended to be of some duration but not necessarily permanent, that was socially and to some extent legally recognized as an alternative to marriage in the Roman Empire. Concubinage became a legal concern in response to Augustan moral legislation that criminalized adultery and imposed penalties on some consensual sexual behaviors outside marriage.

Reasons for choosing concubinatus over marriage varied. If one partner was freeborn and belonged to the senatorial order, and the other was a former slave, there were legal penalties for marrying. More generally, wealthy widowers or divorced men might avoid the legal complexities of a second marriage in preserving their estates for heirs while still acknowledging a commitment to their partner. However, both partners might be freedpersons, with the benefits of concubinatus over marriage for people of this status not entirely clear in the historical record. Concubinatus was distinguished in Roman law from contubernium, a de facto marriage in which the partners were both slaves or one was a slave and the other a freedperson.

The female partner, "perhaps always" the person of lower social rank in the Classical period, was a concubina, literally a "bedmate", one for lying with, but a socially respectable role in contrast to the paelex, a sexual partner who was a rival to a wife. The naming of a concubina as such in epitaphs indicates that she was accepted as part of the extended family, and juristic texts accord the concubina certain protections. The listing of concubinae along with legal wives on grave markers indicates serial monogamy, not their coexistence, as tombs were often communal and included multiple members of a household, from different times of the male partner's life.

In Latin literature, however, concubinae are more often disparaged as female slaves kept as sexual luxuries, sometimes along with eunuchs. The discrepancy lies in whether the union was legally verifiable as monogamous concubinatus; an ancilla (female slave as part of a household) might be kept as a "bedmate" and referred to as concubina but was not eligible for the privileges of formal concubinage. The equivalent term for a male, concubinus, is used only informally, most often for a same-sex relationship.

== Paelex ==
Although usage of the word concubina during the Roman Empire poses ambiguities of role and status, the difference between the Imperial-era concubine as a subject of legal interest and a paelex or extralegal concubine during the Republic is fairly straightforward: the paelex was a woman "installed" by a married man as a sexual rival to his wife, whereas the concubina was a wife-like companion as well as sexual partner.

According to the 2nd-century antiquarian Aulus Gellius, in early Rome paelex was a disparaging word for a woman in a continuing sexual liaison with a man who had also contracted an archaic form of marriage cum manu, meaning that he held patriarchal power over his wife. In a much-cited law attributed to the semilegendary Numa Pompilius, second king of Rome (ca. 716–673 BCE), a concubine (paelex, not a concubina) was barred from the cultivation of Juno, the goddess of marriage: "a paelex shall not touch the altar of Juno. If she touches it, she shall sacrifice, with her hair unbound, a ewe lamb to Juno."

The paelex in Latin literature is a woman perceived as a sexual threat by the wife, just as Juno was perpetually aggrieved by her husband Jupiter's "affairs", few if any of which were perpetrated with willing partners. In literary mythology, particularly in the cycle of myths pertaining to the Trojan War, the paelex is often a war captive and hence slave brought into the home as booty by the returning husband. The word paelex is so used by the comic playwright Plautus and was the title of a lost play by Naevius. Writing under Augustus, Ovid often uses the word paelex for abducted or captive women and for non-wives subjected to domestic rape in the myths he depicts in the Metamorphoses and other works. In these stories, the paelex is often depicted as foreign or barbarian.

As concubinatus became regularized under Imperial law and the status of the concubina elevated as the extralegal equivalent of a wife within imposed monogamy, usage of paelex inversely degraded so that it came to mean nothing more than a woman who had sex with a married man, and in late antiquity seems to have been a synonym for "prostitute" or "whore".

== Legislative and social background ==
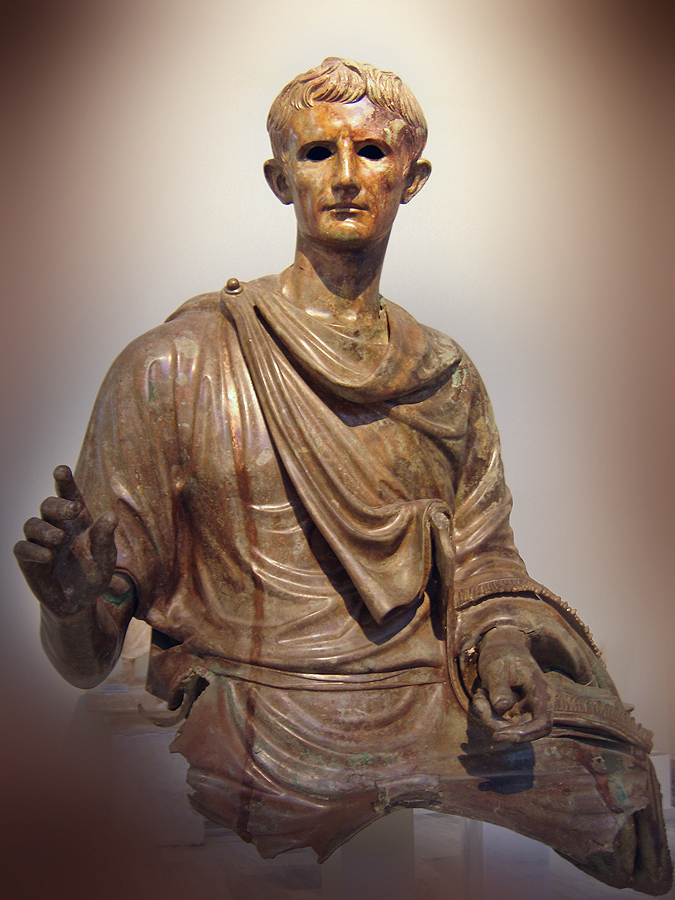
Fragment from an equestrian statue of Augustus (1st century BCE)

During the reign of Augustus, the first Roman emperor, certain forms of sexual conduct outside marriage, including some consensual behaviors, were criminalized as stuprum, illicit sexual intercourse, sometimes translated as "criminal debauchery" or "sex crime". Stuprum encompasses diverse sexual offenses including rape and adultery. Stuprum could only be committed against a citizen in good standing; slaves and prostitutes were neither protected by nor liable to these laws, nor were the infames, those whose social standing was permanently compromised by their professions or offenses against public morality.

Previously in the Republican era, the father of an unmarried daughter could bring a charge of rape against a man who had sex with her, regardless of her consent, because marriage was required for sexual access to women who had standing as citizens. Rape was a capital crime, but the man's intentions mattered, and paternal accusations of "rape" – including bride abduction or elopement when the woman had consented – were generally settled privately among families. Adultery likewise was normally considered a private matter for families to deal with, not a serious criminal offense, though the censors could reduce the status of men who debased the institution of marriage, and some cases of adultery and sexual transgressions by women had been brought to the aediles for judgment.

After 18 BC, the lex Iulia de adulteriis ("Julian law on adultery") and other legislation established illicit sex as a concern of public law. If a man was accused of rape, the consent of his female partner was no defense – he could still be charged with the more general sex crime of stuprum against a citizen, or with adulterium if either was married to someone else, and consent implicated the woman in the crime too. If the man was unmarried, his female sexual partners were thus limited to slaves, prostitutes, or the infames, persons against whom stuprum could not be committed – "frivolous liaisons" and not the kind of moral uplift the legislation was intended to promote. Concubinatus evolved to accommodate a relationship which was based on companionship, including but not limited to sexual companionship, but which was not likely to result in a marriage, for any variety of reasons.

Although not a legal institution, concubinatus raised questions in relation to marriage, and concubines occupied an entire chapter, now fragmentary, in the 6th-century compilation of Roman law known as the Digest. The ad hoc nature of concubinatus is reflected in the varied and at times conflicting legal reasoning on the part of Roman jurists. Even legal experts had trouble navigating the hazards of stuprum in parsing which women were eligible as sexual partners outside marriage and which could be partners in monogamous concubinage without damaging either party's social standing. The jurist Ulpian said that "only those women with whom intercourse is not unlawful can be kept in concubinage without the fear of committing a crime," but if a woman was already a penalty-free sexual partner, concubinatus would not be necessary to avoid a charge of stuprum. The jurist Modestinus defined stuprum as sexual relations with a free woman (libera mulier) outside marriage, unless she was a concubina.

What legally differentiated concubinage from marriage was affectio maritalis, the intention of both partners to enter into marriage and have children. Marriage itself existed in several forms, at times elusive of proof, as the jurist Papinian noted. But a person committed to a concubinatus was not allowed to have a spouse at the same time – a man could not have both a legal wife (uxor) and a concubina.

Concubinatus came to define many unions that would be unsuitable marriages according to Roman custom, such as a senator's desire to marry a freedwoman or his cohabitation with a former prostitute. Concubinatus between a woman of senatorial rank and her former slave might be possible but was not condoned, in part because the Romans disapproved of the woman having the higher status in relationships that were not socially equal. The inequality of concubinatus is paralleled in the marriage of a master to a slave he has freed for this purpose; when the manumission of a freedwoman had been arranged on the condition that she marry her former master, she lacked the usual agency of Roman women in marriage and could obtain a divorce only with the male partner's consent or under other very limited circumstances. A quasi-marital relationship involving a Roman citizen and a foreigner was not considered concubinage but a non-Roman marriage based on international law (matrimonium juris gentium), without legal consequences except those deriving from the ius gentium.

=== Testatio ===
Testatio is a general term for an evidentiary document signed by witnesses. Although not a requirement, a formal concubinatus might benefit from the preparation of a testatio, a document declaring the couple's honorable intention in the presence of witnesses, who signed it. It was not a "marriage license" issued by the state but rather a document drawn up by the consenting parties, similar to documents expressing intent and consent to marry. The relevant passage from the Digest is vexed, but the jurist appears to recommend preparing such a document as the best way to ward off charges of stuprum when the concubine was a freeborn woman in good standing. (Note: Cohabitation with a freeborn prostitute would not be a crime, since sex with a prostitute by definition was not stuprum.) The testatio was one way that concubinatus mirrored marriage as an institution.

=== Children ===
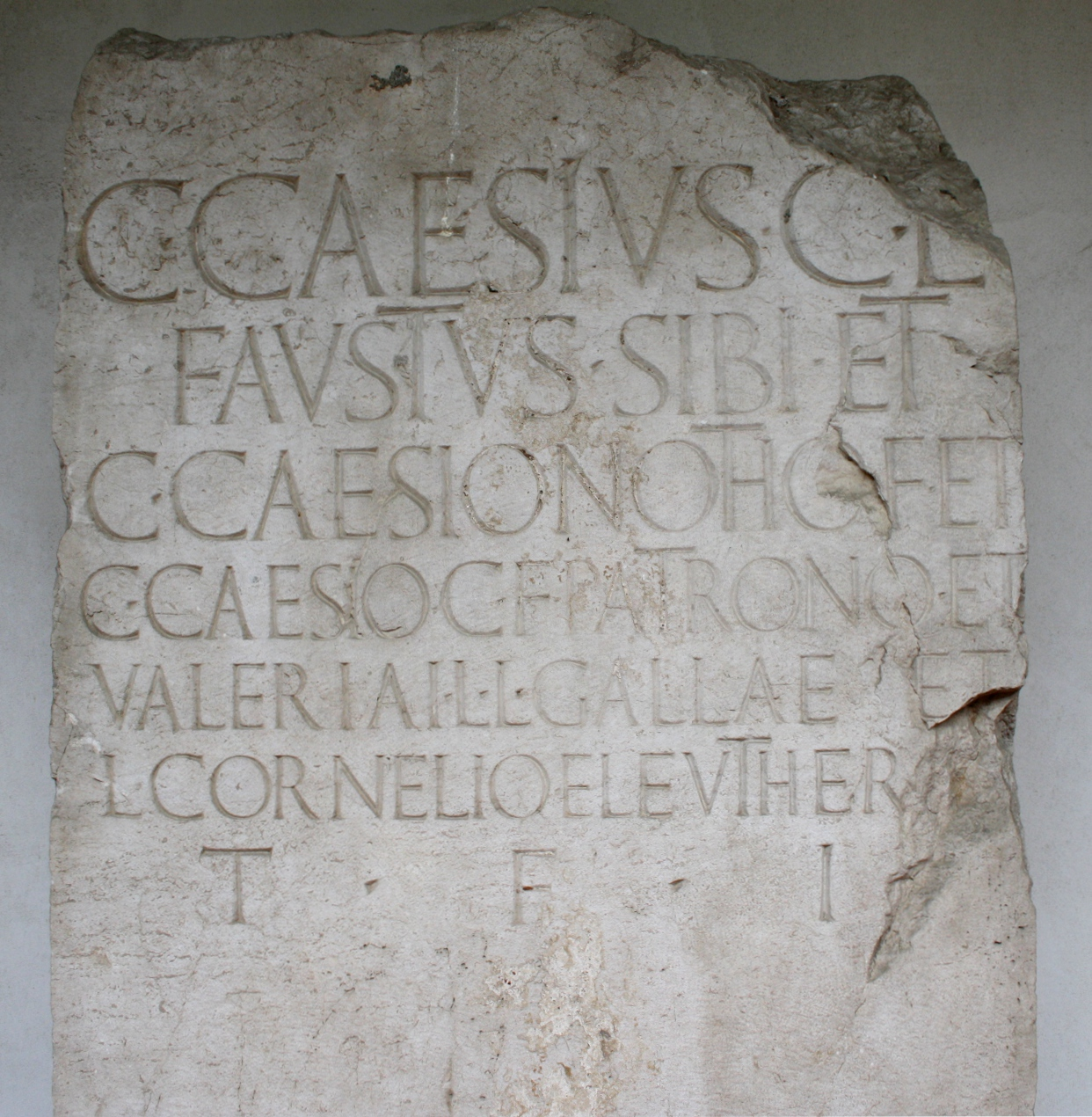
Gravestone set up by Gaius Caesius Faustus, the freedman of Gaius Caesius, for himself; his natural son, Gaius Caesius Nothus; his former master's son, Gaius Caesius; Valeria Galla, possibly his concubine, identified as the freedwoman of a Lucius Valerius; and Lucius Cornelius Eleutherus (1st century AD)

Concubinatus differed mainly from lawful marriage in the legal status of heirs. The couple's children were naturales, "natural" children. A filius naturalis (feminine filia naturalis) was any child born into a family formed from a concubinatus or contubernium union, which were not valid marriages in Roman law, or more generally any child whose biological paternity was known. The naturalis was distinguished from a filius legitimus (a child born from a legally valid marriage) or spurius (a child of unknown paternity). (Note: Because a slave was denied legal personhood, a male slave could not exercise paternal rights under Roman law, and his child might be considered both "natural" and spurius.)

Because an ancilla could not be a partner in concubinatus, her child could not be legitimated simply by calling her a concubina. The purpose of this enactment under Constantine I was to discourage men of decurion rank from cohabiting with ancillae and introducing questions of legitimacy into the family's hereditary civic obligations. However, in the later empire, children born into concubinage could be legitimated if the couple married legally, and the emperor could grant legitimation as a special privilege. Retroactive legitimation of children was an encouragement for a man of rank to marry the freeborn concubina with whom he had been living monogamously when he had no legitimate heirs from a previous marriage.

Roman inheritance law was one reason that a man of high rank would live with a woman in concubinage after the death of his first wife; the claims of his children from the first marriage could not be challenged by naturales children from the later union. Marcus Aurelius had a concubina rather than remarrying so that relations with his children would not be complicated by a stepmother. Children are mentioned infrequently in connection with concubinatus, and in her study of the subject Beryl Rawson wondered whether children were perhaps not particularly desired from this relationship.

== The male partner ==
There is no word to specify the male partner in concubinatus. An upper-class man who had a concubina generally was either a young man who was not ready to enter a permanent marriage, or a widower or divorcé who had already produced heirs and was seeking companionship for its own sake. Men of senatorial rank had the most narrow options for contracting a valid marriage. The lex Iulia et Papia of 9 CE set up legal barriers to senators (Note: When the Augustan legislation was first passed, a marriage with the unsuitable female partner would remain valid, though the status of the male partner was officially degraded. A senatus consultum under Marcus Aurelius and Commodus voided the marriage.) marrying women with certain debilities of status, including freedwomen; women whose professions made them infamis, such as stage performers; prostitutes; or any woman who had ever been apprehended in the commission of a crime, regardless of conviction. Men who violated the ban by marrying an inappropriate partner were legally considered caelibes, unmarried, and were subject to penalties under the laws regulating marriage and morality.

The succession of female partners of the future Saint Augustine (born 353 CE in Roman Africa) demonstrates the pattern of the young man seeking steady sexual companionship in the period between puberty and age thirty. From the age of 18 to 29, during the time when he was a Manichee, Augustine had a concubine, conceiving a natural son (filius naturalis) with her in the first year they were together. He was faithful to her and wrote that their relationship was lacking only "the honorable name of marriage", but when he became engaged to a ten-year-old girl at the instigation of his mother, he dumped the concubina and sent her back to Africa. He does not name his concubina, although he says he was brokenhearted at her loss, and he keeps their son, who dies in childhood, while he assents to a marriage partner whose family would be an asset to his planned career. During the two years he had to wait for his fiancée to come of marriageable age, Augustine felt unable to remain celibate and took a second concubine. As it turned out, he never wed, owing to his new Christian calling, but his writings contain a great deal of moral guidance on sexual behavior and the responsibilities of marriage.

Several emperors had an acknowledged and socially accepted concubina after the death of the first wife, including Vespasian, Antoninus Pius, and Marcus Aurelius. If an emperor wanted a wife of appropriate social status, he could readily find one, and the choice of a particular woman, particularly a freedwoman as in all three of these unions, may argue for a relationship based on personal affection.

This inequality of status in concubinatus may evoke romantic ideals or power dynamics, but when freedwomen are identified as concubinae in inscriptions, their partner most often is also a former slave; only about 21 percent of male partners can be identified as freeborn, but about 68 percent are liberti. Freedpersons were expected to retain ties of loyalty and sometimes contractual obligations to their former owners as patrons, and the formalities of marriage might have been seen as introducing complications or potential conflicts of interest between the partners. At the same time, concubinatus seems also to have functioned socially as a way to strengthen bonds between families, in much the way of marriage alliances. And since a freedman had his success and status in his community advertised on his funerary monument, the inclusion of a concubina must not have been contrary to his purpose in demonstrating his ability to form his own stable social relationships and to support a household. Among male partners who are either freedmen or of unstated status, a significant number are commemorated for their roles in imperial cult or local government. Male partners were also employed in everyday occupations such as "repairer of carding-combs" or cloak dealer that would make them the ancient equivalent of securely "middle class", neither poor nor wealthy.

In contrast to marriage, which required an intention to marry on the part of both parties and for which the social equality of partners was preferred, legal cases determining whether a relationship was marriage or concubinatus generally prioritize the intentions of the male partner. Funerary inscriptions for men that mention a series of formal partners identified variously as wives or concubines tend to have been arranged by the man himself, whereas a concubine who puts up a memorial to her late partner generally names only the two of them.

=== Soldiers and concubinae ===
In the provinces, active-duty soldiers during the Principate were not permitted to marry, but inscriptions indicate that they sometimes had a local concubina. These unions may often have been an exception to the norms of concubinage as an alternative to marriage when marriage was not desired; rather, they were substitutes for marriage when marriage was not permitted. A pair of inscriptions set up by brothers, veterans of the Eighth Legion, points to the difficulty of understanding the reasons for choosing concubinage or marriage: both brothers commemorate their female partners, but one had married a freedwoman following his discharge, while the other had a freedwoman of his family (gens) as a concubina.

== The concubina ==
The title of concubine was not necessarily derogatory in ancient Rome, as it was inscribed on tombstones. Concubinae named on funerary monuments are described with laudatory language and imagery used for wives. Almost 200 known inscriptions, mostly from Rome and the Italian peninsula, name women as concubinae; of these, 67 are identified as libertae, freedwomen. Only three are ingenuae, freeborn. Concubinae are included in inscriptions on family tombs, and it is not unusual to find them listed along with the male head of household's legitimate children and deceased wife. Epitaphs for the whole family to be laid to rest in a particular spot often were set up on a single stone in advance or were added to later, complicating the determination of the order in which the man might have had wives and concubines. In Rome, an inscription set up by the lictor and freedman Marcus Servilius Rufus records three female partners: a wife (uxor), a concubina specified as deceased, and another wife, listed in that order. The first wife named was probably his partner at the time Rufus had the inscription made; the concubina already deceased; and the second wife added when he remarried after the death of the first.

A woman in concubinatus with a man of high rank might be technically eligible for marriage but not socially feasible as a wife for him. She benefitted from an improved standard of living and could receive "substantial" gifts from her partner. (Note: One of the peculiarities of Roman marriage was that spouses could not give each other gifts, so that the finances of upper-class or property-owning couples could be kept separate.) These gifts were hers to keep and could not be taken back if the relationship ended. Susan Treggiari described the situation of a woman in concubinatus as "relatively secure". Concerning the difference between a concubine and a wife, the jurist Paulus wrote that "a concubine differs from a wife only in the regard in which she is held", meaning that a concubina was not a social equal, as his wife ideally was. The minimum age for becoming a concubina was twelve, the legal age of betrothal for Roman girls (fourteen for boys).

One example of an imperial concubina is Galeria Lysistrata, who was the freedwoman of Faustina, the wife of Antoninus Pius, and succeeded her as the emperor's primary female companion. Lysistrata's relationship is unusually high-profile but fits a common pattern of concubinae who had been freed by women. The freedwomen concubines of the imperial house wielded considerable political influence.

Roman law is fairly clear that a relationship with an ancilla – a female slave of a household - could not be regarded as concubinatus, though some of these recognized relationships may have begun when one partner was still of enslaved status. But even an informal "bed-mate" who was a slave had some legal protections. If her owner went bankrupt, nearly all his assets were subject to being seized by creditors and sold, excluding personal possessions such as clothes and slaves who were established in the household as personal attendants. Among these exclusions were a concubina and any natural children he had fathered with a female slave, as Roman law tended to discourage breaking up families. In late antiquity, an "obscure" constitutio under Justinian seems to suggest that if an ancilla had lived with her master as his concubine for a long time and until his death, and if he had no other wife at the time, she would be released from slavery and any children they had would be regarded as freeborn. She was also entitled to keep any peculium accumulated for her, the fund or property a master set aside for a slave's use.

== Christian concubinage ==
An exception to the lower status of women in concubinatus arises with the spread of Christianity. Perhaps because Roman state religion was intertwined with the holding of public office and serving in the military, men were slower to convert to Christianity than women. An upper-class Christian woman therefore might have to choose between marriage with a social equal and concubinatus with a Christian male of lower rank. The First Council of Toledo (400 CE) recognized the respectability of concubinatus as a monogamous union by not denying communion to the participants, but men who had both a wife (uxor) and a concubine were excluded.

== Concubinus ==
The masculine form concubinus might be used of the subordinate male partner of either a man or a woman. Since no same-sex unions were recognized as legal forms of marriage under Roman law, a man's concubinus could not be a partner in concubinatus as a legally recognized form of de facto marriage. Literary references generally treat the concubinus of a man as a form of puer delicatus, a well-groomed slave boy who might be so young that from the perspective of 21st-century sexual ethics the relationship would express pedophilia.

In the only extant and complete wedding song from Roman antiquity, Catullus warns the groom that he will have to give up his concubinus, (Note: In this instance, the situation of the concubinus mirrors that of the concubina who must be given up when the man contracts a legitimate marriage.) who himself is about to leave boyhood for adolescence. The imperial biographer Suetonius refers to a concubinus of Galba who remained the emperor's companion as he grew older. Concubinus might also be used disparagingly of a subordinate male kept at the pleasure of a woman of superior status. No concubinus is identified as such in any known inscription.

== See also ==
- Marriage in ancient Rome
- Sexuality in ancient Rome

== Bibliography ==
- Armstrong, Rebecca (2006). Cretan Women: Pasiphaë, Ariadne, and Phaedra in Latin Poetry. Oxford Classical Monographs. Oxford University Press.
- Buckland, W. W. (1908). The Roman Law of Slavery: The Condition of the Slave in Private Law from Augustus to Justinian. Cambridge University Press.
- Dixon, Suzanne (1992). The Roman Family. Johns Hopkins University Press.
- Evans-Grubbs, Judith (1993). "'Marriage More Shameful Than Adultery': Slave-Mistress Relationships, 'Mixed Marriages', and Late Roman Law". Phoenix. 47 (2): 125–154. doi:10.2307/1088581. JSTOR 1088581.
- Fantham, Elaine (2011). Roman Readings: Roman Response to Greek Literature from Plautus to Statius and Quintilian. De Gruyter.
- Finkenauer, Thomas (2023). "Filii Naturales: : Social Fate or Legal Privilege?". The Position of Roman Slaves. De Gruyter: 25–66. doi:10.1515/9783110987195-002. ISBN 978-3-11-098719-5.
- Grimal, Pierre (1986) [1967]. Love in Ancient Rome. OU Press. ISBN 9780806120140.
- Kiefer, O. (12 November 2012). Sexual Life In Ancient Rome. Routledge. ISBN 978-1-136-18198-6.
- Lefkowitz, Mary R.; Fant, Maureen B. (2005). Women's Life in Greece and Rome. Baltimore: JHUP. ISBN 0-8018-4474-6.
- Lindheim, Sara H. (2003). Mail and Female: Epistolary Narrative and Desire in Ovid's Heroides. University of Wisconsin Press.
- McGinn, Thomas A. J. (1991). "Concubinage and the Lex Iulia on Adultery". Transactions of the American Philological Association. 121: 335–375. doi:10.2307/284457. JSTOR 284457.
- Murgatroyd, Paul (2005). Mythical and Legendary Narrative in Ovid's Fasti. Brill.
- Noonan, John T. (1986). Contraception: A History of Its Treatment by the Catholic Theologians and Canonists. Harvard University Press.
- Rawson, Beryl (1974). "Roman Concubinage and Other De Facto Marriages". Transactions of the American Philological Association. 104. JHUP: 279–305. doi:10.2307/2936094. JSTOR 2936094.
- Sandon, Tatjana; Scalso, Luca (2020). "More Than Mistresses, Less Than Wives: The Role of Roman Concubinae in Light of Their Funerary Monuments". Papers of the British School at Rome. 88: 151–184. doi:10.1017/S0068246220000057.
- Stocquart, Emile (March 1907). Sherman, Charles Phineas (ed.). "Marriage in Roman law". Yale Law Journal. 16 (5). Translated by Bierkan, Andrew T.: 303–327. doi:10.2307/785389. JSTOR 785389.
- Strong, Anise K. (2016). Prostitutes and Matrons in the Roman World. Cambridge University Press.
- Treggiari, Susan (1981a). "Contubernales in CIL VI". Phoenix. 35 (1). CAC: 42–69. doi:10.2307/1087137. JSTOR 1087137.
- Treggiari, Susan (1981b). "Concubinae". Papers of the British School at Rome. 49: 59–81. doi:10.1017/S0068246200008473.
- Treggiari, Susan (1991). Roman Marriage: "Iusti Coniuges" from the Time of Cicero to the Time of Ulpian. Oxford University Press.
- Watson, Alan (1987). Roman Slave Law. Johns Hopkins University Press.
- Williams, Kathryn F. (2006). "Pliny and the Murder of Larcius Macedo". Classical Journal. 101 (4): 409–424. JSTOR 30038018.
