= Ingenui =

Ingenui (singular ingenuus or feminine ingenua) was a legal description of persons who were born free in ancient Rome, as distinguished from free people who had once been slaves (liberti or libertae). Ingenuitas was the abstract noun for this status.

Free men were either ingenui or libertini. Ingenui indicated free men who were born free. Libertini were men who were manumitted from legal slavery. Although freedmen were not ingenui, the sons of libertini were ingenui. A libertinus could not by adoption become ingenuus. If a female slave (ancilla) was pregnant and was manumitted before she gave birth to the child, that child was born free and therefore was ingenuus. In other cases, also, the law favored the claim of free birth and consequently of ingenuitas. If a man's ingenuitas was a matter in dispute, the dispute could be heard by a judicium ingenuitatis, a court to determine status with regard to patronal rights.

The words ingenuus and libertinus are often opposed to one another, and the title of freeman (liber), which would comprehend libertinus, is sometimes limited by the addition of ingenuus. According to Cincius, in his work on Comitia, quoted by Festus, those who in his time were called ingenui were originally called patricii, which is interpreted by some scholars such as Carl Wilhelm Göttling to mean that Gentiles were originally called ingenui also, an interpretation that is the subject of some dispute. Others interpret the passage to mean that originally the name ingenuus did not exist and that the word patricius was sufficient to indicate a Roman citizen by birth. The passage from Cincius refers, under this interpretation, to a time when there were no Roman citizens except patricii, and the definition of ingenuus, if it had then been in use, would have been a sufficient definition of a patricius. But the word ingenuus was introduced, in the sense here stated, at a later time for the purpose of indicating a citizen by birth specifically. Thus, in the speech of Appius Claudius Crassus, he contrasts with persons of patrician descent, "Unus Quiritium quilibet, duobus ingenuis ortus."

Further, the definition of Gentilis by Scaevola shows that a man might be ingenuus and yet not gentilis, for he might be the son of a freedman; this is consistent with Livy. If Cincius meant his proposition to be comprehensive, the proposition is this: All (now) ingenui comprehend all (then) patricii; which is untrue.

Under the Roman Empire, ingenuitas, or the Jura Ingenuitatis, might be acquired by imperial favor; that is, a person not ingenuus by birth could be made so by the sovereign power. A freedman who had obtained the Jus Annulorum Aureorum, was considered ingenuus, but this did not interfere with the patronal rights. The natalibus restitutio was a decree in which the princeps gave to a libertinus the rights and status of ingenuus; it was a form of proceeding that involved the theory of the original freedom of all mankind, for the libertinus was restored not to the state in which he had been born but to his supposed original state of freedom. In this case, the patron lost his patronal rights as a necessary consequence, if the fiction were to have its full effect. It seems that questions as to a man's ingenuitas were common at Rome.
