= Perugia =

Comune in Umbria, Italy

- Comune
- Comune di Perugia
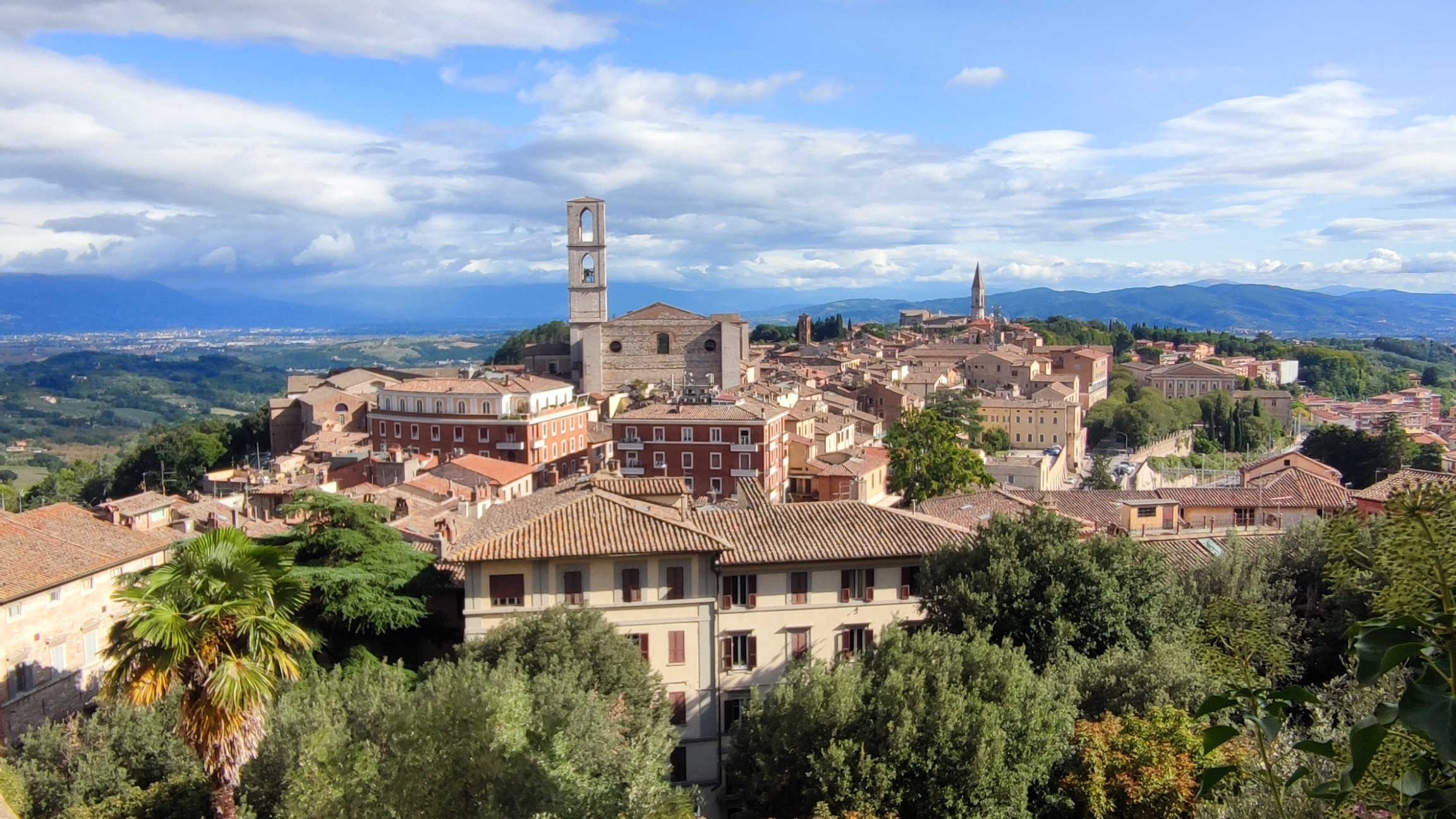
- View of Perugia

- Flag Coat of arms

- Location within Umbria Location within Italy Location within Europe
- Coordinates: 43°6′44″N 12°23′20″E
- Country: Italy
- Region: Umbria
- Province: Perugia (PG)
- Frazioni: See list

Government
  - Mayor: Vittoria Ferdinandi (Ind.)

Area
  - Total: 449.51 km^{2} (173.56 sq mi)
- Elevation: 493 m (1,617 ft)

Population (2026)
  - Total: 162,384
  - Density: 361.25/km^{2} (935.62/sq mi)
- Demonym: Perugino
- Time zone: UTC+1 (CET)
  - Summer (DST): UTC+2 (CEST)
- Postal code: 06100
- Dialing code: 075
- Patron saint: St. Constantius; St. Herculanus; St. Lawrence
- Saint day: 29 January
- Website: Official website

Perugia (/pəˈruːdʒə/ pə-ROO-jə, US also /-dʒiə, peɪˈ-/ -jee-ə, pay-; Italian: [peˈruːdʒa]; Latin: Perusia) is the capital city of Umbria and the province of Perugia in central Italy, crossed by the River Tiber. The city is located about 164 km (102 mi) north of Rome and 148 km (92 mi) southeast of Florence. It covers a high hilltop and part of the valleys around the area. With a population of 162,384, it is the 23rd-largest city in Italy.

The history of Perugia dates back to the Etruscan period, with Perugia serving as one of the main Etruscan cities.

The city is also known as a university town, with the University of Perugia founded in 1308, the University for Foreigners, and some smaller colleges such as the Academy of Fine Arts "Pietro Vannucci" (Italian: Accademia di Belle Arti "Pietro Vannucci") public athenaeum founded in 1573, the Perugia University Institute of Linguistic Mediation for translators and interpreters, and the Music Conservatory of Perugia founded in 1788.

Perugia is also a well-known cultural and artistic centre of Italy. The city hosts multiple annual festivals and events, such as the Umbria Jazz Festival in July, and the International Journalism Festival in April, and is associated with multiple notable people in the arts.

Painter Pietro Vannucci, nicknamed Perugino, was a native of Città della Pieve, near Perugia. He decorated the local Sala del Cambio with a series of frescoes, and eight of his pictures may be seen in the National Gallery of Umbria.

Perugino may have been the teacher of Raphael, the great Renaissance artist who produced five paintings in Perugia (today no longer in the city) and one fresco. Another painter, Pinturicchio, lived in Perugia. Galeazzo Alessi is the most famous architect from Perugia.

The city's symbol is the griffin, which can be seen in the form of plaques and statues on buildings around the city. It is also the symbol of the local football club A.C. Perugia, who have previously played in the Serie A. Having never been Italian champions, the club went unbeaten in the 1978–79 season despite finishing second in the championship.

== History ==
=== Umbrians and Etruscans ===
Perugia was an Umbrian settlement but first appears in written history as Perusia, one of the 12 confederate cities of Etruria; it was first mentioned in Q. Fabius Pictor's account, used by Livy, of the expedition carried out against the Etruscan League by Fabius Maximus Rullianus in 310 or 309 BC. At that time a thirty-year indutiae (truce) was agreed upon; however, in 295 Perusia took part in the Third Samnite War and was forced, with Volsinii and Arretium (Arezzo), to sue for peace in the following year.

=== Roman period ===
In 216 and 205 BC, Perugia assisted Rome in the Second Punic War, but afterward it is not mentioned until 41–40 BC, when Lucius Antonius took refuge there, and was defeated by Octavian after a long siege, and its senators sent to their deaths. A number of lead bullets used by slingers have been found in and around the city. The city was burnt, we are told, with the exception of the temples of Vulcan and Juno—the massive Etruscan terrace-walls, naturally, can hardly have suffered at all—and the town, with the territory for a mile round, was allowed to be occupied by whoever chose. It must have been rebuilt almost at once, for several bases for statues exist, inscribed Augusto sacr(um) Perusia restituta; but it did not become a colonia, until 251–253 AD, when it was resettled as Colonia Vibia Augusta Perusia, under the emperor Trebonianus Gallus.

=== Early Middle Ages ===
It is hardly mentioned except by the geographers until it was the only city in Umbria to resist Totila and the Ostrogoths, who captured it and laid the city waste in 547, after a long siege, apparently after the city's Byzantine garrison evacuated. Negotiations with the besieging forces fell to the city's bishop, Herculanus, as representative of the townspeople. Totila is said to have ordered the bishop to be flayed and beheaded. St. Herculanus (Sant'Ercolano) later became the city's patron saint.

=== Middle Ages ===
In the Lombard period, Perugia is spoken of as one of the principal cities of Tuscia. In the 9th century, with the consent of Charlemagne and Louis the Pious, it passed under the popes; but by the 11th century, its commune was asserting itself, and for many centuries the city continued to maintain an independent life, warring against many of the neighbouring lands and cities—Foligno, Assisi, Spoleto, Todi, Siena, Arezzo, etc. In 1186, Henry VI, rex romanorum and future emperor, granted diplomatic recognition to the consular government of the city; afterward, Pope Innocent III, whose major aim was to give state dignity to the dominions having been constituting the patrimony of St. Peter, acknowledged the validity of the imperial statement and recognised the established civic practices as having the force of law.

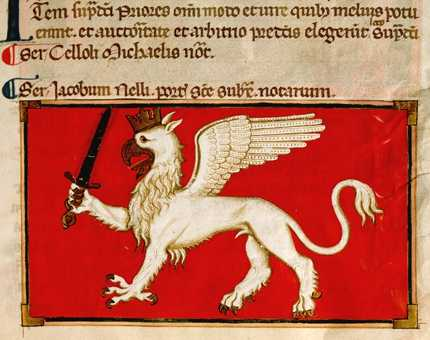
Perugia griffin, in a medieval Latin document

On various occasions, the popes found asylum from the tumults of Rome within its walls, and it was the meetingplace of five conclaves (Perugia Papacy), including those that elected Honorius III (1216), Clement IV (1265), Celestine V (1294), and Clement V (1305); the papal presence was characterised by a pacificatory rule between the internal rivalries. But Perugia had no mind simply to subserve the papal interests and never accepted papal sovereignty; the city used to exercise a jurisdiction over the members of the clergy, moreover in 1282, Perugia was excommunicated due to a new military offensive against the Ghibellines regardless of a papal prohibition. On the other hand, side by side with the 13th-century bronze griffin of Perugia above the door of the Palazzo dei Priori stands, as a Guelphic emblem, the lion, and Perugia remained loyal for the most part to the Guelph party in the struggles of Guelphs and Ghibellines, but this dominant tendency was rather an anti-Germanic and Italian political strategy. The Angevin presence in Italy appeared to offer a counterpoise to papal powers; in 1319, Perugia declared the Angevin Saint Louis of Toulouse "Protector of the city's sovereignty and of the Palazzo of its Priors" and set his figure among the other patron saints above the rich doorway of the Palazzo dei Priori. Midway through the 14th century Bartholus of Sassoferrato, who was a renowned jurist, asserted that Perugia was dependent upon neither imperial nor papal support. In 1347, at the time of Rienzi's unfortunate enterprise in reviving the Roman republic, Perugia sent 10 ambassadors to pay him honour, and when papal legates sought to coerce it by foreign soldiers, or to exact contributions, they met with vigorous resistance, which broke into open warfare with Pope Urban V in 1369; in 1370, the noble party reached an agreement signing the treaty of Bologna, and Perugia was forced to accept a papal legate; however. the vicar-general of the Papal States, Gérard du Puy, Abbot of Marmoutier and nephew of Gregory IX, was expelled by a popular uprising in 1375, and his fortification of Porta Sole was razed to the ground.

==== The lordships of Perugia ====
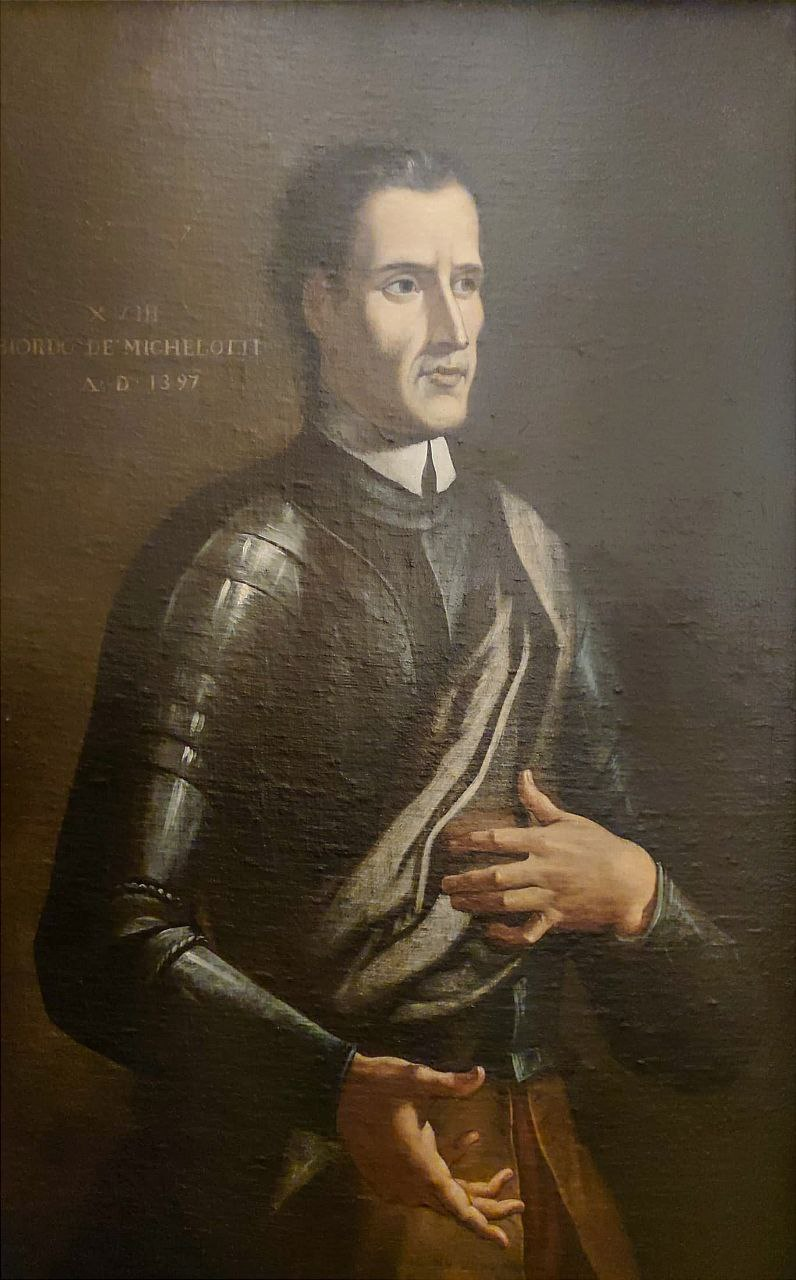
Biordo Michelotti, Lord of Perugia from 1393 to 1398

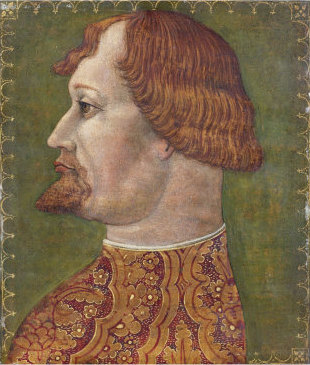
Gian Galeazzo Visconti, Lord of Perugia from 1400 to 1402

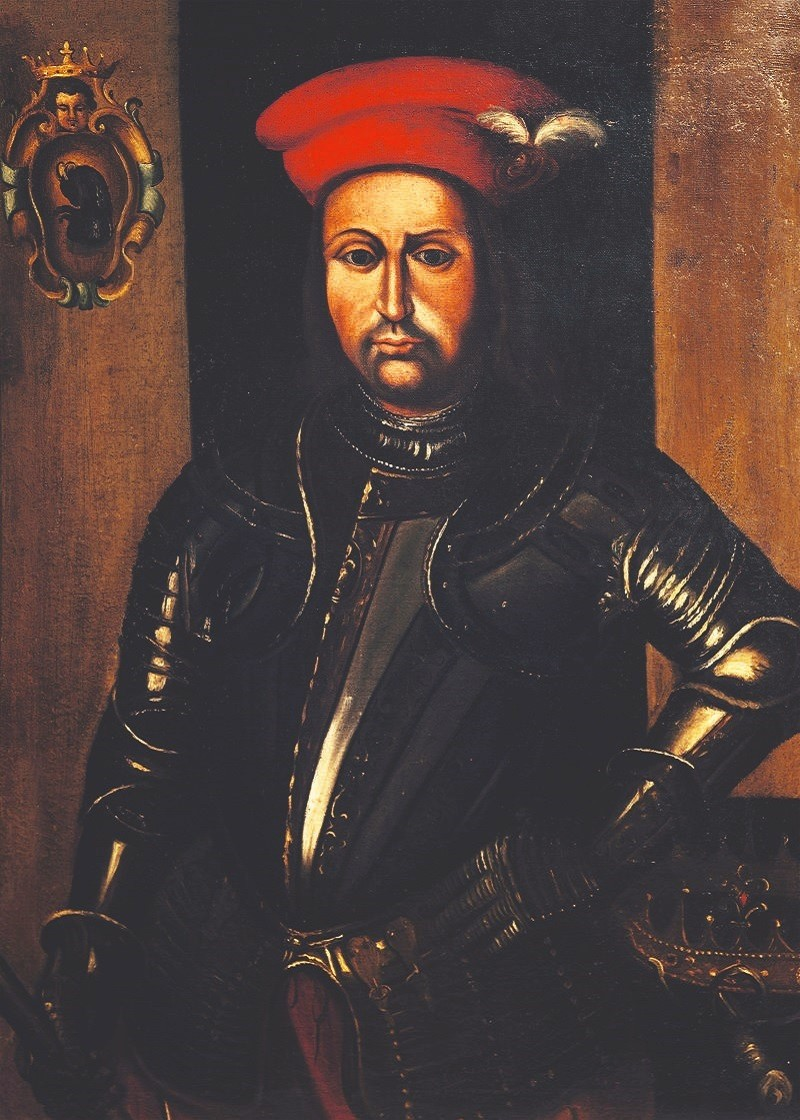
Braccio da Montone

===== Biordo Michelotti (1393–1398) =====
On August 5, 1393, the condottiero (mercenary captain) Biordo Michelotti, a member of the popular faction known as the Raspanti, made his triumphant entry into Perugia, and the general council appointed him as the "knight of the people" of Perugia and the "general captain" of the militias. A special commission of twenty-five citizens was tasked with banishing one hundred and fifty noblemen, while Biordo decided the return of noble individuals who were not considered guilty of sedition. Among the exiled noblemen was Braccio da Montone, one of the most skilled military leaders of the time, who vowed not to seek "any pact or agreement with the Raspanti of Perugia."

It was precisely against the exiled nobles, especially Braccio da Montone, the soul and leader of the noble movement in exile, that the government of the Raspanti directed its efforts after the turmoil of 1393. Holding virtually all power, Biordo was recognized as the first "lord of Perugia," even though during his short rule (1393–1398), he left intact the priory and all existing communal institutions, focusing solely on extending his dominion beyond Perugia. After the splendid marriage with Giovanna Orsini, Biordo and his bride took residence in the Porta Sole palace, but on March 10, 1398, Biordo fell victim to a conspiracy orchestrated by Francesco Guidalotti, abbot of San Pietro. In their new residence, Michelotti was stabbed by Giovanni and Annibaldo, brothers of the abbot of San Pietro.

===== Gian Galeazzo Visconti (1400–1402) =====
The death of Michelotti removed an important point of reference, and factions threatened the stability within and outside the walls. Meanwhile, the twenty-five worked diligently to find an institution that could protect the city and alleviate a very high debt. The people's demands for independence were no longer as urgent, and in the 15th century, the common belief was that they had to accept a ruler or master capable of providing the minimum requirements for survival. The choice fell on the Duchy of Milan, and on January 21, 1400, Gian Galeazzo Visconti was proclaimed the lord of Perugia by the voluntary submission of the city. In response to the delegation of the ten representatives that Perugia had sent him, he canceled the debt of the Perugians. His lordship was short-lived, and on October 3, 1402, Visconti passed away.

===== Braccio da Montone (1416–1424) =====
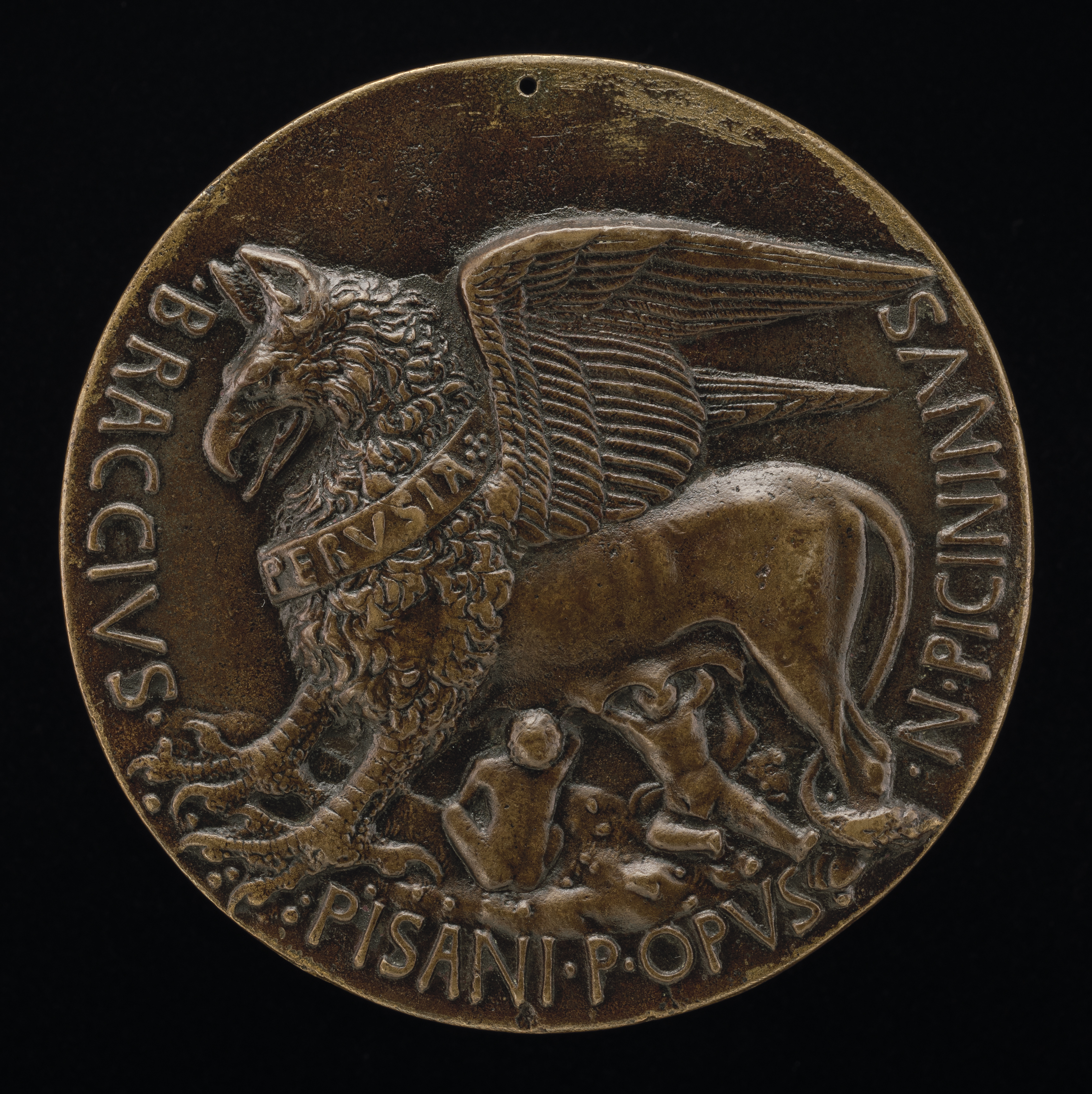
This medal (c. 1441) by Pisanello depicts the Perugian griffin suckling Braccio da Montone and Niccolò Piccinino in the manner of the Roman She-Wolf.

In 1408, Ladislao D'Angiò Durazzo, the King of Naples, successfully captured Perugia and intended to have it administered by Braccio Fortebracci. However, Braccio vehemently opposed this idea and declined the offer. Nonetheless, in 1411, Perugia surrendered to the King of Naples, opting to be ruled by a foreigner rather than a nobleman. Braccio viewed this as a profound betrayal by his fellow citizens and fled. In November 1410, Braccio besieged Perugia but failed to capture it due to the city's resistance. He defeated pursuing troops and terrorized surrounding towns. In April 1416, he returned with a large army and attacked Perugia. After a victory in July, Perugia surrendered, marking the end of the Raspanti government. Braccio ruled moderately. In 1417, he entered Rome and proclaimed himself Defender of the City, later returning to Umbria. After conflicts and military successes, he was appointed Vicar by the Pope. Upon returning to Perugia, he undertook public works. He left for Bologna, returned, and went to Calabria. When denied entry to L'Aquila, he laid siege but faced opposition from the Pope and Queen. A league attacked him near Pescara in 1424, leading to his death. His son later buried him in Perugia with honors. During the rule of Braccio Fortebracci da Montone, significant public works were undertaken, such as Braccio's residence in the square, of which only the loggias remain, or the "Sopramuro," to which Braccio had another series of supporting structures built: the "briglie di Braccio."

=== The Renaissance ===
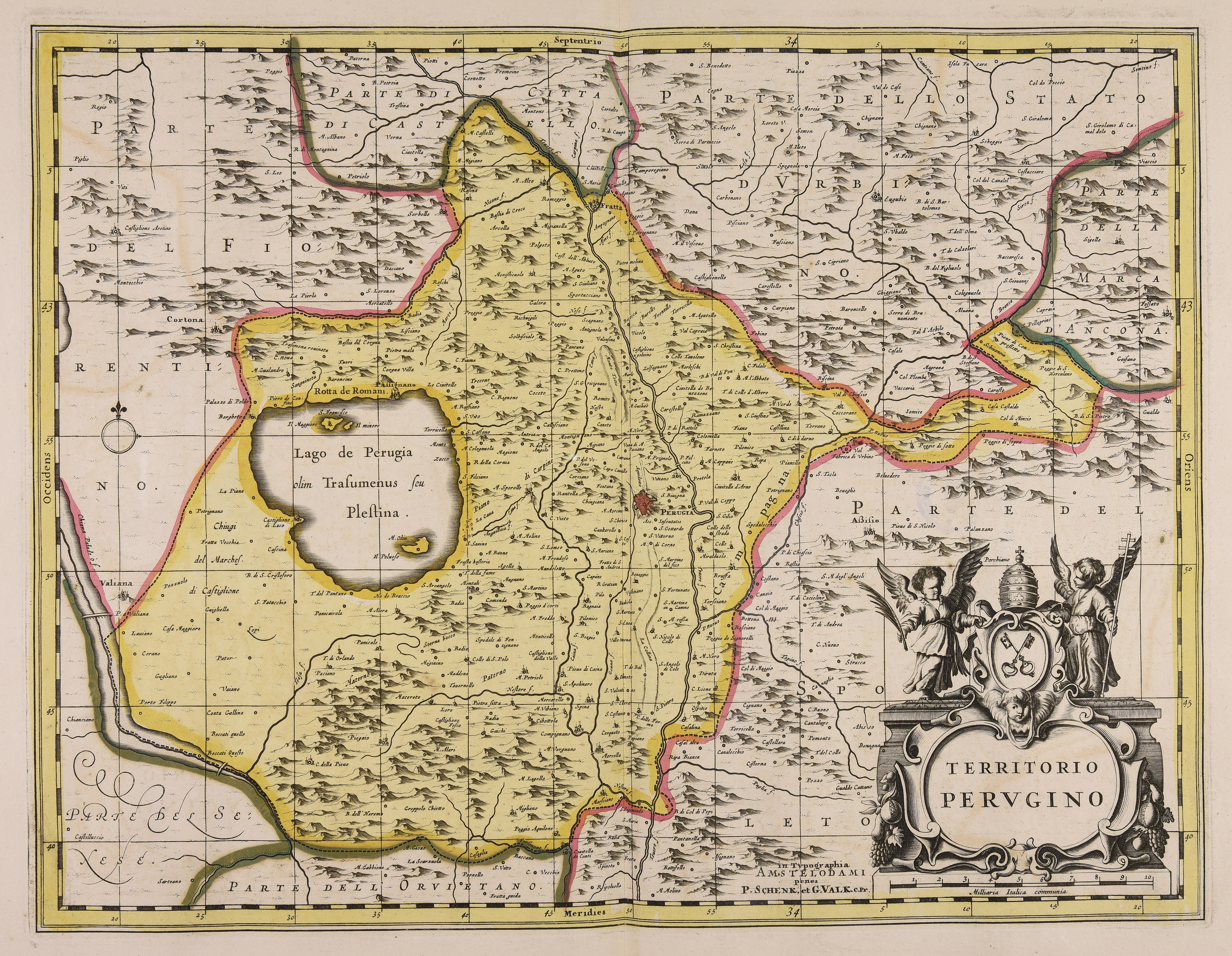
The territory once extended from Montecastelli in the north to Marsciano in the south, Vaiano in the west, and Poggio Sant'Ercolano in the east

==== Baglioni family (1438–1540) ====
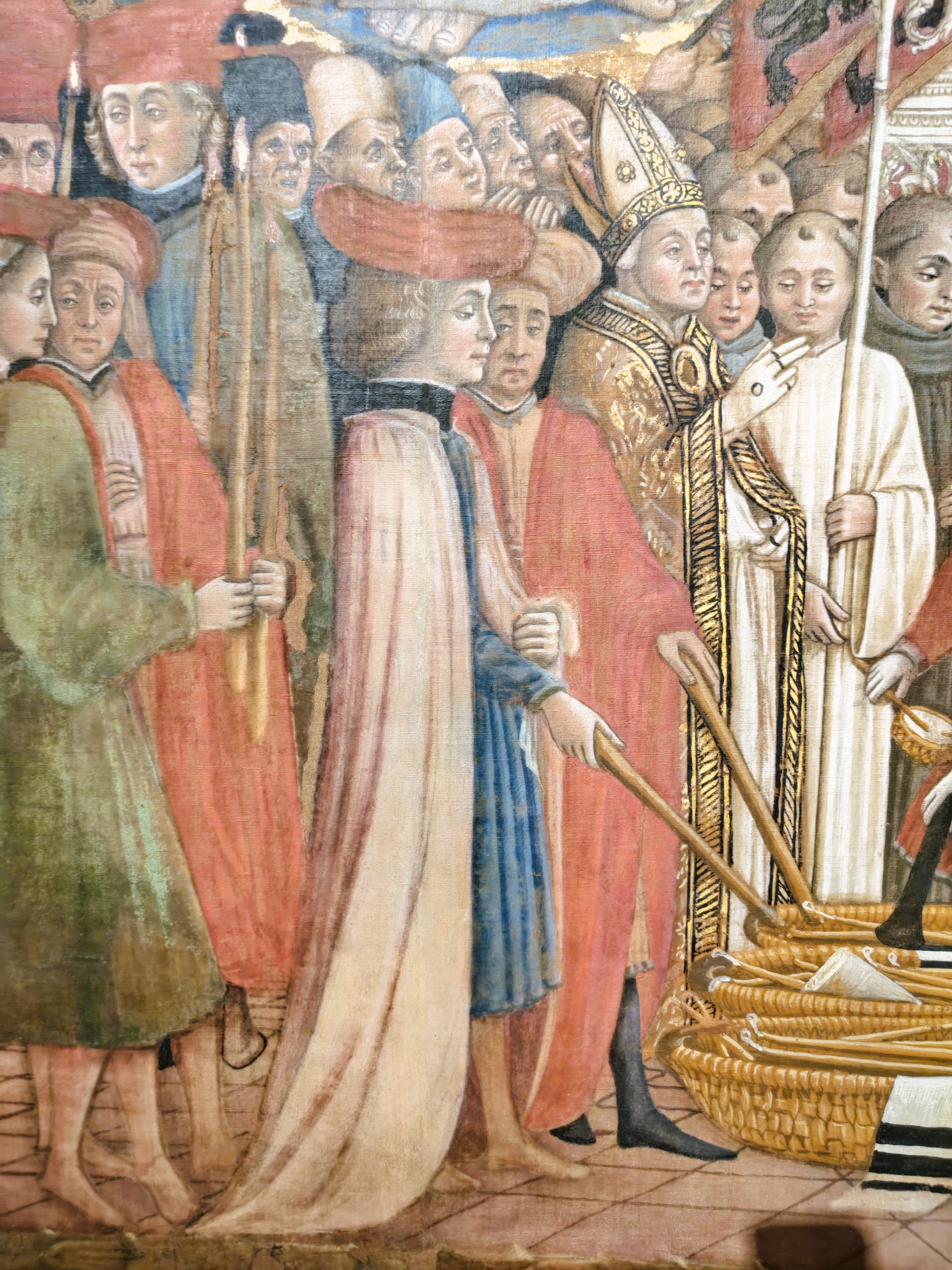
Braccio Baglioni, Lord of Perugia from 1438 to 1479

During the period 1438–1479, the Baglioni family held a covert lordship over Perugia, which was not characterized by complete control of civic powers. Braccio I Baglioni, leveraging his position as captain of the militias of the Holy See and being the nephew of Braccio da Montone, the previous Lord of the City, exerted an influence over Perugia that quickly established its supremacy. During those years, the Umbrian center experienced a period of flourishing growth as the Baglioni implemented a policy of expansion and beautification of the city, including the construction of new roads and palaces.Between 1429 and 1433, the Palazzo dei Priori was expanded and new churches and private chapels were built. The patronage of the Baglioni attracted artists such as Piero della Francesca, Pinturicchio, and Raphael, making Perugia an important artistic center.

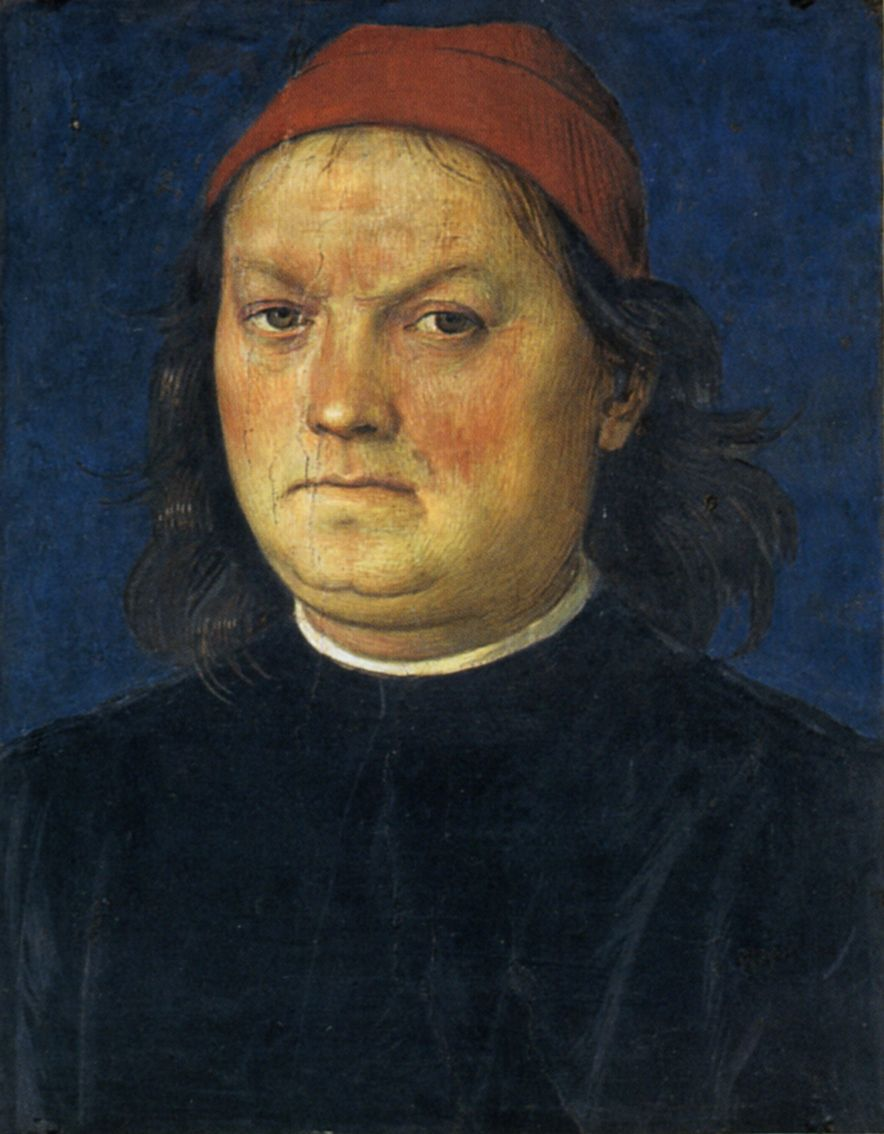
Pietro Perugino

During this time, Perugia became a significant hub of the Umbrian Renaissance, marked by the production of the eight panels depicting the life of Saint Bernardino, a collaborative effort probably involving Pinturicchio, Piermatteo d'Amelia, and the young Perugino, among others, commonly referred to as the "1473 workshop." Pietro "Perugino" Vannucci created numerous works in the city, including a cycle of frescoes in the Hall of Audiences of the Collegio del Cambio.

Additionally, the Baglioni family commissioned the construction of an imposing aristocratic palace as their private residence, of which only the part incorporated into the Rocca Paolina remains today. The palace was decorated by Domenico Veneziano with a painting cycle depicting noble Perugian families and great military leaders of the past.

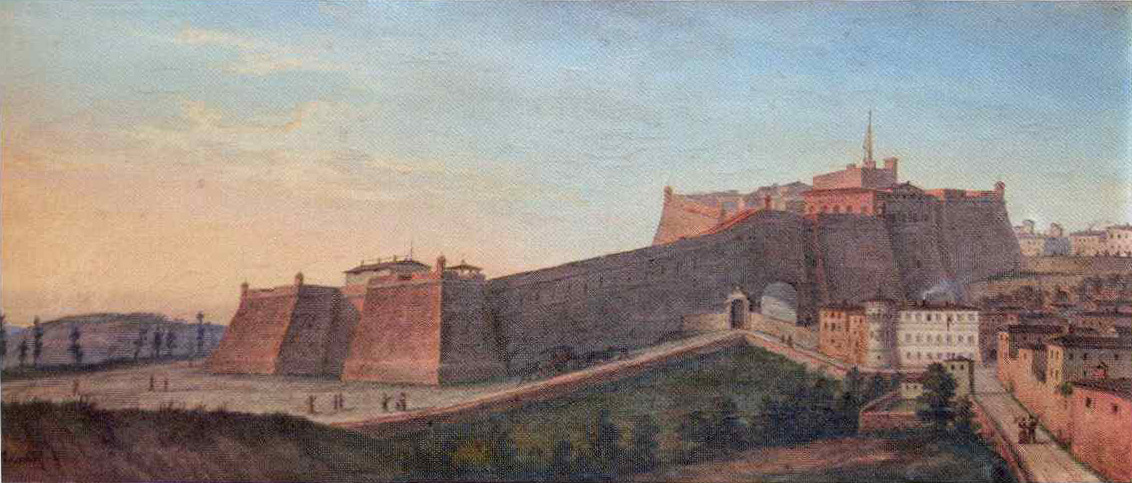
Rocca Paolina, view of the fortress in a 19th century painting

Following mutual atrocities of the Oddi and the Baglioni families, power was at last concentrated in the Baglioni, who though they had no legal position, defied all other authority, though their bloody internal squabbles culminated in the Red Wedding massacre, 14 July 1500. Gian Paolo Baglioni was lured to Rome in 1520 and beheaded by Leo X; and in 1540, Rodolfo, who had slain a papal legate, was defeated by Pier Luigi Farnese, and the city, captured and plundered by his soldiery, was deprived of its privileges.

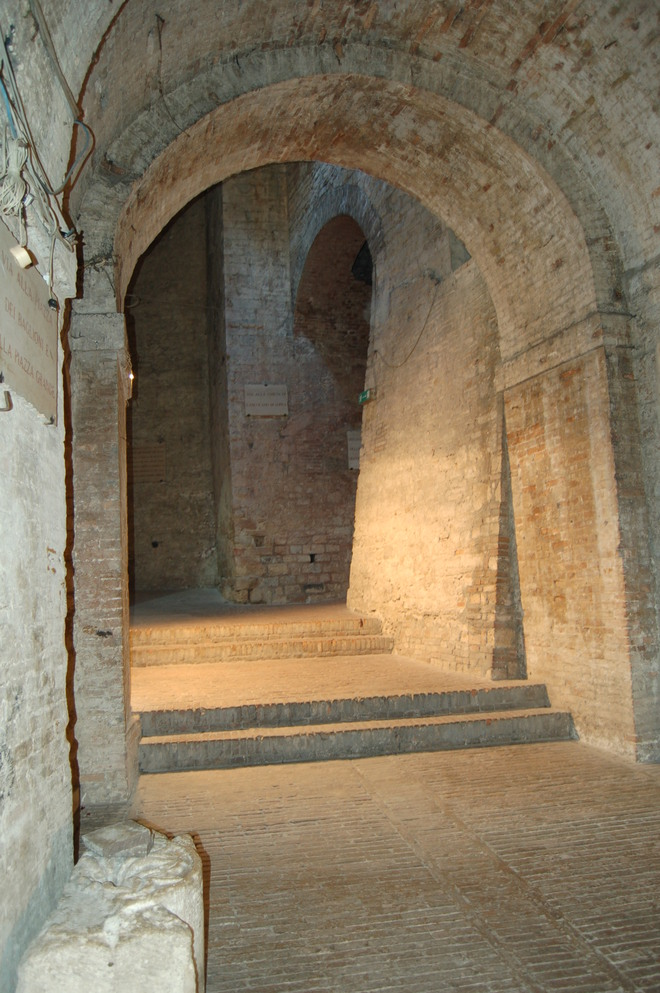
In the Rocca Paolina

A citadel known as the Rocca Paolina, after the name of Pope Paul III, was built, to designs of Antonio da Sangallo the Younger "ad coercendam Perusinorum audaciam."

In 1797, the city was conquered by French troops. On 4 February 1798, the Tiberina Republic was formed, with Perugia as capital, and the French tricolour as flag. In 1799, the Tiberina Republic merged to the Roman Republic.

In 1832, 1838, and 1854, Perugia was hit by earthquakes. Following the collapse of the Roman republic of 1848–49, when the Rocca was in part demolished, it was seized in May 1849 by the Austrians. In June 1859, the inhabitants rebelled against the temporal authority of the pope and established a provisional government, but the insurrection was quashed bloodily by Pius IX's troops. In September 1860, the city was united finally, along with the rest of Umbria, as part of the Kingdom of Italy. During World War II, the city suffered only some damage and was liberated by the British 8th army on 20 June 1944.

== Geography ==
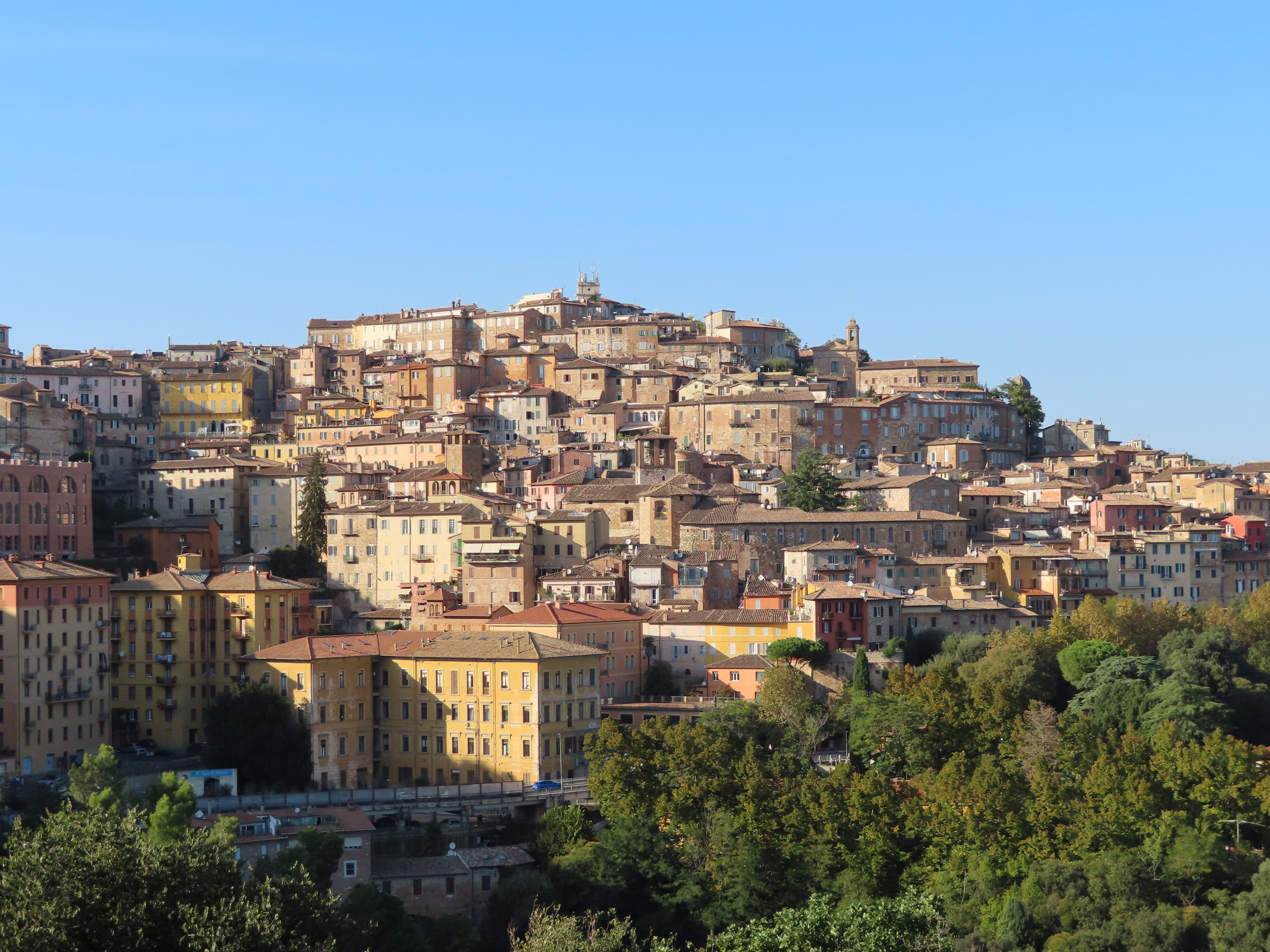
Perugia seen from the national archaeological museum of Umbria

Perugia is the capital city of the region of Umbria. Cities' distances from Perugia: Assisi 19 km (12 mi), Siena 102 km (63 mi), Florence 145 km (90 mi), Rome 164 km (102 mi).

=== Climate ===
Though Perugia is located in the central part of Italy, the city experiences a humid subtropical climate (Köppen climate classification Cfa) similar to much of Northern Italy due to its inland location and the diverse, hilly topography of Umbria. Typically, summers are warm to hot and humid, while winters are cold with occasional snowfall. The climate in this area has mild differences between highs and lows, with adequate rainfall year-round.

Climate data for Perugia (1991–2020 normals, extremes 1967–present)
| Month | Jan | Feb | Mar | Apr | May | Jun | Jul | Aug | Sep | Oct | Nov | Dec | Year |
|---|---|---|---|---|---|---|---|---|---|---|---|---|---|
| Record high °C (°F) | 18.0 (64.4) | 22.0 (71.6) | 25.6 (78.1) | 29.7 (85.5) | 35.0 (95.0) | 39.0 (102.2) | 39.6 (103.3) | 41.0 (105.8) | 35.3 (95.5) | 32.0 (89.6) | 24.0 (75.2) | 20.0 (68.0) | 41.0 (105.8) |
| Mean daily maximum °C (°F) | 10.1 (50.2) | 11.8 (53.2) | 15.2 (59.4) | 18.5 (65.3) | 22.8 (73.0) | 27.6 (81.7) | 30.6 (87.1) | 30.9 (87.6) | 25.4 (77.7) | 20.5 (68.9) | 14.6 (58.3) | 10.3 (50.5) | 19.9 (67.7) |
| Daily mean °C (°F) | 5.5 (41.9) | 6.5 (43.7) | 9.4 (48.9) | 12.4 (54.3) | 16.6 (61.9) | 21.0 (69.8) | 23.6 (74.5) | 23.9 (75.0) | 19.4 (66.9) | 15.3 (59.5) | 10.2 (50.4) | 6.2 (43.2) | 14.2 (57.5) |
| Mean daily minimum °C (°F) | 1.0 (33.8) | 1.1 (34.0) | 3.6 (38.5) | 6.2 (43.2) | 10.5 (50.9) | 14.4 (57.9) | 16.6 (61.9) | 17.0 (62.6) | 13.5 (56.3) | 10.1 (50.2) | 5.9 (42.6) | 2.1 (35.8) | 8.5 (47.3) |
| Record low °C (°F) | −15.8 (3.6) | −17.0 (1.4) | −8.3 (17.1) | −6.0 (21.2) | −1.9 (28.6) | 5.2 (41.4) | 6.9 (44.4) | 6.0 (42.8) | 3.6 (38.5) | −1.4 (29.5) | −8.2 (17.2) | −14.8 (5.4) | −17.0 (1.4) |
| Average precipitation mm (inches) | 52.7 (2.07) | 56.8 (2.24) | 54.0 (2.13) | 72.0 (2.83) | 75.6 (2.98) | 69.9 (2.75) | 37.4 (1.47) | 49.7 (1.96) | 87.6 (3.45) | 85.7 (3.37) | 94.7 (3.73) | 68.4 (2.69) | 804.5 (31.67) |
| Average precipitation days (≥ 1.0 mm) | 7.1 | 7.1 | 7.0 | 8.7 | 8.4 | 7.1 | 4.7 | 4.9 | 6.5 | 7.7 | 8.4 | 7.8 | 85.4 |
| Average relative humidity (%) | 83 | 77 | 73 | 74 | 74 | 71 | 68 | 69 | 71 | 76 | 82 | 85 | 75 |
Source 1: Istituto Superiore per la Protezione e la Ricerca Ambientale
Source 2: Servizio Meteorologico (precipitation 1971–2000, humidity 1968–1990) Temperature estreme in Toscana (extremes)

== Demographics ==
Historical population
| Year | Pop. | ±% |
|---|---|---|
| 1861 | 42,515 | — |
| 1871 | 49,507 | +16.4% |
| 1881 | 50,718 | +2.4% |
| 1901 | 60,822 | +19.9% |
| 1911 | 66,277 | +9.0% |
| 1921 | 72,404 | +9.2% |
| 1931 | 77,352 | +6.8% |
| 1936 | 82,407 | +6.5% |
| 1951 | 95,310 | +15.7% |
| 1961 | 112,511 | +18.0% |
| 1971 | 129,921 | +15.5% |
| 1981 | 142,348 | +9.6% |
| 1991 | 144,732 | +1.7% |
| 2001 | 149,125 | +3.0% |
| 2011 | 162,449 | +8.9% |
| 2021 | 162,362 | −0.1% |
Source: ISTAT

As of 2026, the population is 162,384, of which 48.3% are male, and 51.7% are female. Minors make up 14.1% of the population, and seniors make up 26.1%.

=== Immigration ===
As of 2025, immigrants make up 16.0% of the population. The 5 largest foreign countries of birth are Albania, Romania, Morocco, Ecuador, and Ukraine.

== Administrative subdivisions ==
Perugia's municipality includes the villages and hamlets (Italian: frazioni) of:

- Bagnaia
- Bosco
- Capanne
- Casa del Diavolo
- Castel del Piano
- Cenerente
- Civitella Benazzone
- Civitella d'Arna
- Collestrada
- Colle Umberto I
- Cordigliano
- Colombella
- Farneto
- Ferro di Cavallo
- Fontignano
- Fratticiola Selvatica
- La Bruna
- La Cinella
- Lacugnano
- Lidarno
- Madonna Alta
- Migiana di Monte Tezio
- Monte Bagnolo
- Monte Corneo
- Montelaguardia
- Monte Petriolo
- Mugnano
- Olmo
- Parlesca
- Pianello
- Piccione
- Pila
- Pilonico Materno
- Piscille
- Ponte della Pietra
- Poggio delle Corti
- Ponte Felcino
- Ponte Pattoli
- Ponte Rio
- Ponte San Giovanni
- Ponte Valleceppi
- Prepo
- Pretola
- Ramazzano-Le Pulci
- Rancolfo
- Ripa
- Sant'Andrea delle Fratte
- Sant'Egidio
- Sant'Enea
- San Fortunato della Collina
- San Giovanni del Pantano
- Sant'Andrea d'Agliano
- Santa Lucia
- San Marco
- Santa Maria Rossa
- San Martino dei Colli
- San Martino in Campo
- San Martino in Colle
- San Sisto
- Solfagnano
- Villa Pitignano

Other localities are Boneggio, Canneto, Colle della Trinità, Monte Pulito, Montevile, Pieve di Campo, Montemalbe and Monte Morcino.

Collestrada, in the territory of the suburb of Ponte San Giovanni, saw a battle between the inhabitants of Perugia and Assisi in 1202.

== Sights ==
=== Churches ===
- Cathedral of S. Lorenzo
- San Pietro: late 16th-century church and abbey.
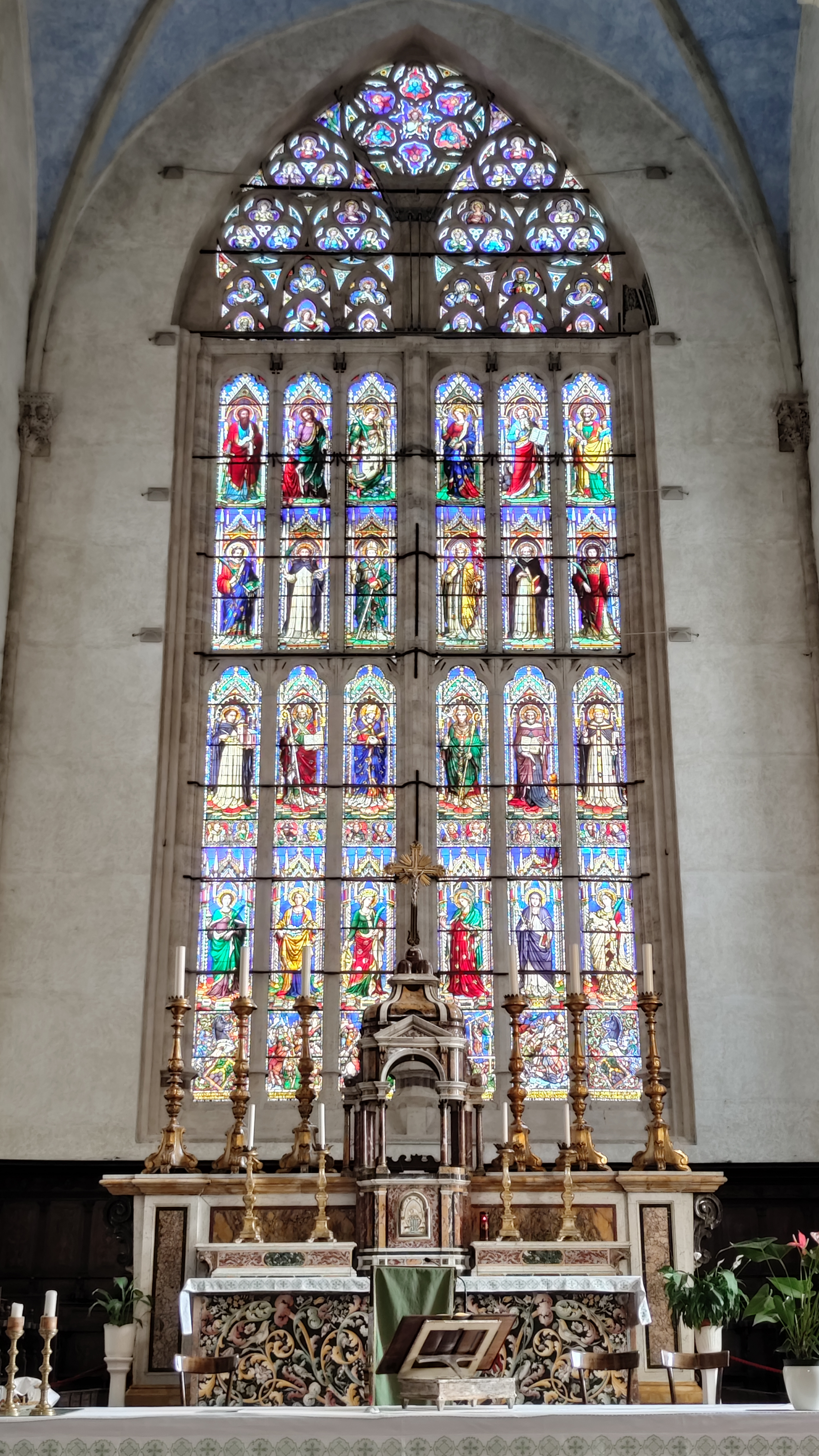
- The stained glass window of the Basilica of San Domenico (1411)
  San Domenico: Basilica church of the Dominican order, building began in 1394 and finished in 1458. Before 1234, this site housed markets and a horse fair. The exterior design attributed to Giovanni Pisano, while its interior redecorated in Baroque fashion by Carlo Maderno. The massive belfry was partially cut around the mid-16th century. The interior hosts the splendid tomb of Pope Benedict XI and a wooden choir from the Renaissance period. The 23 m × 8 m (75 ft × 26 ft) stained glass window of the Basilica of San Domenico is one of the largest in the world.
- Sant'Angelo, also called San Michele Arcangelo: small paleo-Christian church from the 5th–6th centuries. Sixteen antique columns frame circular layout recalling the Roman church of Santo Stefano Rotondo.
- Sant'Antonio Abate.
- San Bernardino: church with façade by Agostino di Duccio.
- San Ercolano: 14th-century church that resembles a polygonal tower. This church once had two floors. Its upper floor was demolished when the Rocca Paolina was built. Baroque interior decorations commissioned from 1607. The main altar has a sarcophagus found in 1609.
- Santa Giuliana: church and monastery founded by heir of a female monastery in 1253. In its later years, the church gained a reputation for dissoluteness. Later, the Napoleonic forces turned the church into a granary. Now, the church is a military hospital. The church, with a single nave, bears only traces of 13th century frescoes, which probably used to cover all of the walls. The cloister is a noteworthy example of mid-14th-century Cistercian architecture from Matteo Gattaponi. The upper part of the campanile is from the 13th century.
- San Bevignate: church of the Templar.
- Chiesa of San Prospero.
- Church of the Compagnia della Morte.
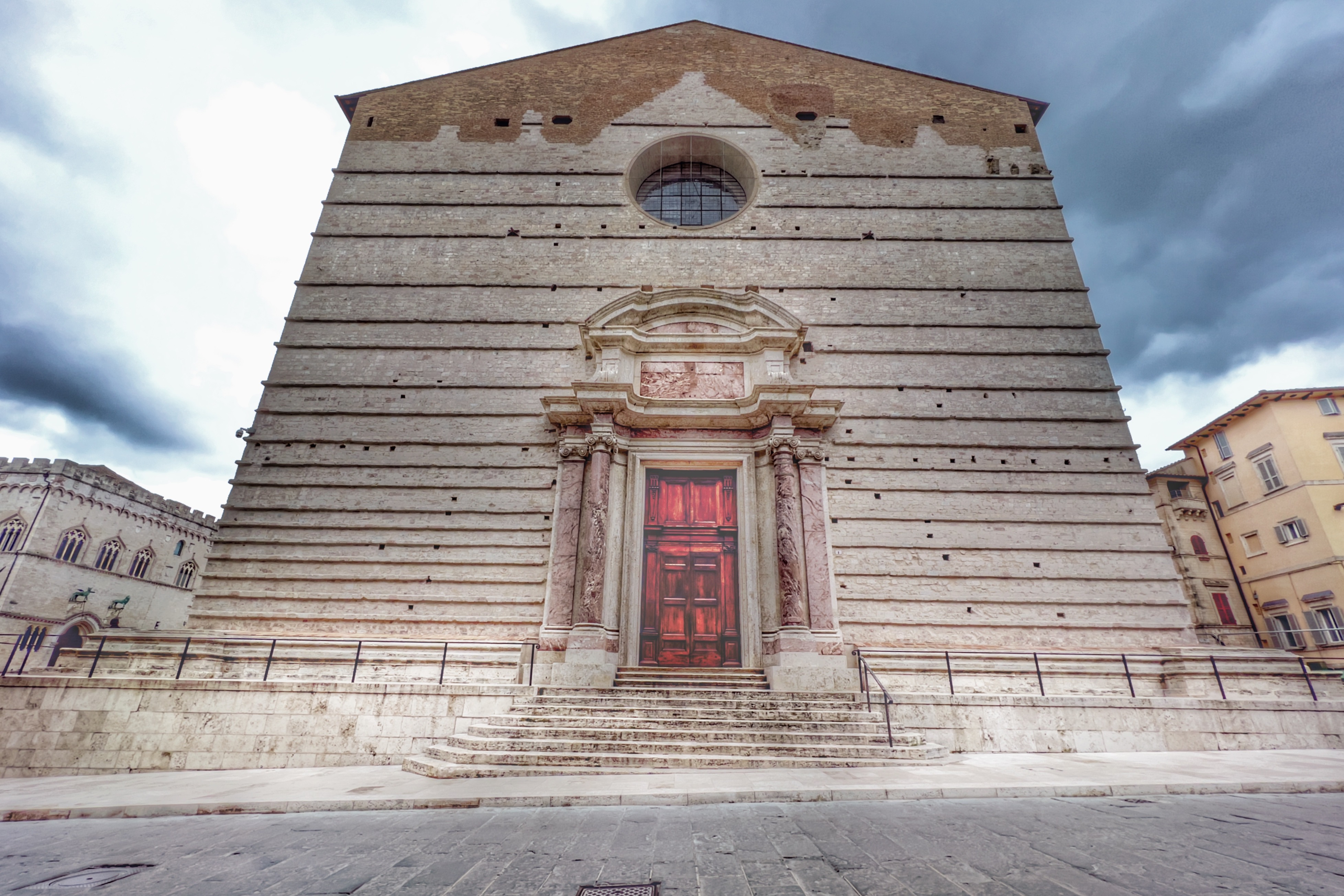
Cathedral of S. Lorenzo

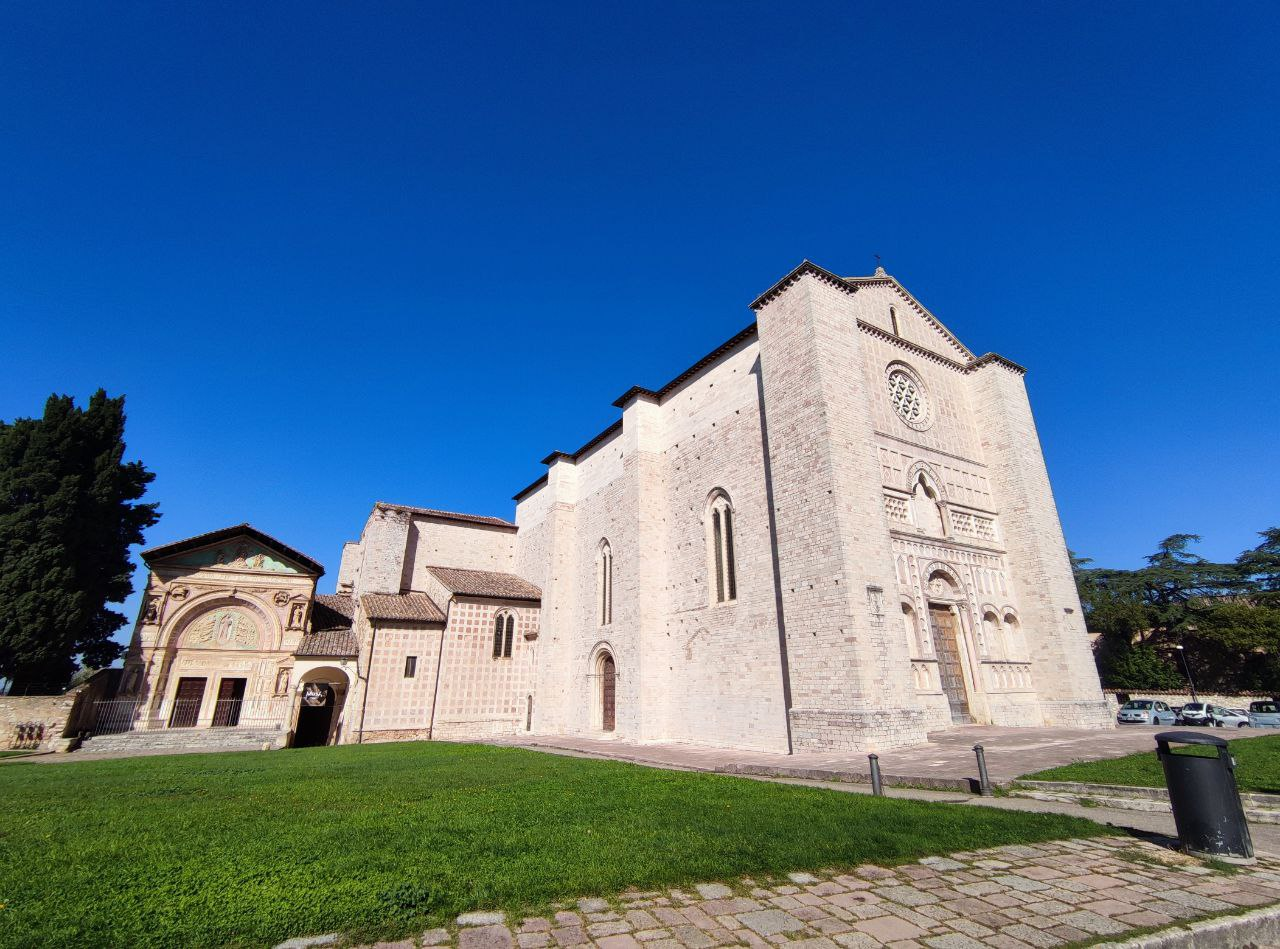
Deconsecrated church of San Francesco al Prato

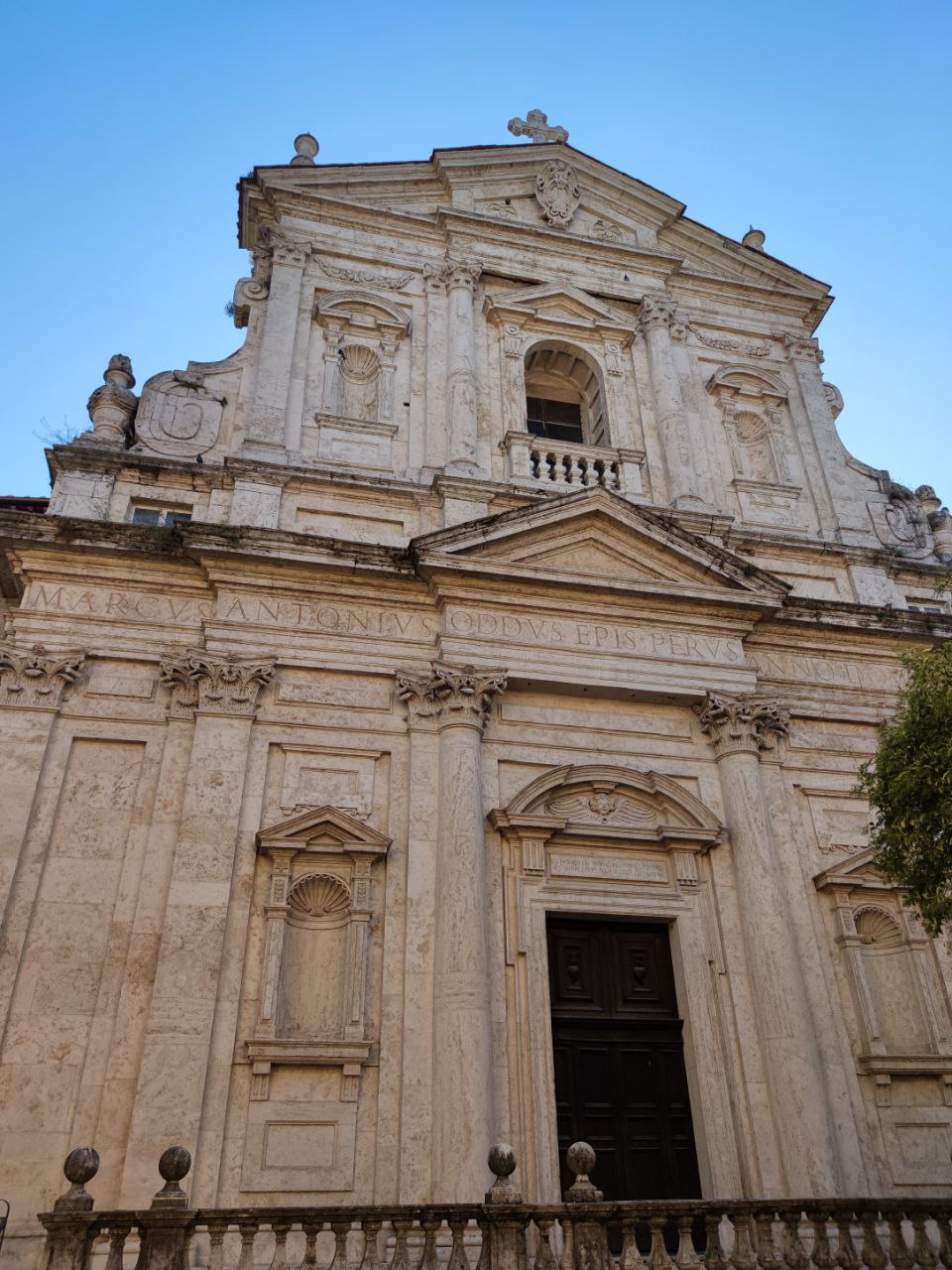
Baroque church of San Filippo Neri

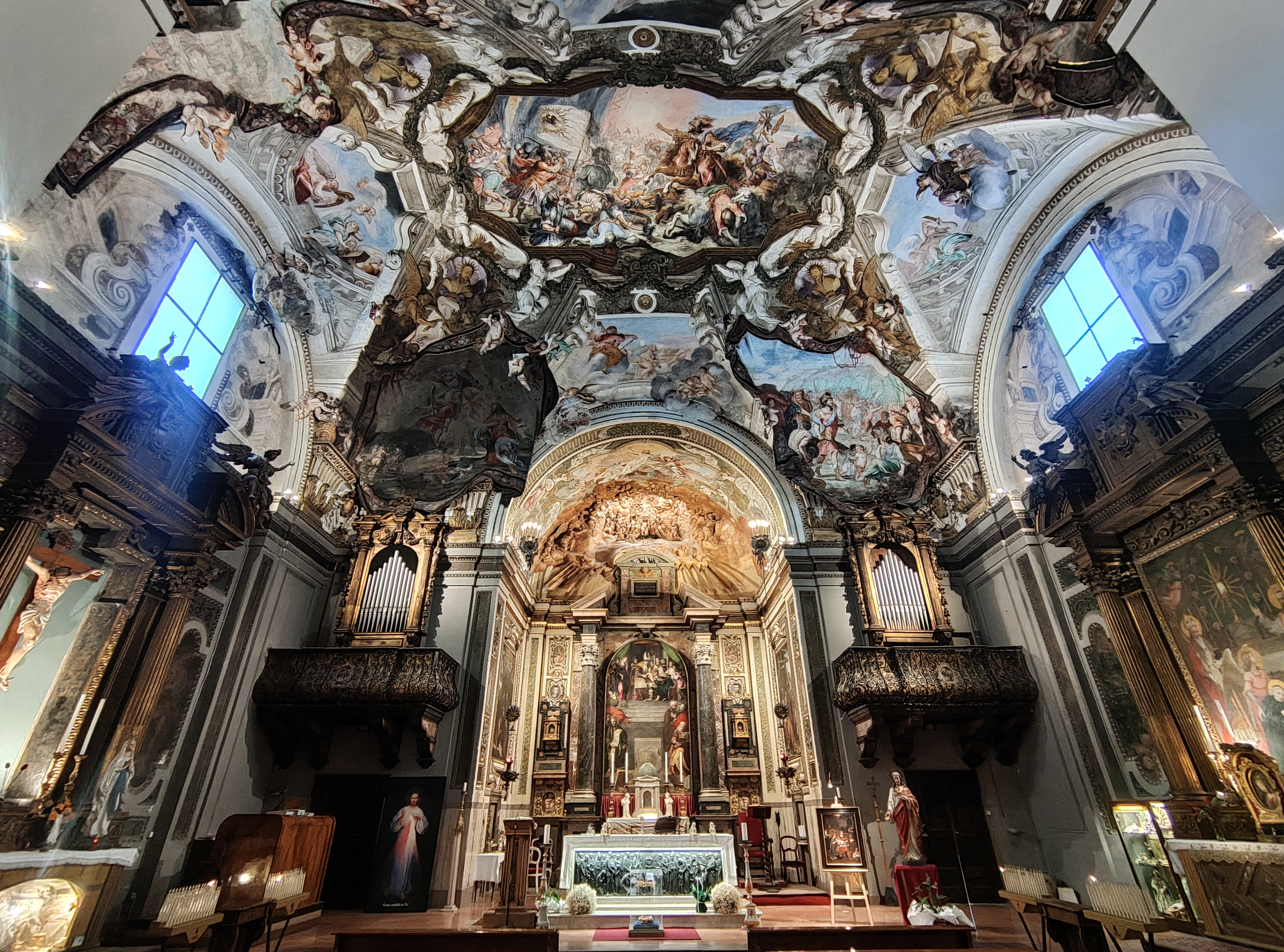
Presbytery overview of the church of Gesu, Perugia

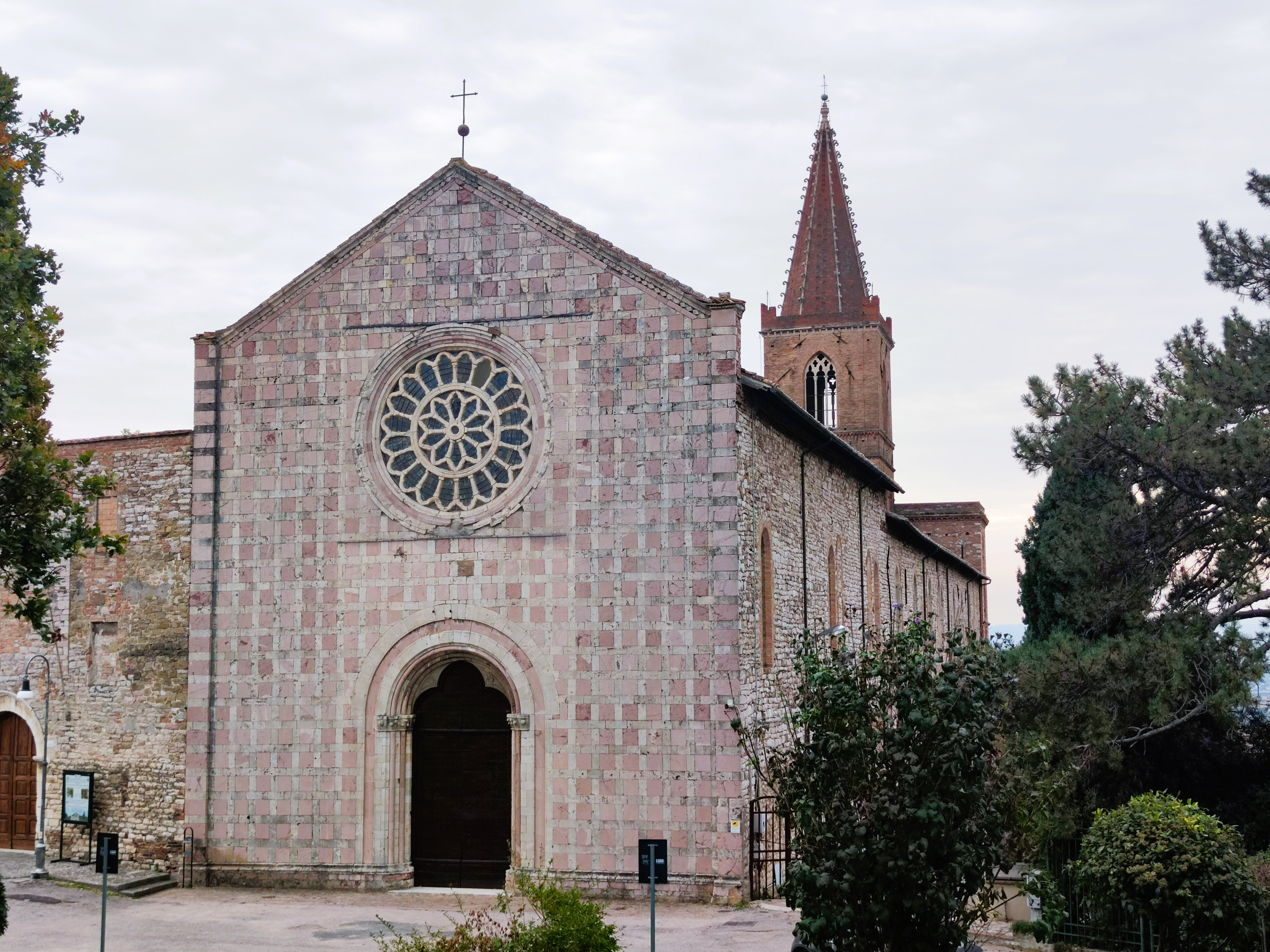
Cistercian monastery of Santa Giuliana

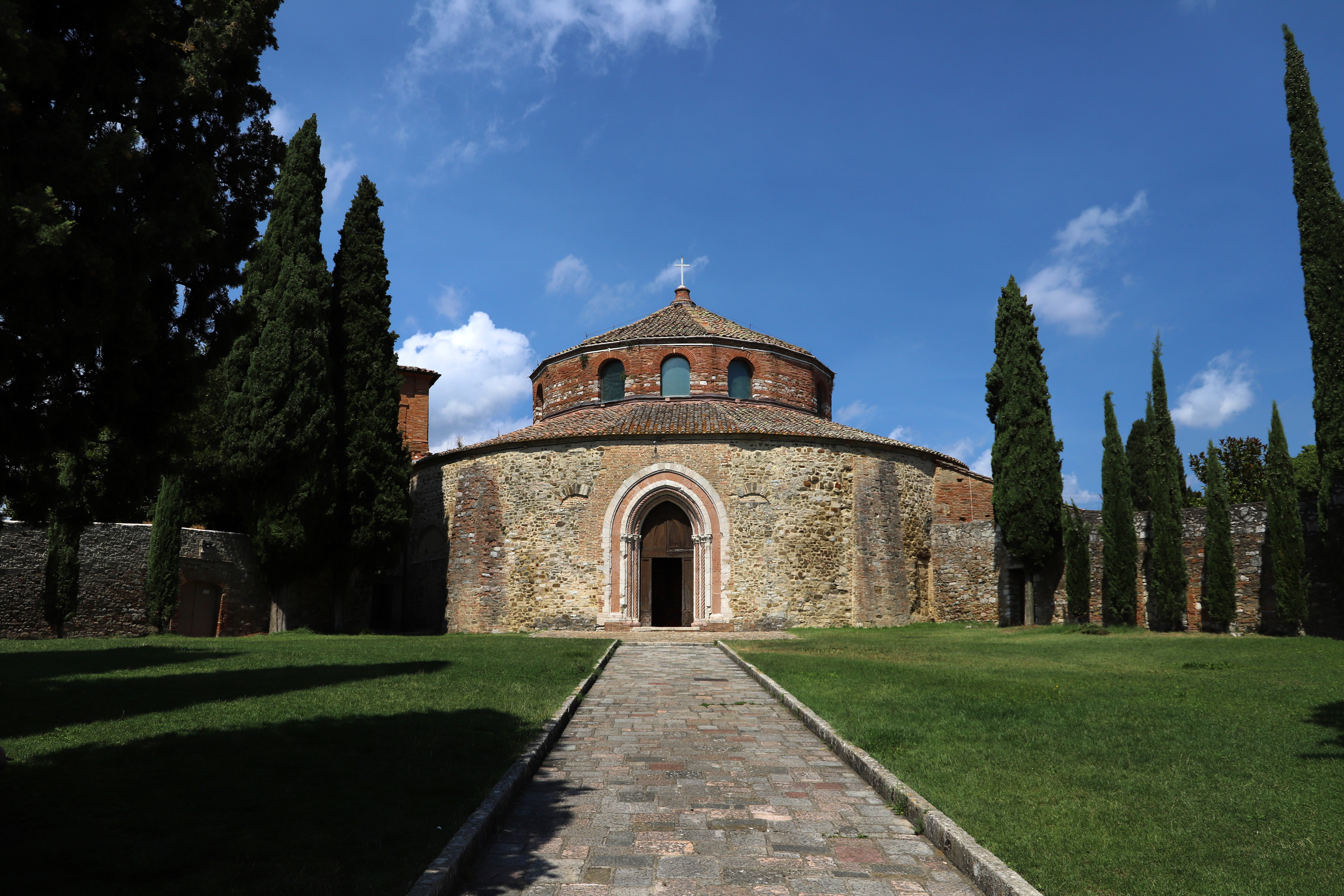
San Michele Arcangelo, Perugia

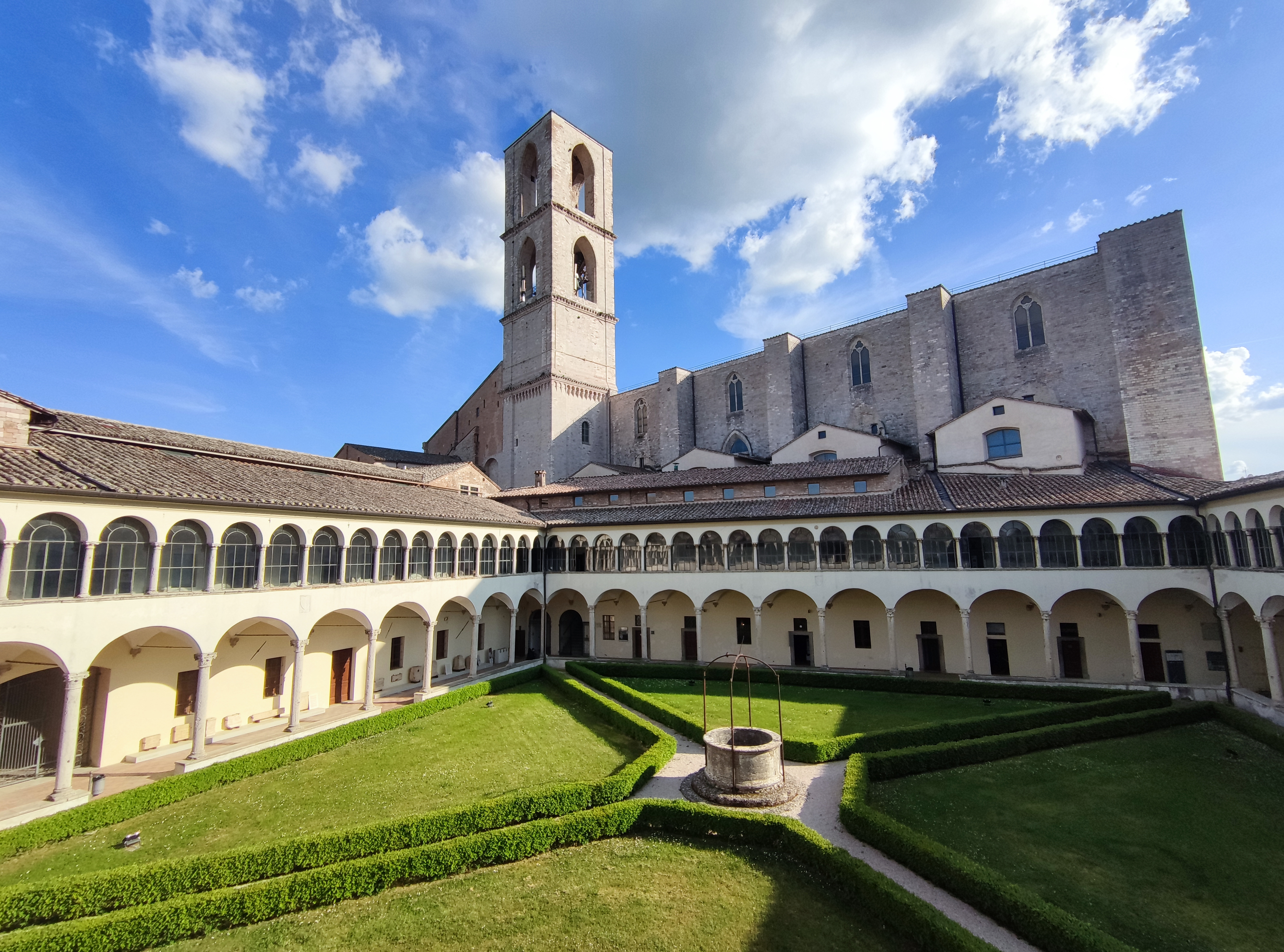
Basilica San Domenico

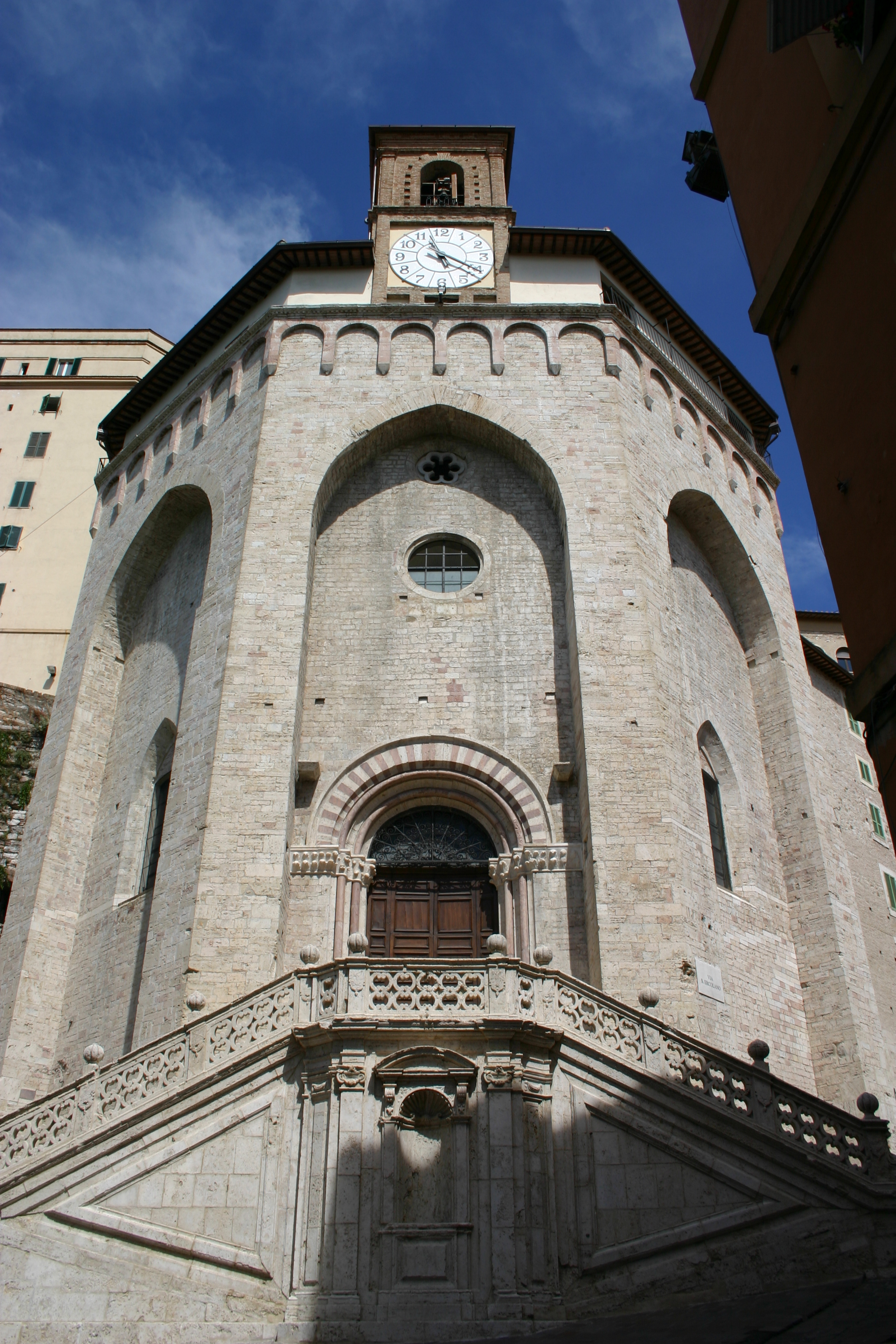
Sant'Ercolano

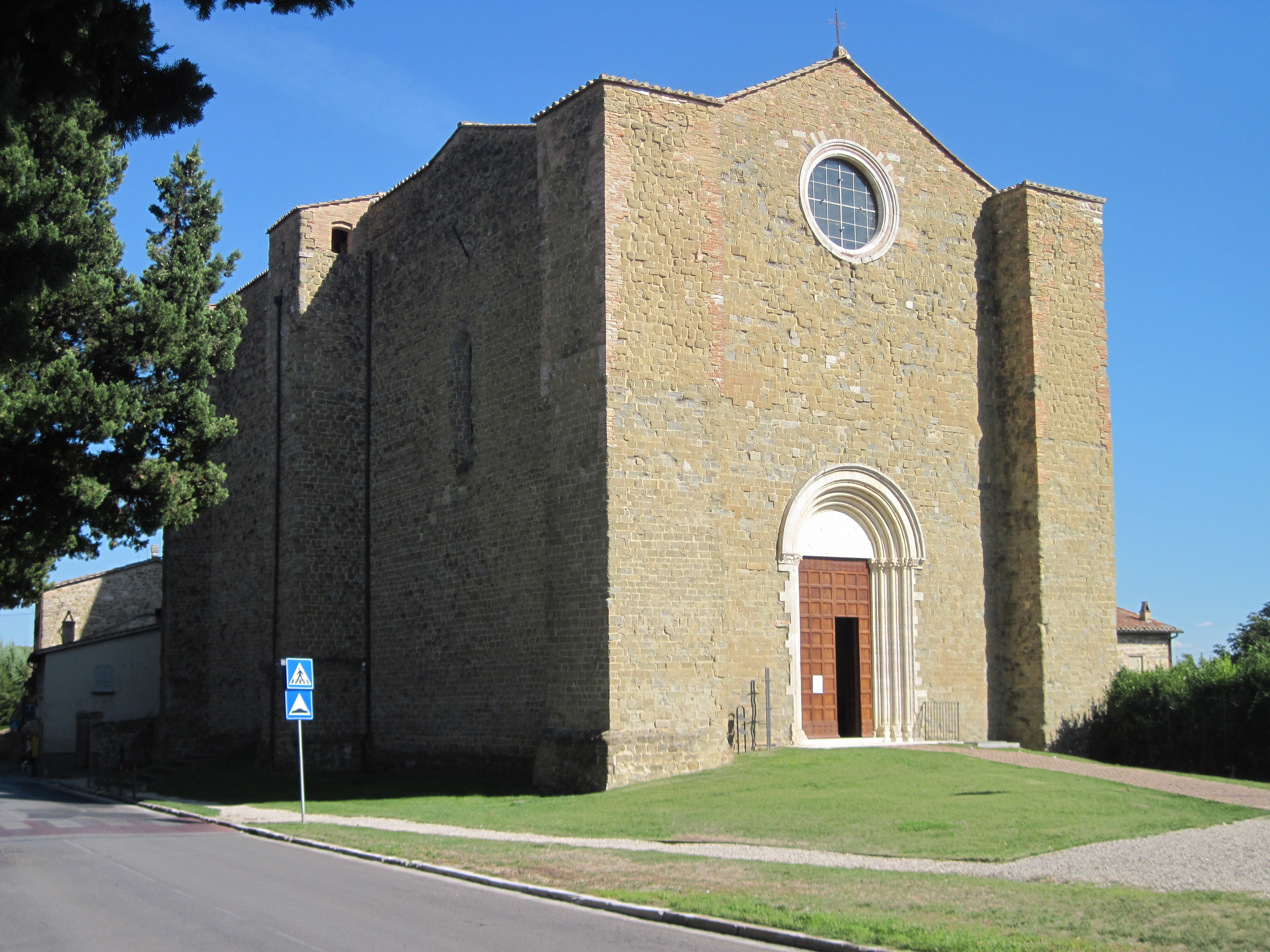
San Bevignate

=== Secular buildings ===
- The Palazzo dei Priori (Town Hall, encompassing the Collegio del Cambio, Collegio della Mercanzia, and Galleria Nazionale), one of Italy's greatest buildings. The Collegio del Cambio has frescoes by Pietro Perugino, while the Collegio della Mercanzia has a fine later 14th century wooden interior.
  - Galleria Nazionale dell'Umbria, the National Gallery of Umbrian art in Middle Ages and Renaissance (it includes works by Duccio, Piero della Francesca, Beato Angelico, Perugino)
- Fontana Maggiore, a medieval fountain designed by Fra Bevignate and sculpted by Nicola and Giovanni Pisano.
- Chapel of San Severo, which retains a fresco painted by Raphael and Perugino.
- the Rocca Paolina, a Renaissance fortress (1540–1543) of which only a bastion today is remaining. The original design was by Antonio and Aristotile da Sangallo, and included the Porta Marzia (3rd century BC), the tower of Gentile Baglioni's house and a medieval cellar.
- Orto Botanico dell'Università di Perugia, the university's botanical garden.
- Palazzo Donini, the centre of the Regional Council of the Region of Umbria.
- Palazzo del Capitano del Popolo, 15th-century government building.
- Palazzo delle Poste, the post office and courthouse.
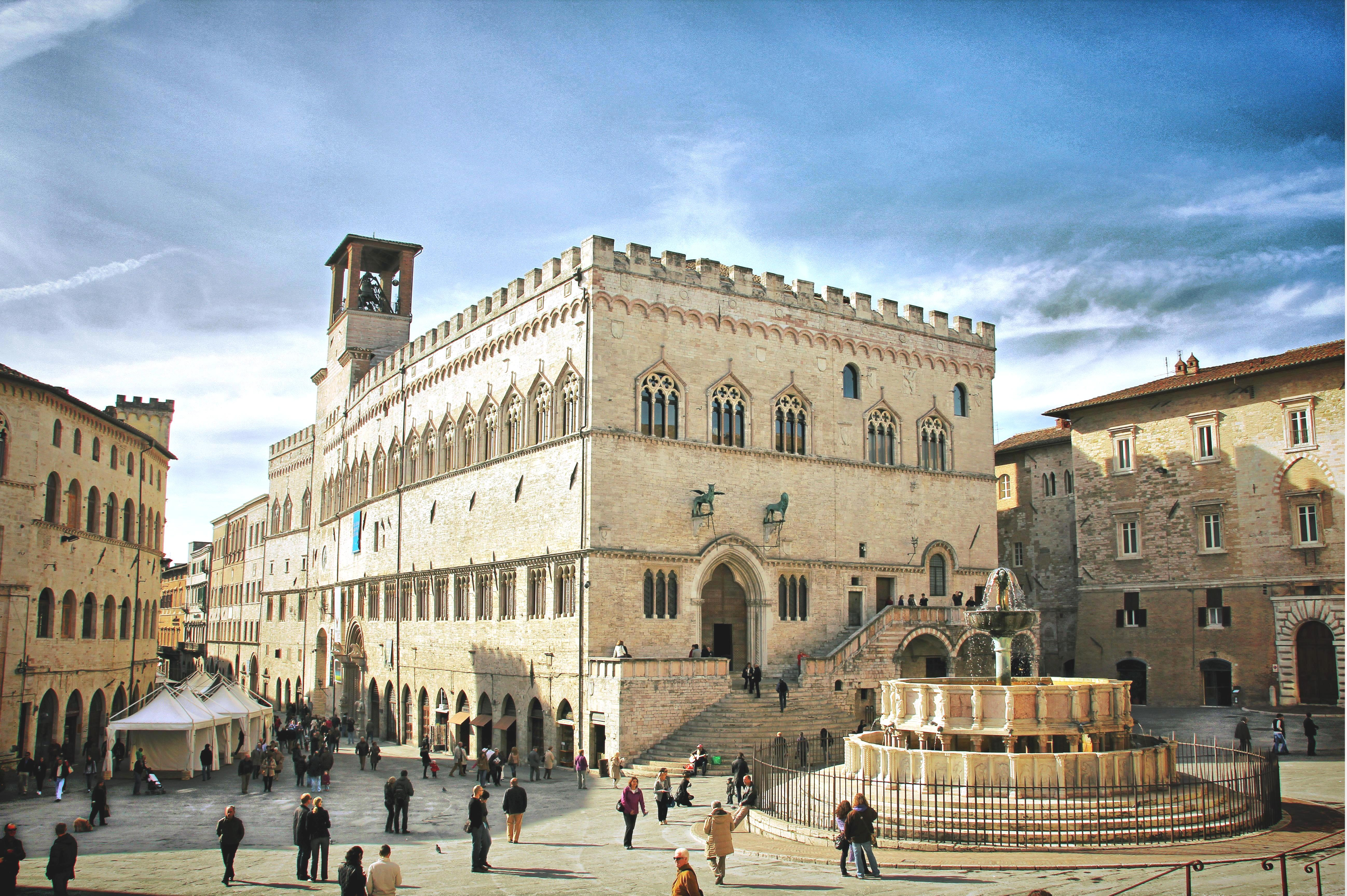
Palazzo dei Priori: the centre of communal government

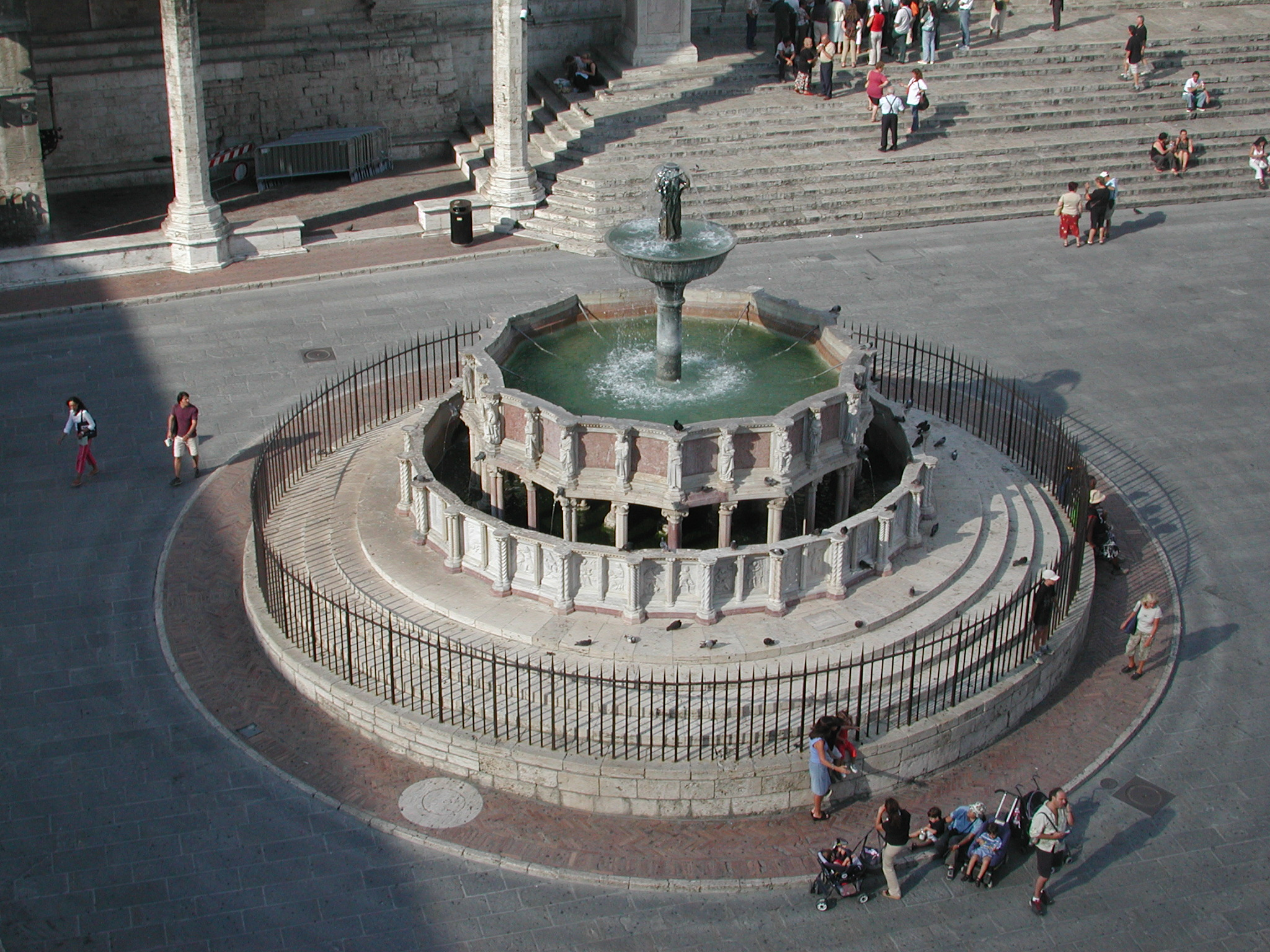
Fontana Maggiore

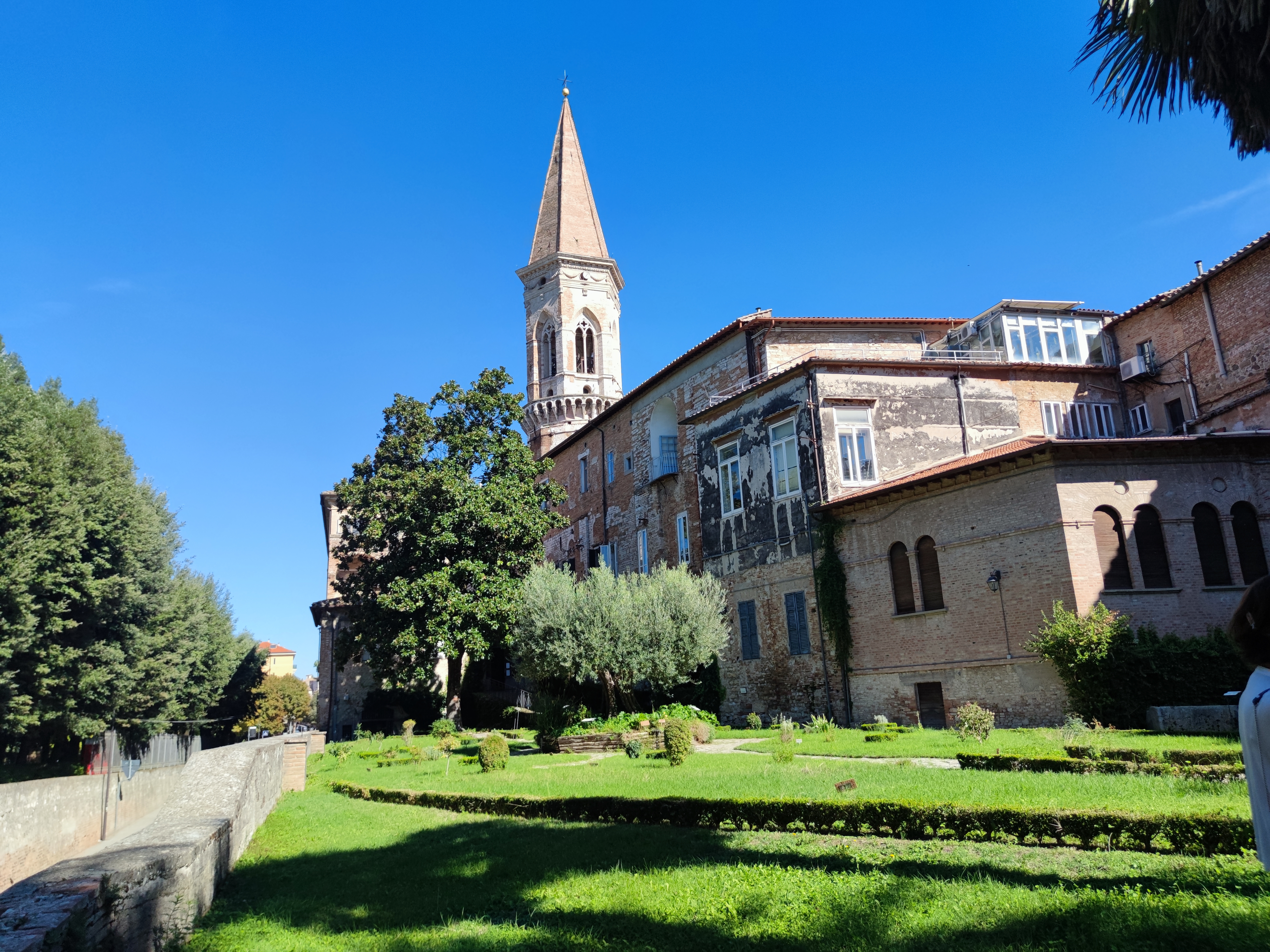
Orto Botanico dell'Università di Perugia

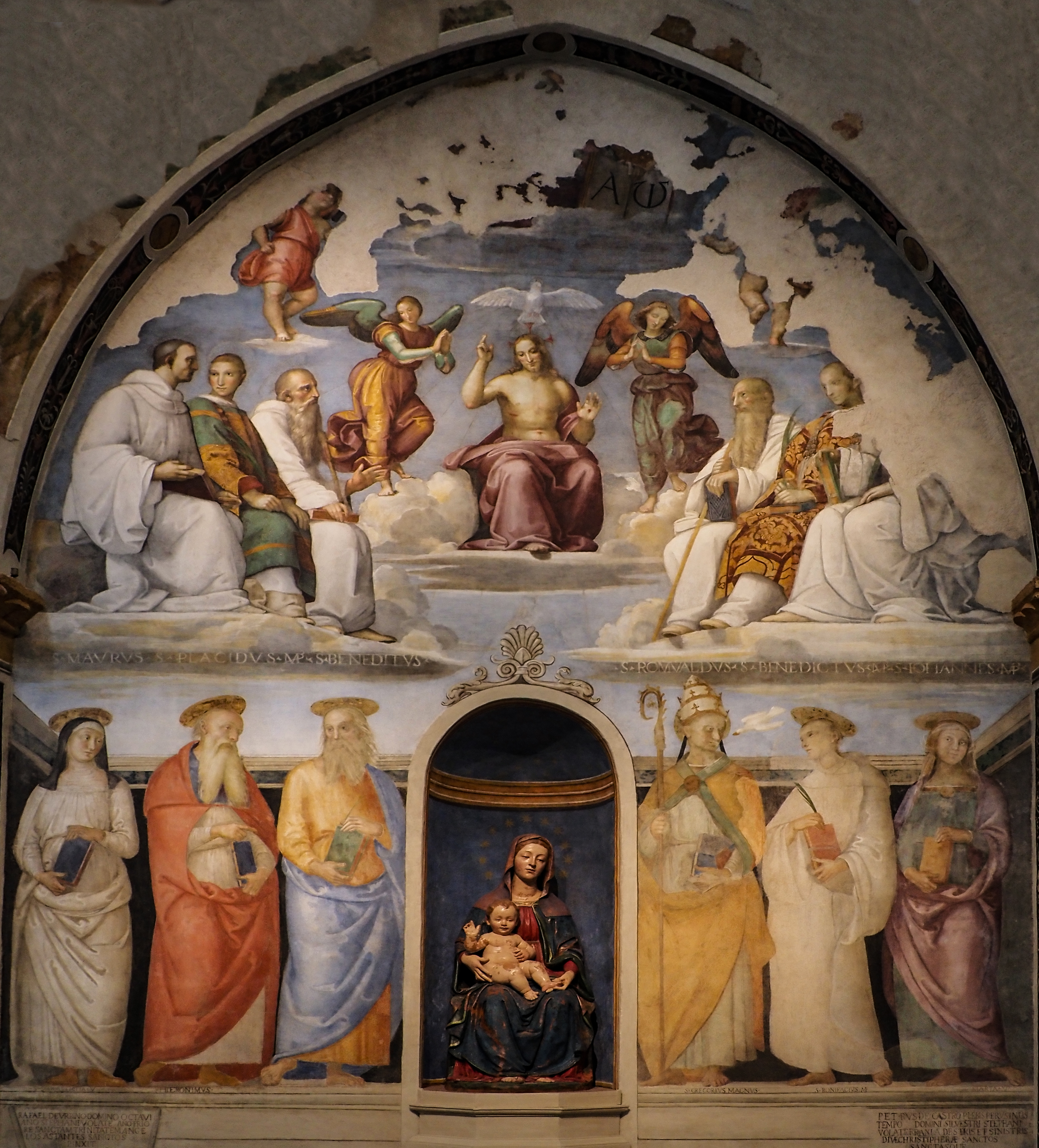
Chapel of San Severo

=== Medieval towers ===
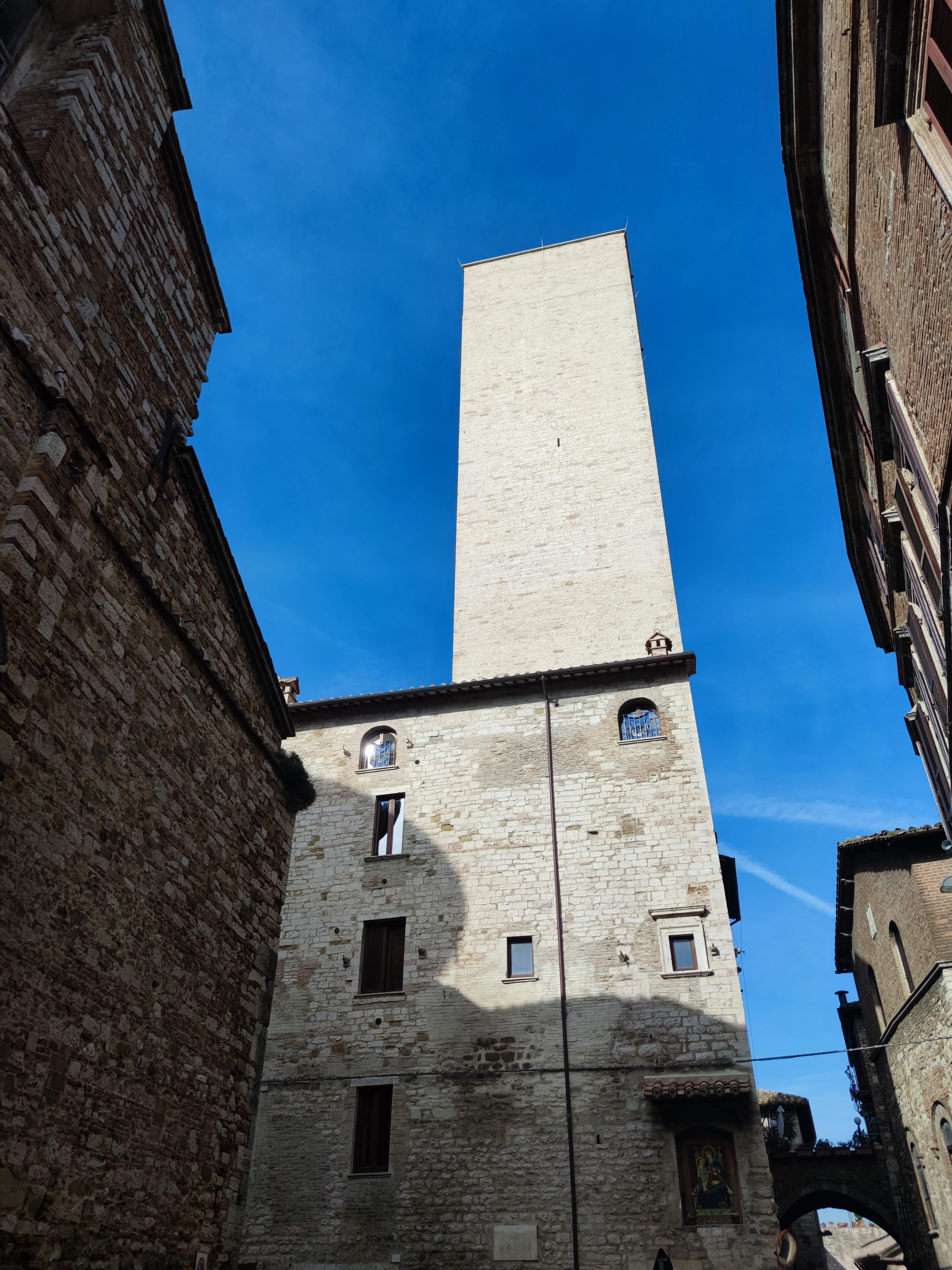
- Torre degli Sciri
  Sciri's tower (XIII century), the most well known among the remaining towers in Perugia. It takes its name from the Sciri family and is the only control tower on the noble blocks that still stands. Standing at 42 meters tall and featuring a square shape, it has recently undergone a renovation that has restored its ancient hues, including the distinctive color of the building stone. In 1680, the tower was incorporated into the Convent of the Franciscan Tertiaries of Sister Lucia.
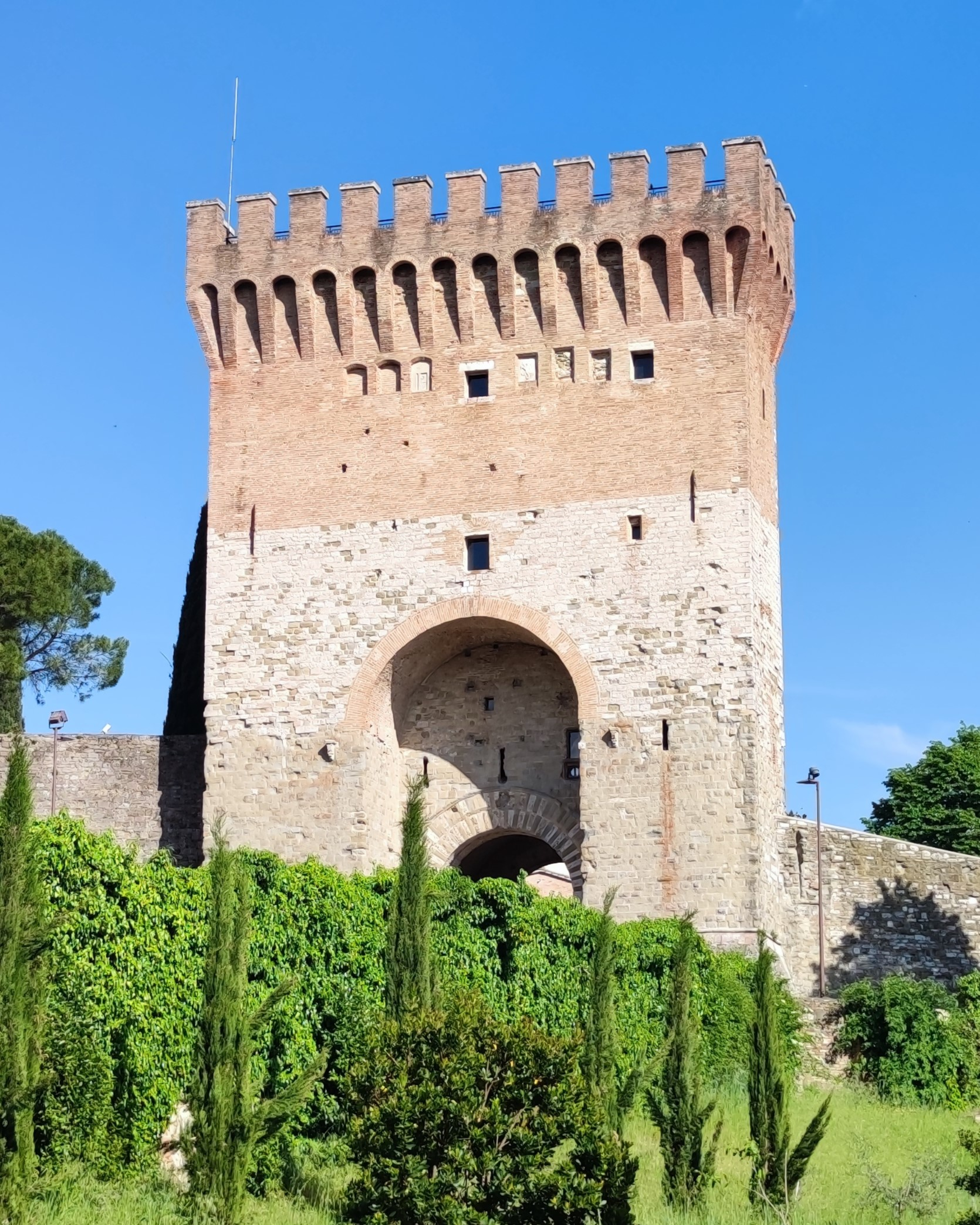
- Torre del Cassero di Porta Sant'Angelo
  Torre del Cassero di Porta Sant'Angelo (XIV century), is the most imposing among the medieval city gates of Perugia, and it's the only one with a defensive-military structure. Like the town itself, the gate derives its name from the ancient early Christian church dedicated to Saint Michael the Archangel."

=== Antiquities ===
- The Hypogeum of the Volumnus family (Ipogeo dei Volumni), an Etruscan chamber tomb
- Etruscan Well (Pozzo Etrusco).
- National Museum of Umbrian Archaeology, where one of the longest inscription in Etruscan is conserved, the so-called Cippus perusinus.
- Etruscan Arch (also known as Porta Augusta), an Etruscan gate with Roman elements.
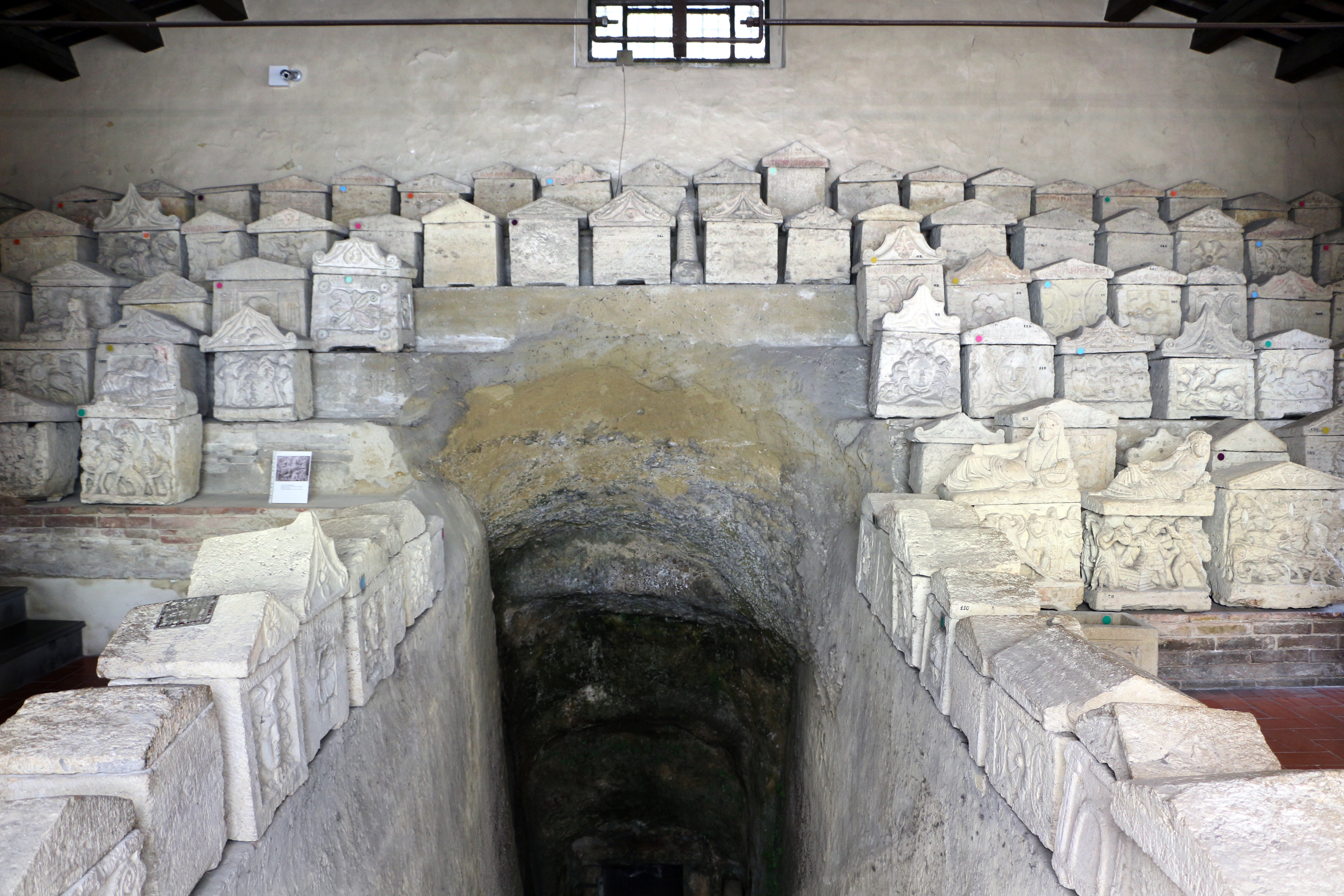
Ipogeo dei Volumni

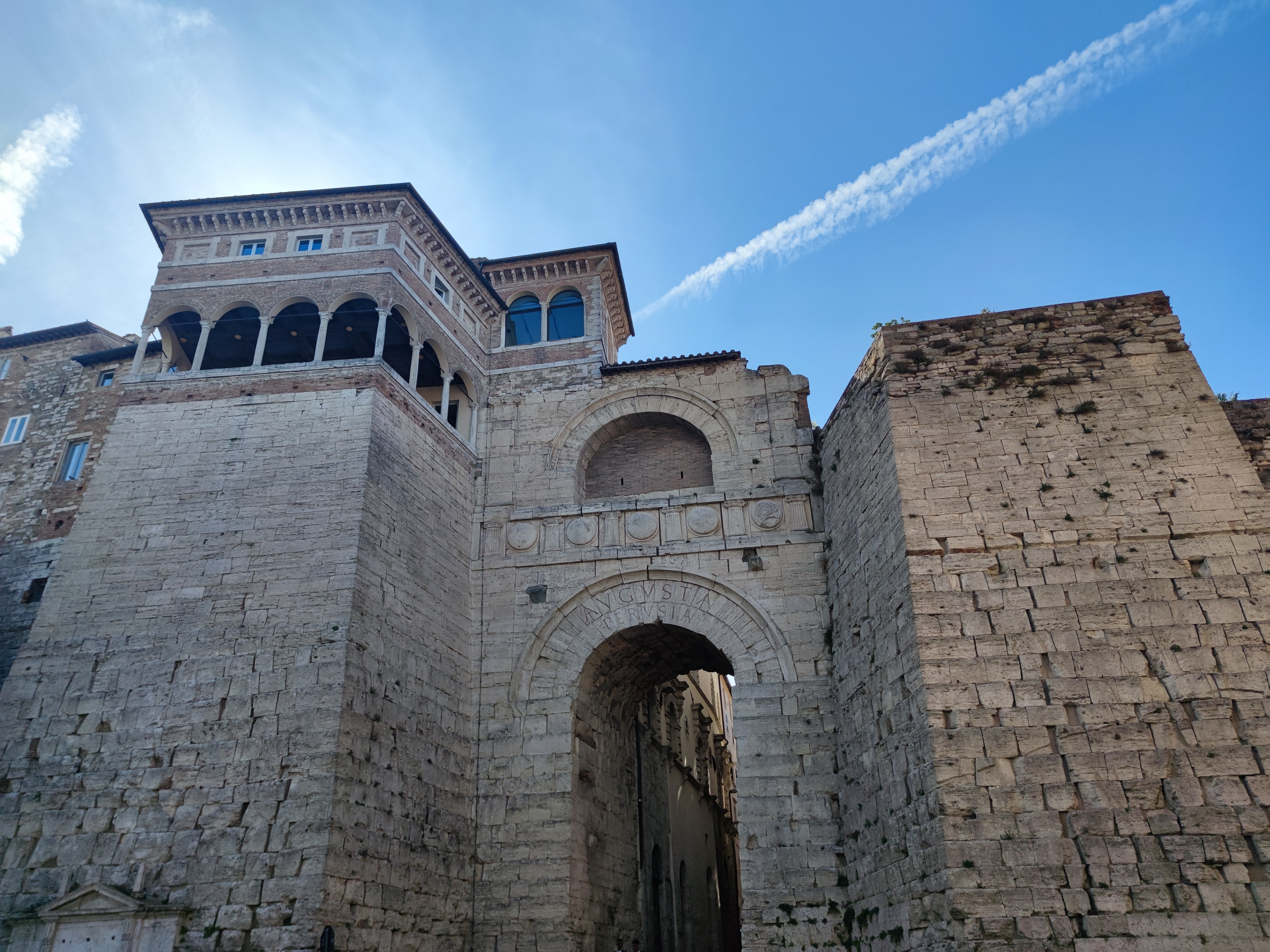
Etruscan Arch

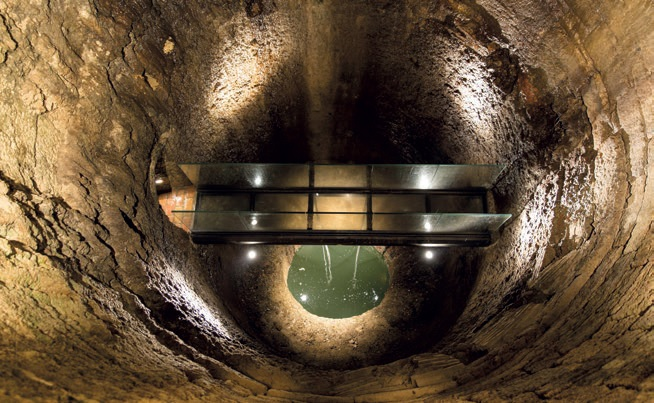
Etruscan Well

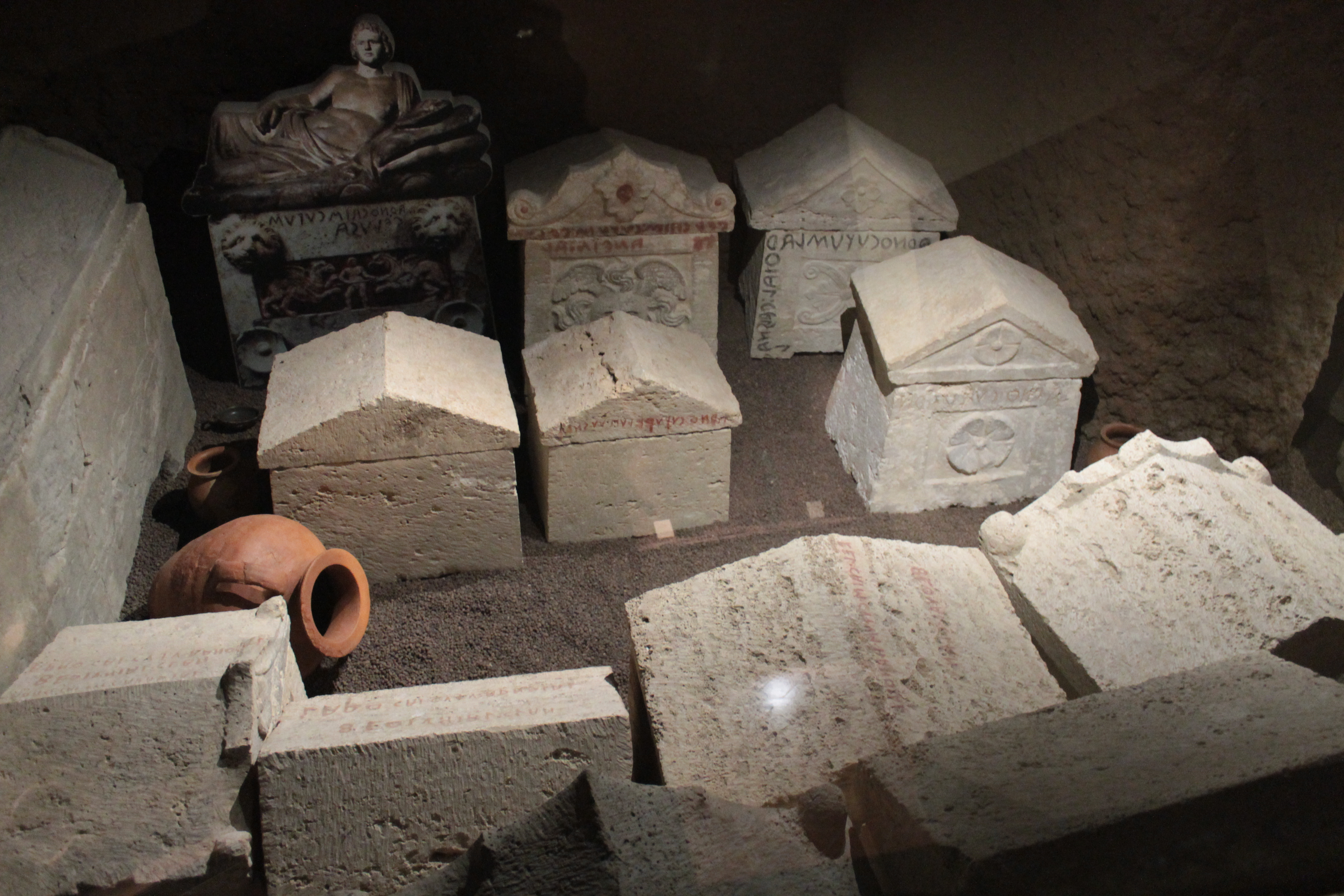
National Museum of Umbrian Archaeology

=== Modern architecture ===
- Centro Direzionale (1982–1986), an administration civic center owned by the Umbria Region. The building was designed by the Pritzker Architecture prizewinner Aldo Rossi.

=== Art ===
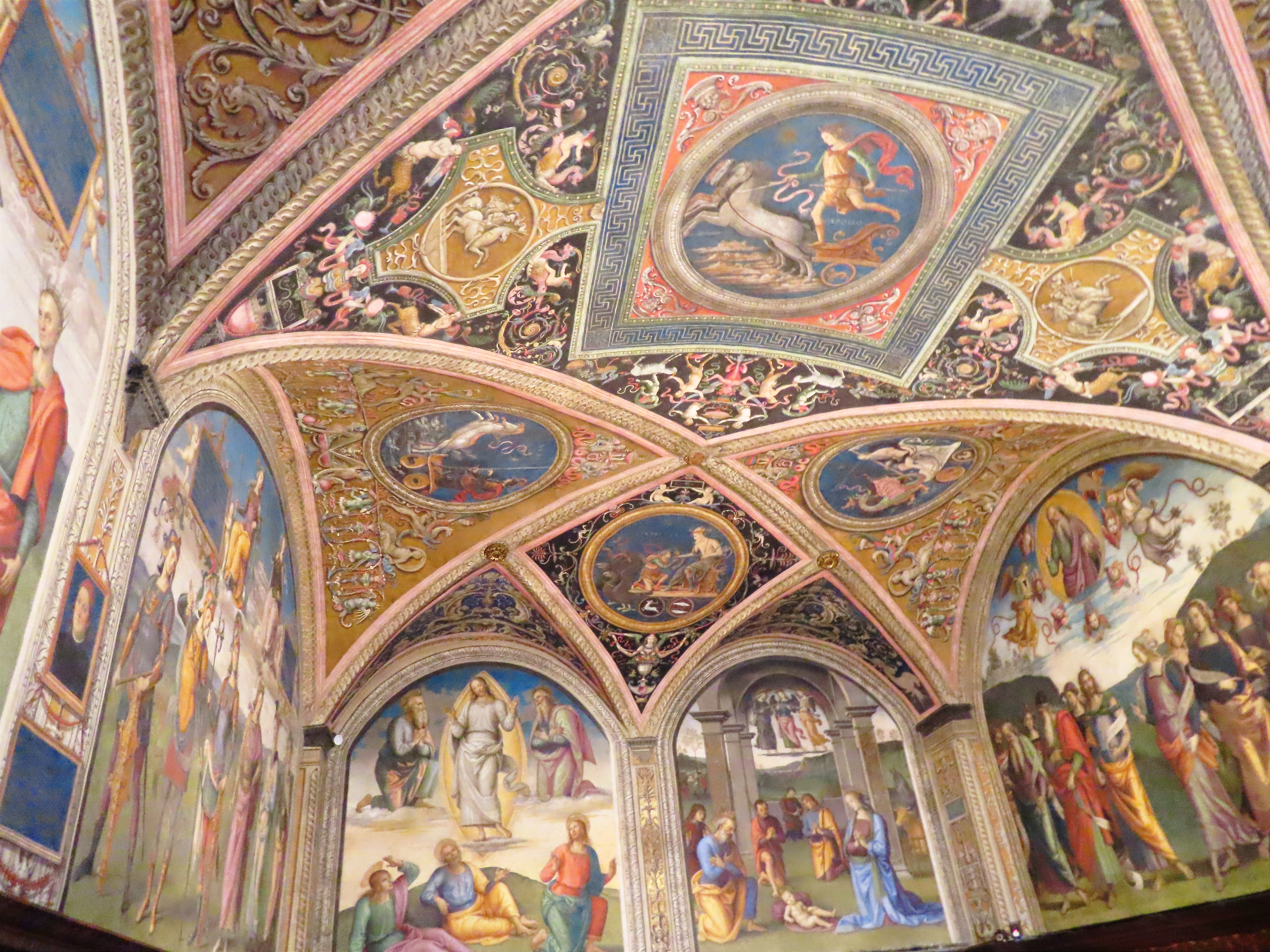
Collegio del Cambio

Perugia has had a rich tradition of art and artists. The Early Renaissance painter Pietro Perugino created some of his masterpieces in the Perugia area. The High Renaissance master Raphael was also active in Perugia and painted his famous Oddi Altar there in 1502–1504.

Today, the Galleria Nazionale dell'Umbria in Perugia houses a number of masterpieces, including the Madonna with Child and six Angels, which represents the Renaissance Marian art of Duccio. And the private Art collection of Fondazione Cassa di Risparmio di Perugia has two separate locations.

The Collegio del Cambio is a well preserved representation of a Renaissance building and houses a magnificent Pietro Perugino fresco. The newly re-opened Academy of Fine Arts has a small but impressive plaster casts gallery and Perugian paintings and drawings from the 16th century on.

== Culture ==
- The Umbria Jazz Festival is one of the most important venues for Jazz in Europe and has been held annually since 1973, usually in July.
- Sagra Musicale Umbra is a classical and chamber music festival.
- The International Journalism Festival (Festival del Giornalismo).
- Eurochocolate, chocolate festival and fair usually held in October each year. From 2021, the festival is held in Umbriafiere in the city of Bastia Umbra
- Music Fest Perugia, music festival for young talented musicians, usually in the summer.
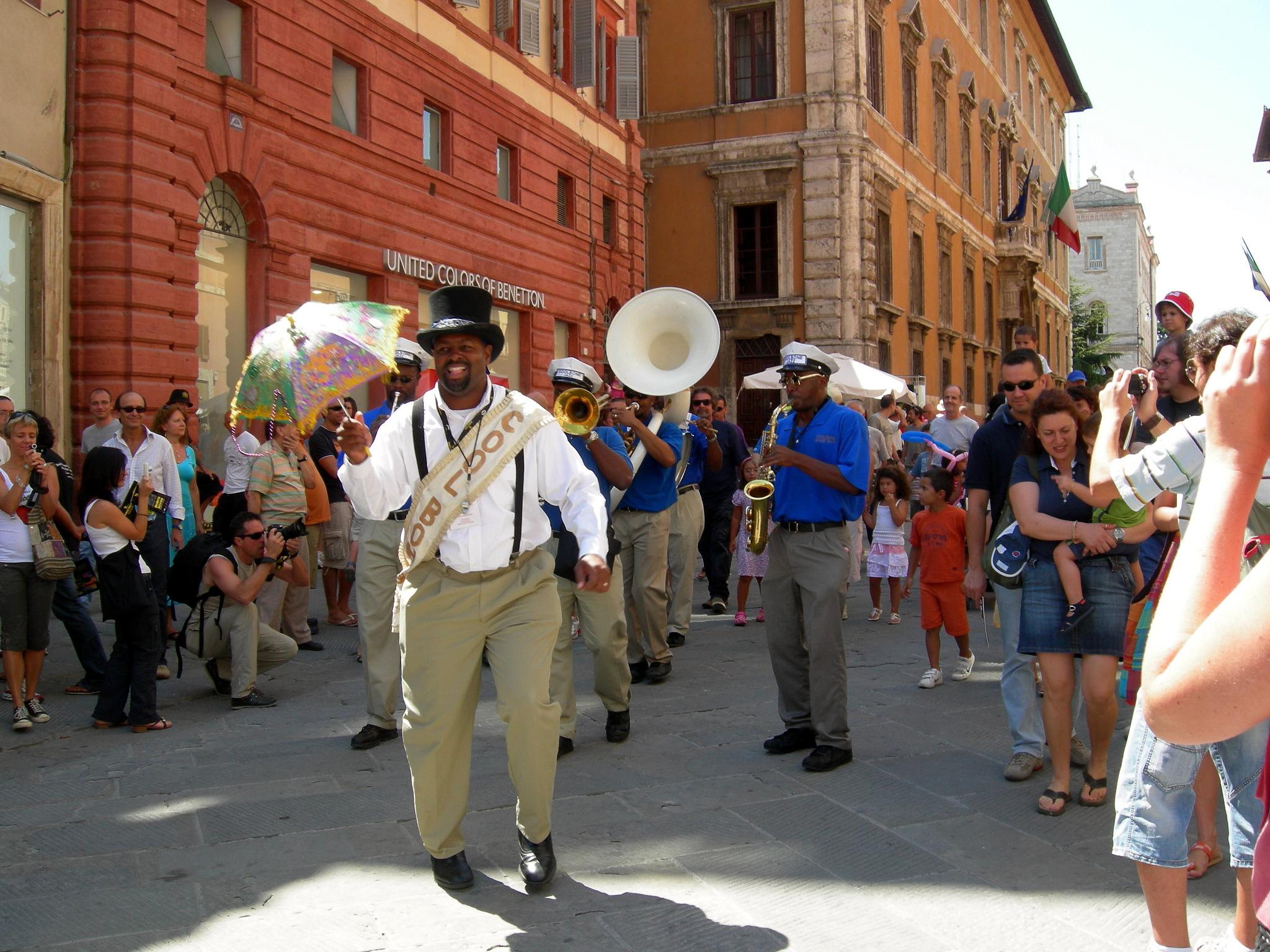
Umbria Jazz Festival 2008

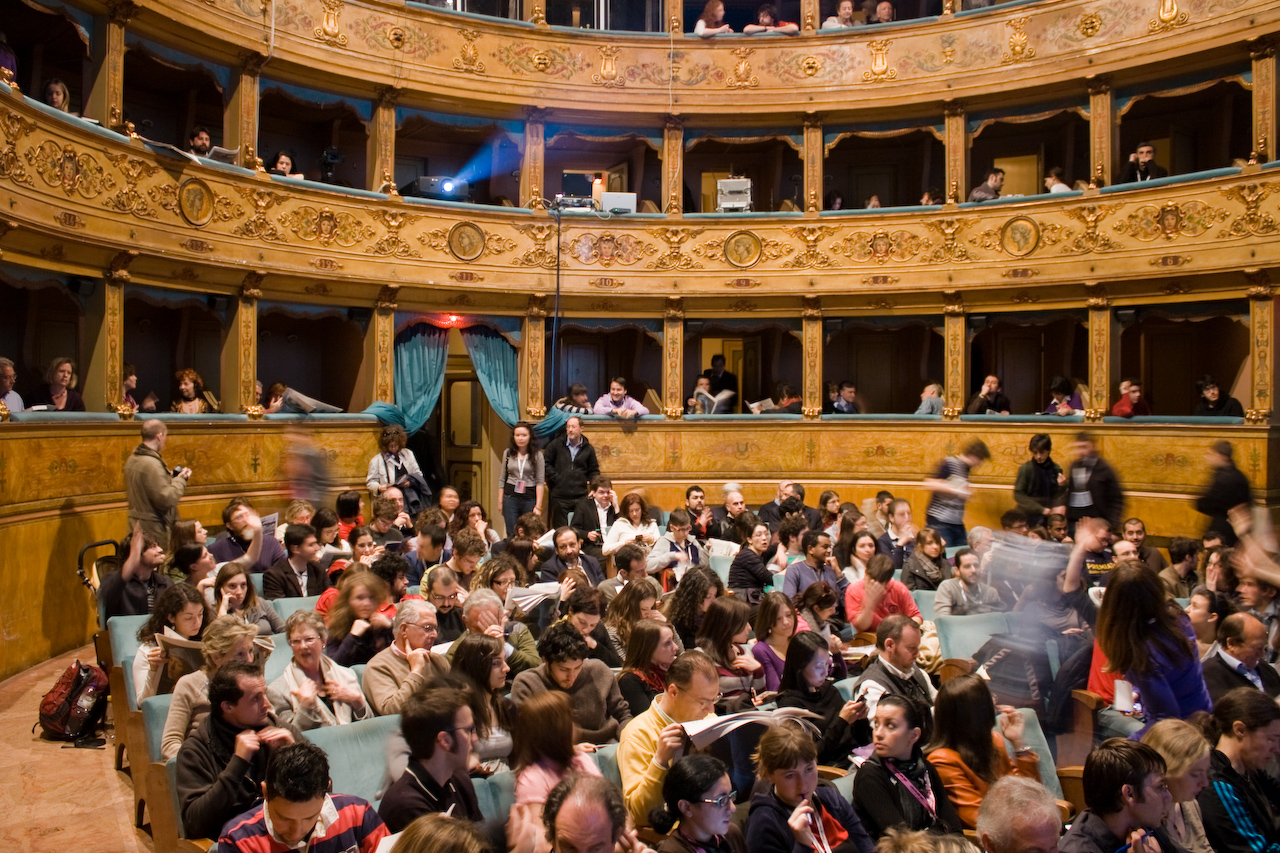
International Journalism Festival 2009

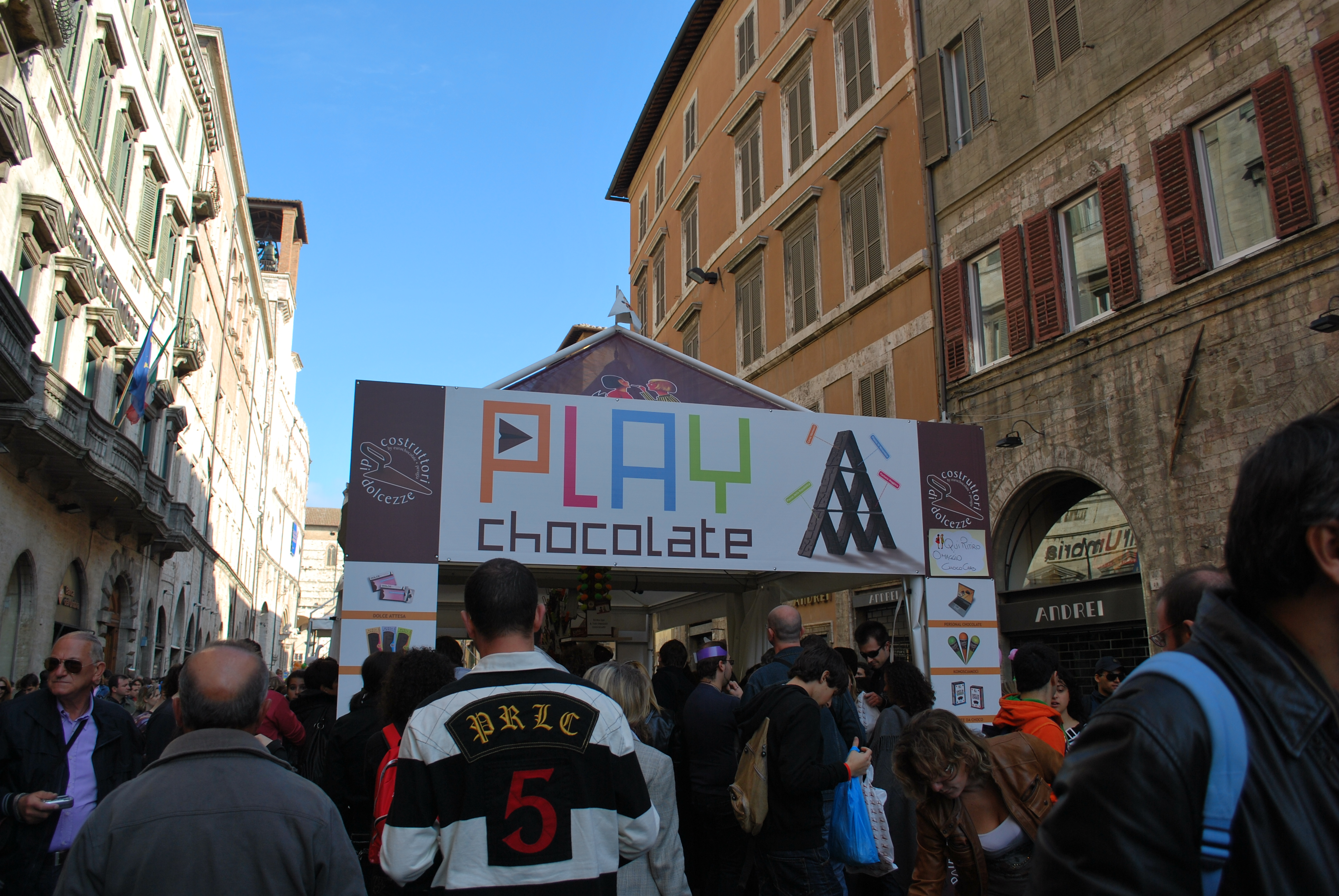
Eurochocolate 2008
- UmbriaWine is a festival dedicated to Umbrian wine and food culture, held annually since 2023 during the second weekend of September in the historic centre of Perugia, Italy. The fourth edition, held from 11 to 13 September 2026, featured around 50 Umbrian wineries. The programme includes wine tastings, meetings, conferences, podcasts, live music and DJ sets, with the aim of promoting Umbrian wine, local products and the region's cultural heritage.

== Economy ==
Perugia has become famous for chocolate, mostly because of a single firm, Perugina, whose Baci ("kisses" in English) are widely exported. Perugian chocolate is popular in Italy. The company's plant located in San Sisto (Perugia) is the largest of Nestlé's nine sites in Italy. According to the Nestlé USA official website, today Baci is the most famous chocolate brand in Italy.

The city hosts a chocolate festival, EuroChocolate, every October.

== Transport ==
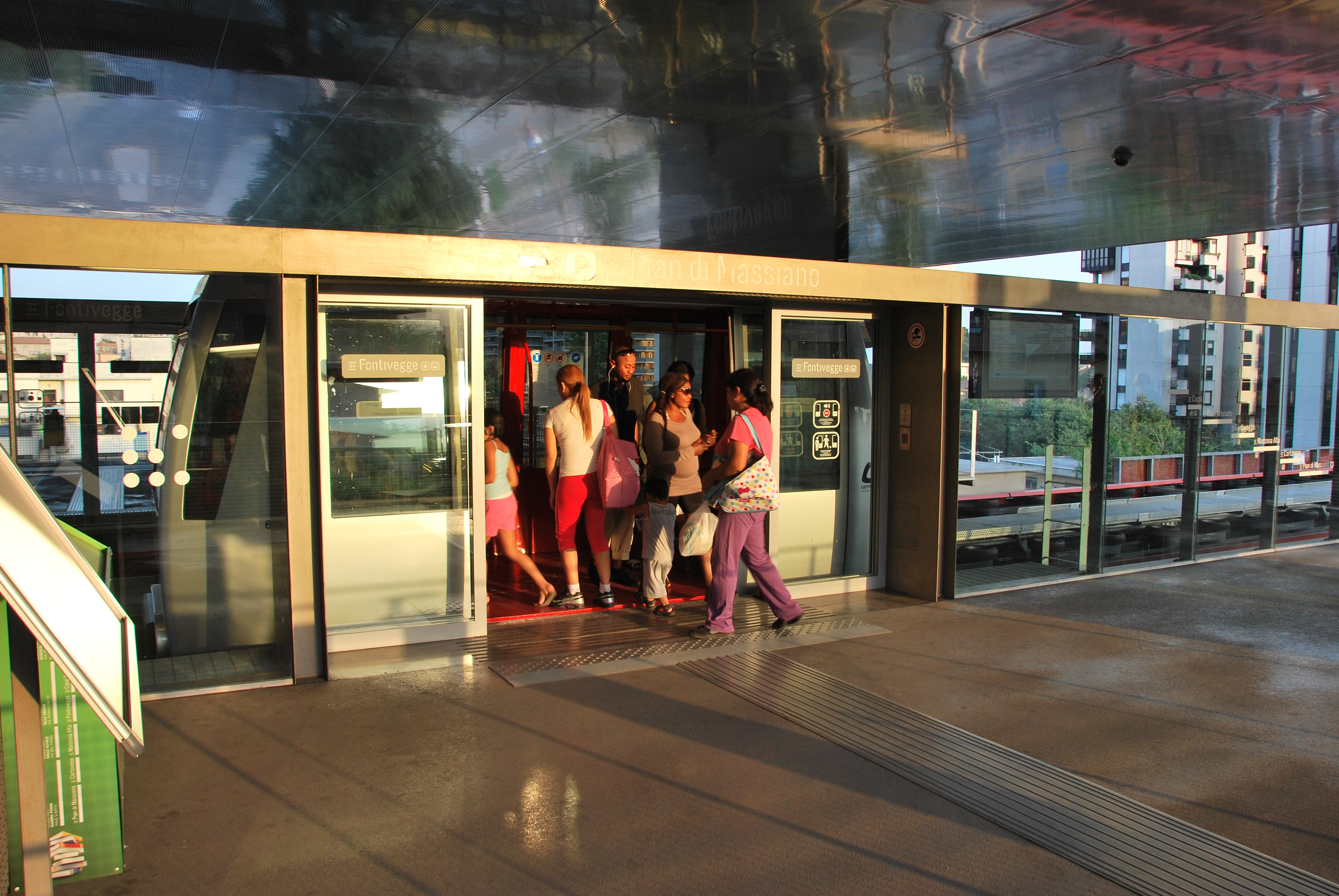
Minimetrò

An electric tramway operated in Perugia from 1901 until 1940. It was decommissioned in favour of buses, and since 1943 trolley buses – the latter were in service until 1975.

Two elevators were established since 1971:

- Mercato Coperto (Parking) – Terrazza Mercato Coperto
- Galleria Kennedy – Mercato Coperto (Pincetto)

This was followed by public escalators:

- Rocca Paolina: Piazza Partigiani – Piazza Italia (1983)
- Cupa-Pellini: Piazzale della Cupa – Via dei Priori (1989)
- Piazzale Europa – Piazzale Bellucci (1993)
- Piazzale Bellucci – Corso Cavour (1993)
- Minimetrò: Pincetto – Piazza Matteotti (2008)

Since 1971 Perugia has taken several measures against car traffic, when the first traffic restriction zone was implemented. These zones were expanded over time and at certain hours of the day driving is forbidden in the city centre. Large parking lots are provided in the lower town, from where the city can be reached via public transport.

Since 2008, an automated people mover called Minimetrò has also been in operation. It has seven stations, with one terminal at a large parking lot, and the other in the city centre.

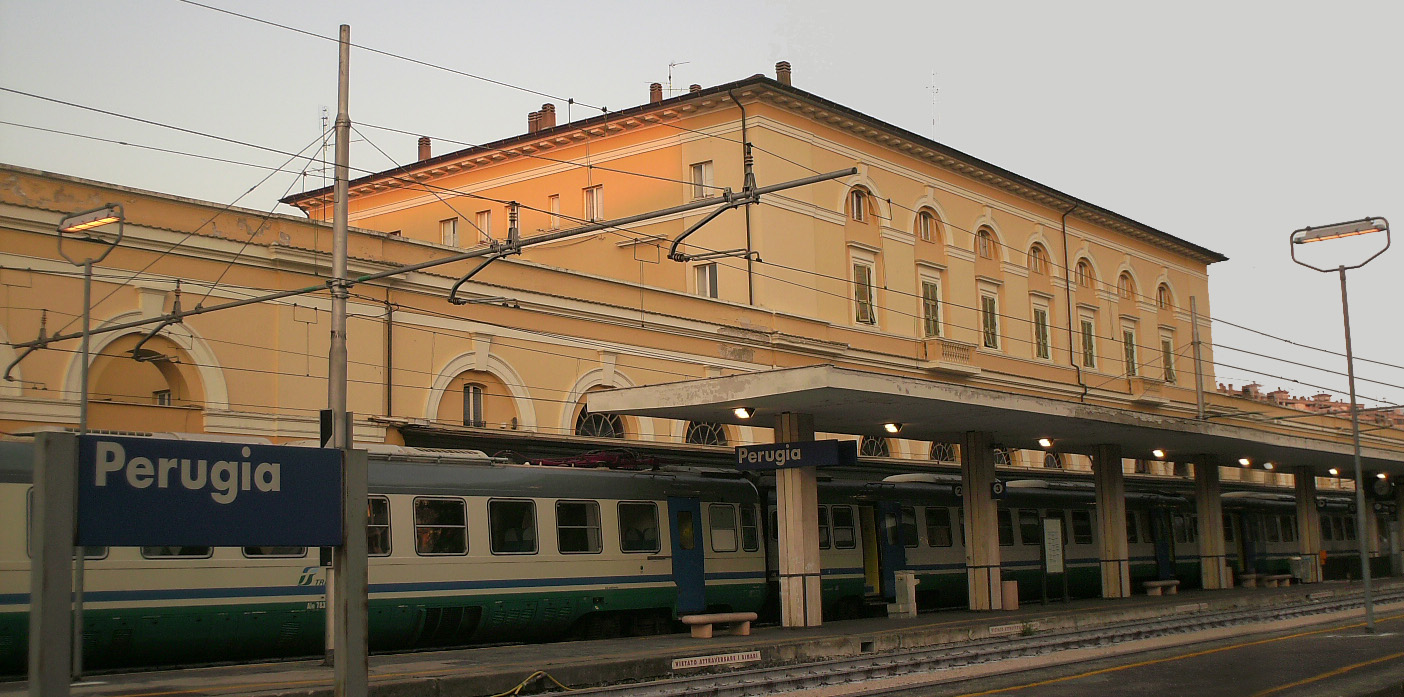
The main railway station of Perugia: Perugia Fontivegge

Perugia railway station, also known as Perugia Fontivegge, was opened in 1866. It forms part of the Foligno–Terontola railway, which also links Florence with Rome. The station is situated at Piazza Vittorio Veneto, in the heavily populated district of Fontivegge, about 3 kilometres (1.9 mi) southwest of the city centre.

Perugia San Francesco d'Assisi – Umbria International Airport is located 12 kilometres (7.5 mi) outside the city.

From the bus station there has been a daily connection of ITA Airways from 1 December 2022, by bus, to and from Rome Fiumicino Airport, allowing a connection with the airline's hub.

== Education ==
Perugia today hosts two main universities, the ancient Università degli Studi (University of Perugia) and the Foreigners University (Università per Stranieri). Stranieri serves as an Italian language and culture school for students from all over the world. Other educational institutions are the Perugia Fine Arts Academy "Pietro Vannucci" (founded in 1573), the Perugia Music Conservatory for the study of classical music, and the RAI Public Broadcasting School of Radio-Television Journalism. The city is also host to the Umbra Institute, an accredited university program for American students studying abroad. The Università dei Sapori (University of Tastes), a National centre for Vocational Education and Training in Food, is located in the city as well.

== Sport ==
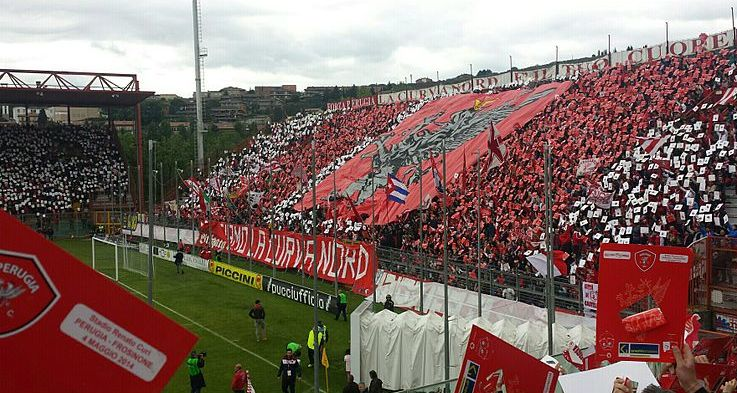
AC Perugia Calcio play at the 28,000-seater Stadio Renato Curi.

AC Perugia Calcio is the main football club in the city, playing in Italy's third-highest division Serie C. The club plays at the 28,000-seat Stadio Renato Curi, named after a former player who died during a match. From 1983 to 2001, the stadium held four matches for the Italy national football team.

Perugia has two water polo teams: L.R.N. Perugia and Gryphus. The team of LRN Perugia is currently in SERIE B (second-highest division) and the Gryphus team is in the SERIE C (the third highest) division. The L.R.N Perugia has also a women's water polo team which is also playing in the division of SERIE B.

Sir Safety Umbria Volley, in English Sir Sicoma Colussi Perugia, is an Italian volleyball club, playing at the top level of the Italian Volleyball League. They won their first Italian championship in 2018. Notable players include Luciano de Cecco of Argentina, Aleksandar Atanasijević of Serbia, and Wilfredo Leon of Poland.

The martial arts in Perugia have been present since the sixties with Chinese techniques, followed by judo. Later there were karate contact (later called kickboxing), karate, taijiquan, jūjutsu, kendo, aikido, taekwondo and, in recent years, krav maga has also arrived.

In 2014 Jessica Scricciolo, under the Ju-Jitsu Sports Group Perugia, won the title of World Champion in the Fighting System speciality, 55 kg. In March 2015 at the World Championship of Greece (J.J.I.F.) Andrea Calzon' (Ju-Jitsu Sports Group Perugia) won the gold medal in the Ne-Waza (U21.56 kg) and a bronze medal in the Fighting System.

== Notable people ==
- Trebonianus Gallus (206–253), Roman emperor
- Aaron the Bookseller, dealer in Hebrew and other ancient manuscripts
- Margaret of Castello (1287–1320), saint, lay Dominican
- Bartolo da Sassoferrato (1314–1357), medieval jurist
- Baldo degli Ubaldi (1327–1400), medieval jurist
- Biordo Michelotti (1352–1398), condottiero
- Braccio da Montone (1368–1424), condottiero
- Matteo da Perugia (fl. 1390–1416), composer
- Niccolò Piccinino (1386–1444), condottiero
- Agostino di Duccio (c. 1418 – c. 1481), sculptor
- Perugino (1450–1523), painter
- Pinturicchio (1454–1513), painter
- Giulio III (1487–1555), pope
- Galeazzo Alessi (1512–1572), architect
- Vincenzo Danti (1530–1576), sculptor and civil engineer
- Ignazio Danti (1536–1586), mathematician, cosmographer, and bishop
- Giovanni Andrea Angelini Bontempi (1624–1705), composer
- Baldassarre Orsini (1732–1820), architect, academic, and art historian
- Annibale Mariotti (1738–1801), physician and poet
- Francesco Morlacchi (1784–1841), composer
- Gertrude Prosperi (1799–1847), Roman Catholic professed religious
- Assunta Pieralli (1807–1865), poet and teacher
- Luisa Spagnoli (1877–1935), entrepreneur
- Giuseppe Prezzolini (1882–1982), writer
- Gerardo Dottori (1884–1977), painter
- Gabriele Santini (1886–1964), orchestral conductor
- Aldo Capitini (1899–1968), philosopher
- Sandro Penna (1906–1977), poet
- Walter Binni (1913–1997), literary critic
- Walkiria Terradura (1924–2023), Partisan
- Antonietta Stella (1929–2022), soprano
- Francesco Ascani (born 1952), racing driver
- Giovanni Mirabassi (born 1970), jazz musician
- Marco Taccucci (born 1977), footballer
- Lorela Cubaj (born 1999), basketball player

== International relations ==
=== Twin towns – sister cities ===
Perugia is twinned with:

- (United States) Scranton, U.S.
- Aix-en-Provence, France
- Bratislava, Slovakia, since 1962
- (United States) Grand Rapids, U.S.
- Potsdam, Germany
- (United States) Seattle, U.S.
- Tübingen, Germany

== Bibliography ==
- Conestabile della Staffa, Giancarlo (1855). I Monumenti di Perugia etrusca e romana. Perugia.
- Gallenga Stuart, Romeo Adriano (1905). Perugia. Bergamo: Istituto italiano d'arti grafiche Editore.
- Grundman, John P (1992). The Popolo at Perugia, 1139-1309. Depuazione di storia patria per l’Umbria.
- Heywood, William (1910). A history of Perugia. London: Methuen & Co.
- Mancini, Francesco Federico; Giovanna Casagrande (1998). Perugia – guida storico-artistica. Perugia: Italcards. ISBN 88-7193-746-5.
- Rubin Blanshei, Sarah (1976). Perugia, 1260-1340: Conflict and Change in a Medieval Italian Urban Society. Philadelphia: American Philosophical Society. ISBN 0-87169-662-2.
- Rossi, Raffaele; et al. (1993). Perugia. Milan: Elio Sellino Editore. ISBN 88-236-0051-0.
- Symonds, Margaret; Lina Duff Gordon (1898). The Story of Perugia. London: J.M. Dent & Co. ISBN 0-8115-0865-X.
- Zappelli, Maria Rita (2013). Zachary Nowak (ed.). Home Street Home: Perugia's History Told Through its Streets. Perugia: Morlacchi Editore. ISBN 978-88-6074-548-4.
