= Sorbello =

Sorbello is a surname and a given name. Notable people with the name include:

- Chris Sorbello, Australian singer, songwriter and dancer
- Daniel Sorbello (born 1980), Australian rugby league footballer
- Diana Sorbello (born 1979), German schlager singer
- Mikey Sorbello, drummer in The Graveltones, a two-piece band in London
- Orazio Sorbello (born 1959), Italian football player and manager
- Romeyne Robert Ranieri di Sorbello (1877–1951), aristocrat and businesswoman from the United States
- Uguccione Ranieri di Sorbello (1906–1969), Italian scholar, journalist, writer, war hero and Public Administration official

== See also ==
- Bourbon di Sorbello marquises, a noble family originating in the early Middle Ages in Perugia
- Fondazione Ranieri di Sorbello, a not-for-profit organisation with an office in Perugia
- Sorbello well, in the old town of Perugia
