= Bourbon di Sorbello =

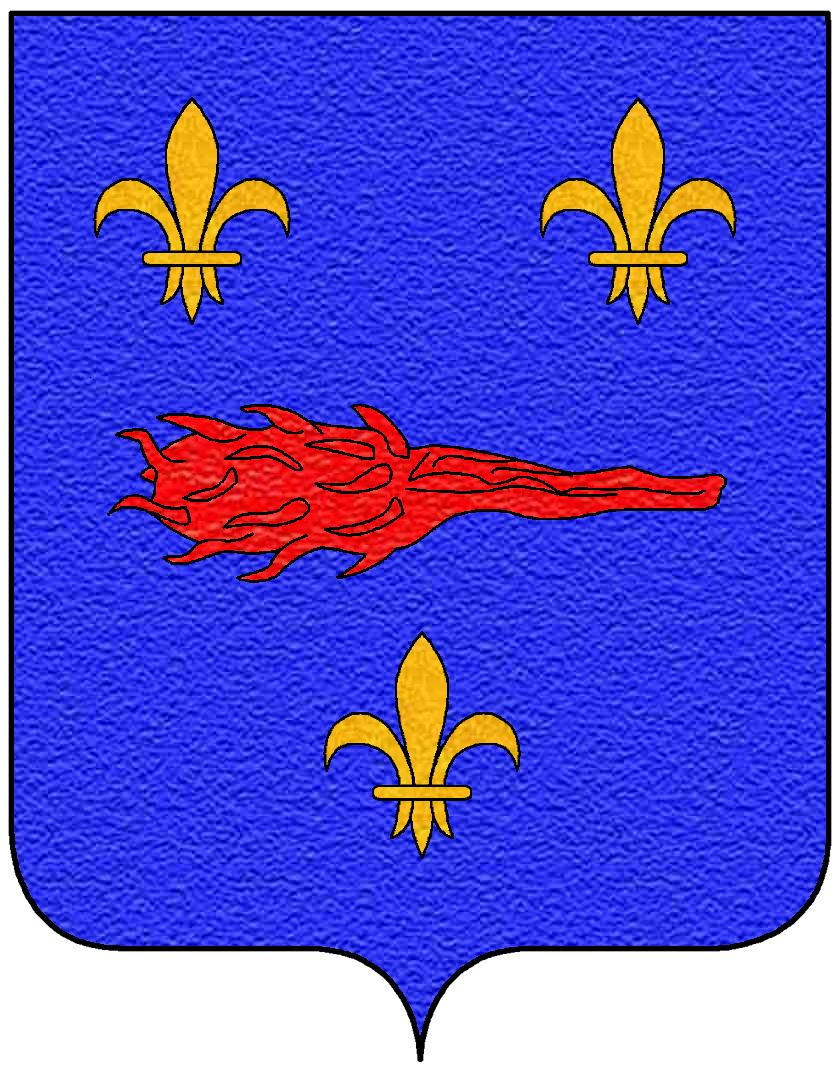
- Country: Imperial fief of Sorbello (marquisate, 1424–1819); Grand Duchy of Tuscany; Kingdom of Italy
- Founded: 1424: following the dividing of the Marquises of Monte Santa Maria feudal properties between the brothers Cerbone and Lodovico.
- Founder: Lodovico di Giacomo del Monte (1394-1441)
- Final ruler: Lodovico VI Bourbon di Sorbello (1749-1821)
- Titles: Marquises of Sorbello
- Estates: Imperial fief of Sorbello; Palazzo Bourbon di Sorbello; Bastia Creti; Villa del Pischiello
- Deposition: 1819: annexation to the Grand Duchy of Tuscany.

The House of the Bourbon di Sorbello marquises (full title: Bourbon del Monte di Sorbello) is a noble family originating in the early Middle Ages, the holder until 1819 of the imperial fief of Sorbello, entering among the ranks of the oligarchy of the city of Perugia in the 18th century.

== The Family's origins ==
The Sorbello were a branch of the family of the Monte Santa Maria (later known as Bourbon del Monte) marquises, which broke off from the main line in the second half of the 15th century, exercising its rule over a territory at the border between the Papal States and Tuscany: the marquisate of Sorbello. This fief was originally a detached offshoot of the main family's possessions, but it was then granted by the Marquis Cerbone, regent of Monte Santa Maria, to his brother Lodovico (1394–1441) who established his residence there, becoming the first lord of Sorbello.

Despite its very small size ("one mile in length and three in circumference," according to the description of Lorenzo Vibi, last vicar of the fiefdom), the marquisate of Sorbello had the dignity of being an imperial fiefdom: this is a territory formally subject to the Holy Roman Empire, whose feudal lords claimed their own autonomy of government, recognizing the emperor as the only higher authority. The feudal rights with which they were invested concerned the possibility of waging war against neighbors for territorial disputes or honor issues (ius gladii), civil and criminal jurisdiction, the collecting of various taxes and duties, and the right to coin money (ius faciendi monetam). The feudal lord could also appropriate fines or property left vacant by heirs or confiscated from criminals. Also very important was the right to grant asylum; in other words, the possibility of taking in and protecting anyone, even if persecuted or wanted by police forces, within the limits of their own territory.

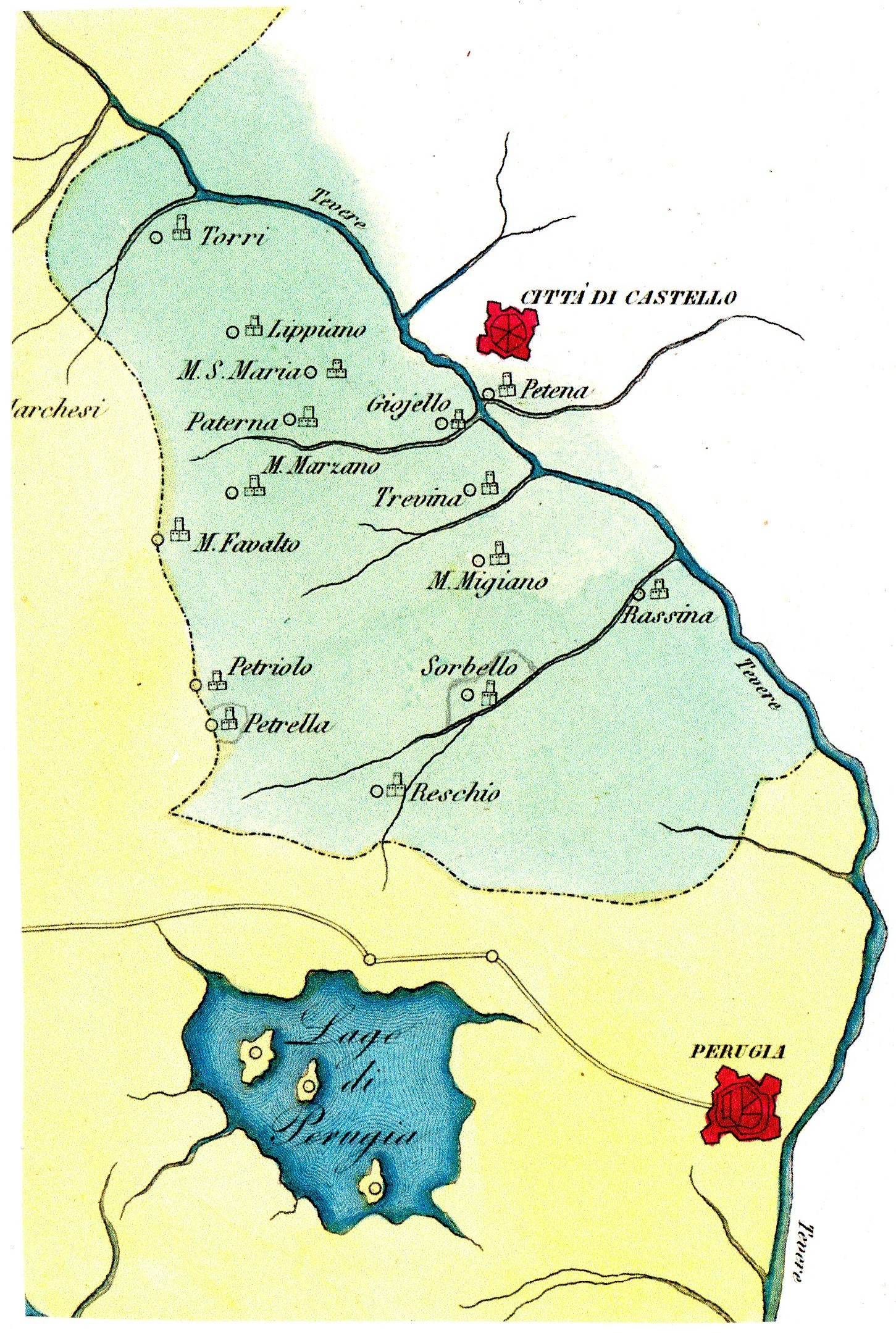
Map of the fiefs of Monte Santa Maria Tiberina, Petrella and Sorbello.

=== The castle of Sorbello: from medieval fort to ceremonial residence ===
The castle of Sorbello, the original residence of the Bourbon di Sorbello marquises, is at present the fruit of a many years of expansions and structural changes that followed one another almost continuously from the second half of the 15th to the end of the 19th century.

The first fortress is a very old structure, dating back to the early 11th century. Part of the original structure can still be seen, looking at the façade of the castle, on the left side of the walls, looking northeast, starting from the old main tower, or keep, which is still standing today. Inside, some fragments of the original structure still remain, easily recognizable in the area of the old courtyard. Until the late 14th century, this stronghold was first a border fort of the central fief of the del Monte marquises, and later of a branch of the family that settled in nearby Civitella (known as the "Civitella dei Marchesi").

Together with the castle of Reschio, another old fortress that once belonged to the del Monte marquises, Sorbello closed off the Niccone valley, forming a boundary for the territories belonging to this family. The new seat did not begin to establish itself until the beginning of the 15th century, with the settlement in Sorbello of a branch of the Bourbon del Monte from the main Monte Santa Maria line, in the person of the Marquis Lodovico, following the destruction of the Civitella dei Marchesi fortress and all its feudal lords (which took place with an assault by the troops of Città di Castello on July 22, 1416).

The first to actually enlarge and modernize the structures of the original medieval fortress was the Lodovico's son, the Marquis Regent Gianmatteo I († 1483). The keep and the minor towers (of which two remain) were left as intact, but new cylindrical towers were built during the 15th century.

Further works done in the 17th century altered the shape of the castle as it must have appeared in the 15th and 16th centuries: with the increasing use of artillery in the 16th century, it was decided to build an embankment that still surrounds the castle, with walls characterized by star-shaped bastions. The bastions were safeguarded by watchtowers, which were named after the saints to whom the nearby churches were dedicated (e.g. the Sant'Andrea watchtower, named after the church in the small village of Sant'Andrea di Sorbello).

In the first half of the 17th century the castle underwent significant modifications, carried out during the time of the marquises Lodovico III (1575–1640) and Uguccione I (1578–1660): the entire part around the main courtyard was demolished and rebuilt, leaving only a portion of the external pediment intact on the north side of the castle.

In following with the new times, in which the fief of Sorbello – wedged between the Papal States and the Grand Duchy of Tuscany, both now firmly established as states, Sorbello no longer feared either assaults or sieges – Sorbello was to be turned into a ceremonial palace, also to give luster to its maintaining of feudal independence. The old building was gutted to create a monumental entrance hall, so as to ensure convenient access to carriages. In the oldest part of the building, the old irregular and partly rounded walls were squared to obtain a staircase of honor. Behind this structure a long herringbone interstice between the old wall and the 17th-century wall shows the line of the old perimeters.

The keep or great tower was spared, as were the quarters that arose with the small tower around the older courtyard and the adjoining 15th-century vaulted rooms, along with the small prisons in the castle that remained buried under the new staircase, intact with their old entrance and lone barred window overlooking the courtyard. The "shelf" remained intact on the old northeast walls, upon which was set the cage in which prisoners were put on display. The new wing consisted of large halls whose ceilings with decorated wooden beams replaced the original vaulted ceilings of the old rooms. A large chapel dedicated to St. Andrew was created below the large reception hall in the west wing, overlooked by choirs and decorated with altars in white stucco.

In the 18th century a new project was conceived to modify the structure, with the aim of transforming the original, albeit greatly changed, design of the old castle into a modern country villa. The works for this umpteenth transformation proceeded slowly, but succeeded in partly demolishing the western bastion around the castle with the idea of creating in its place a series of descending terraces to be arranged as a garden, a project that never came to fruition: the Marquis Regent Lodovico V (1679–1748) instead chose to build a villa for the members of his family on the hills surrounding Lake Trasimeno, a more favorable location mainly because of its milder climate. Shortly after 1720, he thus began the construction of a large villa in Pischiello sopra Passignano, now known as Villa del Pischiello, abandoned any idea of converting the old Sorbello fortress into a villa.

Other works were carried out in the 19th century to recuperate part of the structures ruined following 18th-century projects.

== Land ownership, business enterprises and smuggling ==
The mere exercising of feudal privileges on the tiny fief of Sorbello was certainly not enough to guarantee economic stability, which was based mainly on the substantial land rents from the many lands owned by the marquises in Umbria and Tuscany. In the two centuries starting from the early 17th century, the Sorbello marquises transacted numerous purchases and exchanges, with the aim of expanding their possessions in the Lake Trasimeno area and in the Niccone stream and Tiber River valleys, through a process of the consolidation and amalgamation of the properties and the earmarking the land into estates, most of which were managed through a long-term leasing system.

The fief of Sorbello was converted into an estate of about 750 hectares, managed by tenants: although it was not the most profitable part of their holdings, it was nevertheless very useful, thanks to the sovereign right that the family had been able to maintain on the fief. Indeed, Sorbello emerged as a vast zone for smuggling between Umbria and Tuscany, the importance of which grew significantly when the Grand Duchy of Tuscany adopted a free trade policy for the grain trade. After the severe famine that afflicted Italy from 1764 to 1767, while some Italian states, such as the Papal States, gave more power to their respective food offices, in Tuscany the Grand Duchy abolished them, favoring a rise in prices and, consequently, the illegal importing of grains from Umbria.

The Bastia Creti estate, an area adjoining that of the fief, belonged to the family property. Added to this economic context was the Pischiello estate, located within the present-day area of the municipality of Passignano sul Trasimeno. The central core of this estate, Bastia Corgna, was purchased in 1697 by the monastery of the Beata Vergine of Rome; the grand Pischiello villa was built there in the 18th century, and was owned by the family until the 20th century. Other estates held by the family were those of Migianella and Montone, to which were added those of San Lazzaro di Fratta and Belforte di Norcia in the 18th century, enjoyed by the family as a commandery of the Order of Saints Maurice and Lazarus. Lastly, in the early 19th century, the extremely profitable marriage of Giuseppe II di Sorbello with Altavilla Oddi brought in a large estate near San Martino in Colle, in the Perugia area, as a dowry.

However, landed property was not the only economic activity that supported the family. Between the late 18th and the early 19th century in particular, members of the family also invested in profitable manufacturing activities, such as the production and sale of wool. This was mainly the interest of Marquis Uguccione III, who purchased a share of the wool mill in Perugia together with other Perugian nobles. In 1796 the Sorbello family acquired one third of a paper mill in Tivoli, which was then rented and redeemed by the tenants in 1825. There was a considerable interest in the production and sale of silk cocoons, with silkworms being raised on the mulberry plantations on their estates and traded throughout Italy.

Insofar as it took place largely outside the sphere of the remaining feudal privileges, the rise in the possessions and holdings of the Sorbello family still required an updated system of protections and guarantees, in which the institution of the fideicommissum, or deed of trust, served as a fundamental support. The property bound by the fideicommissum had to be perpetually inalienable and indivisible, for the benefit of a designated heir, usually the firstborn, determined in the deed of foundation. The majorat (fideicommissum) system was a natural fact for the family, which necessarily had to express a Marquis Regent from time to time, but it was originally related only to the feudal investiture, and therefore to a public right, while the successive integration with private trusts was belated and partial, and was also subject to criticism and objections by cadet members of the family. The system was still able to maintain itself, being somewhat flexibly exercised, reserving considerable benefits to the cadets, who were also required to pursue their own military or ecclesiastical careers, as well as to maintain celibacy. As for the women in the Sorbello family, they were strictly excluded from the inheritance: they left the family to enter a convent to study, and later they would either take vows as nuns or leave the convent to marry. In the latter case they obtained a dowry from the family, which generally was very considerable, but varied according to the circumstances.

== Between the Grand Duchy of Tuscany and the Holy Roman Empire ==
By the mid-16th century the situation of fluidity and the jurisdictional overlaps typical of the Middle Ages and the time of the Communes was changing in favor of more stable and well-defined territorial entities: the Church had established supremacy and a certain degree of control over the towns and territories of Umbria, while in the north the Medici had established a Grand Duchy. The Sorbello marquises understood the importance of a strategic alliance with the Medici, establishing an ongoing relationship from the late 16th century throughout the entire 17th century.

Several protectorate treaties were stipulated with the Grand Duchy of Tuscany and often renewed over time, aimed at creating a sort of federation-alliance that gave the Sorbello family special status, protecting them from complete annexation as well as from claims by other neighboring territories (such as the Papal States). The relations, however, were often conflicting: the Medicean feudal lords tried to maintain as many privileges and immunities as possible, while the Grand Duke tried to limit them, at the same time strengthening his authority, especially over the enfeoffed communities. For a long time the marquisate of Sorbello struggled back and forth between the power of the Grand Dukes of Tuscany and that of the Holy Roman Empire, from which it obtained the investitures and privileges with which the family was endowed and that for a long time put it in a particular position with regard to the Grand Duchy, even though this political-institutional combination between subjection to the Grand Dukes and loyalty to the Empire was reflected contradictorily in the managing of the rule of the marquisate, especially with regard to the application of justice, subject to a multiplicity of controls and conditions

In 1699 the marquises were granted a new imperial investiture from the Habsburg Emperor Leopold I, obtaining with it the confirmation of all the imperial diplomas granted by Charlemagne onwards and the legitimate right to use the surname Bourbon. In exchange for this they undertook to put the imperial eagle on the doors and strongholds of their castles.

Following the death of Gian Gastone (Florence, May 25, 1671 - Florence, July 9, 1737), the last Grand Duke of the Medici dynasty, with the Grand Ducal regency passing to the Habsburgs in the person of Francis Stephen of Lorraine, a program of administrative centralization was enacted in order to take over all legislative power, criminal jurisdiction and the rights of regalia, entering into open dispute with the nobility and its privileges. These measures were inspired not so much by an anti-noble philosophy, but rather with the intention to centralize and modernize; in confirming them, there was the wish to regulate autonomies and privileges, which also risked questioning not only sovereign authority, but also public finances. In any event, they aroused consternation and opposition, urging the holders of feudal rights to take defensive action, aimed at claiming their rights and privileges, and also at modernizing their inheritance and property practices. In those years, the Sorbello marquises began reorganizing the family archives, on which they would work for decades.

In 1745 all branches of the family suspended the protectorate with the Grand Duchy and with it refused to attend the Florentine ceremony of St. John, during which all the authorities paid homage to the rulers. They reproached the Grand Duke for not having observed the privileges of the marquisate in the administering of grain, in the immunity of asylum for bandits and in granting the right to bear firearms. At the same time, the Sorbello marquises hastened to extend the fideicommissum to all their properties, taking Tuscan law as a reference. The disputes with Grand Duke Francis Stephen of Lorraine seem to have provided a further pretext for increasing interference by the court of Vienna, thanks also to the fact that Florence and Vienna were governed by the Habsburgs.

In 1754 the marquisate of Sorbello conformed to the provisions on imperial fiefs enacted by the emperor's plenipotentiary, who resided in Milan, in matters of justice, granting the right of appeal to imperial justice and the obligation of feudal lords to keep judicial documents. On several occasions the Emperor demanded that garrisons be sent to the Bourbon fiefs, calling on the marquises to bear the costs. In the years from 1789 to 1792, in dealing with the imperial plenipotentiary, Count Wilczek, Uguccione III of Sorbello requested a new confirmation of the previous imperial investitures as a guarantee. In 1794 the emperor again demanded that the marquises pay a subsidy for the anti-Napoleonic wars; a few years later, in 1798, Uguccione III wrote to Emperor Francis II to ask for help during the revolutionary uprisings, showing himself ready for a yet undefined "union" with the Grand Duchy of Tuscany.

Apart from their political subjection as imperial feudal lords, it cannot be said that the relations established by the Sorbello family with the court of Vienna were particularly intimate. This probably stems in part from the fact that the throughout the 18th century the marquises found it much more advantageous to cultivate close fiduciary and diplomatic relations with another important European court: that of the House of Savoy in Piedmont.

== The Sorbellos at the court of the House of Savoy ==
From the late 17th and throughout the 18th century it was a regular practice to send the Sorbello youths to Turin, where they followed a course of study at the Royal Academy, obtaining high military offices and very often becoming part of the entourage of the Savoy court. The forming of close ties between the marquises of Sorbello and the House of Savoy can be traced back to the death of the young Marquis Anton Maria during the battle of Turin in 1706. In 1699, at the age of 13, he had already begun to attend courses at the Royal Military Academy of Turin, becoming a page to Duke Victor Amadeus II. This was also due to his having had the privilege of being supported in his studies at the expense of the state. Assigned to the regiment of the Dragoons as lieutenant, he was killed in August 1706 defending the city against the French troops in a battle won thanks to the intervention of the anti-French coalition commanded by Eugene of Savoy. Victor Amadeus II was there during the charge and was probably an eyewitness of Anton Maria's death, and in tribute to Anton Maria's memory he reserved for his brother, the cadet marquis Giuseppe I Bourbon di Sorbello, a position as a page, opening the way for him to have a brilliant career at his court.

Giuseppe I Bourbon di Sorbello remained for a long time in Turin, undertaking a lengthy and fruitful military and diplomatic career, taking on positions of prestige. He joined the Piedmont cavalry regiment in 1709 with the rank of cornet. In 1720 he was invested with the title of second squire of the Prince of Piedmont and Gentleman of the King's Mouth, being promoted to the rank of Lieutenant of the Cavalry in the following year, while also obtaining important diplomatic posts. Giuseppe's luck improved even more following the accession to the throne of Charles Emmanuel III, son of Amadeus II of Savoy and Anna of Bourbon: he received an annual annuity of 1,200 Piedmontese liras. A few years later, on the occasion of the birth of Giuseppe's third son in 1739, Charles Emmanuel III wanted to be his godfather and to pass on his name to him. In 1740 Giuseppe was nominated Knight of the Order of Saints Maurice and Lazarus; a year later he would become Knight Commander, and in 1744 he was allowed to appoint one of his descendants to that commandery. Giuseppe remained at the court in Turin until 1757 with the office of the king's First Lord of the Bedchamber, dividing his time between Perugia and the Savoy court, having the chance to directly follow the career of his sons at the Royal Academy in Turin. In his last years he returned permanently to Perugia to govern the estate in anticipation of the dynastic succession of his firstborn son: the Marquis Uguccione III.

Giuseppe I married a Perugian noblewoman, Marianna Arrigucci, a member of one of the city's wealthiest and most prominent families. They had 16 children, including seven males who, following the practice of the previous generation, went to study at the Royal Academy in Turin, at great expense for the family funds.

Relations continued with the House of Savoy until the end of the 18th century, when the French Revolution overwhelmed both the Turin court and, in its small way, the marquisate of Sorbello. Ties were reestablished after the Restoration, although the Sorbellos would no longer be enrolled in the Royal Academy in Turin, nor would they pursue a fruitful career at court. They would continue to be conferred with honors, however, as was done for the Marquis Giuseppe II, who obtained the dress and the Cross of Justice of the Order of Saints Maurice and Lazarus in 1818. His son, the Marquis Carlo Emanuele II of Sorbello was appointed a Professed Knight of Justice of the Order of Saints Maurice and Lazarus by King Charles Albert of Savoy in 1847.

== From feudal lords to patrician citizens: the family's move to Perugia (17th–18th century) ==
Starting in the early 18th century, many families that originated in the early Middle Ages in central and northern Italy preferred the privileges that came from being included in the emerging urban oligarchies to the fortification of their original homes. The Sorbello marquises, who had already been registered among the aristocracy of Perugia and obtained citizenship in 1558, would take on a preeminent role among the ranks of this Perugian oligarchy, gradually strengthening their position from the late 17th through the 18th century. Upon his admission as a member of the Merchants' Guild in 1696, the Marquis Uguccione II (1677–1724) rented a stately home in the Porta Santa Susanna quarter, and a few years later his brothers Lodovico V and Giuseppe I applied to Cardinal Marcantonio Ansidei, bishop of Perugia, to rent part of a building located in the Porta Eburnea quarter.

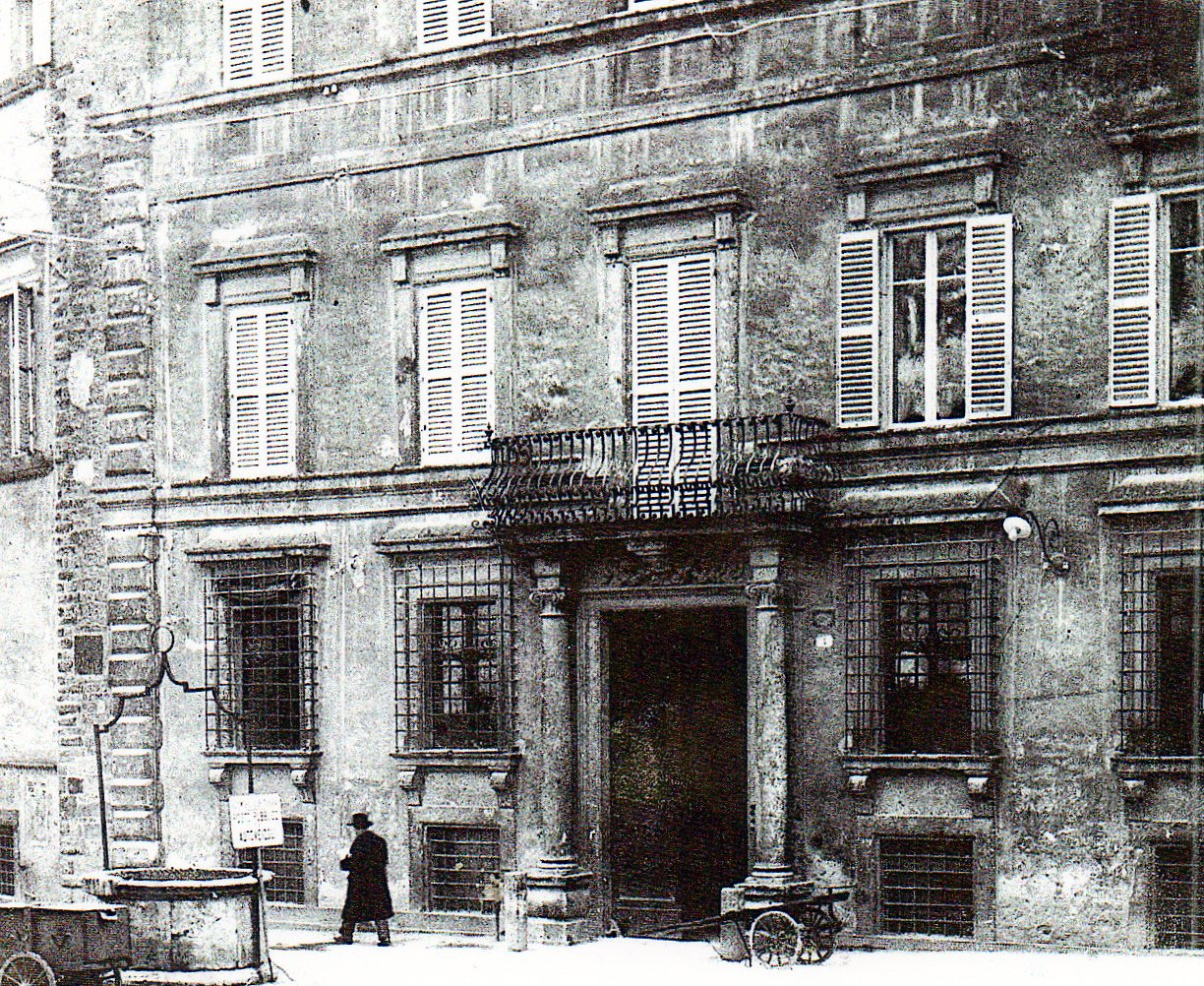
The façade of Palazzo Sorbello in a photo from the 1940s.

Like with the Grand Duchy of Tuscany, the Papal States, of which Perugia was one of the major towns, was gradually recovering many feudal and noble territories within its own administration. From the 17th to the 18th centuries the "nepotistic, princely and military" tradition of the Papal States died out, changing it into a theocratic but not dynastic state, subjected to continuous pressures exerted by the various powers that dominated the Italian peninsula. The growing influence of the Hapsburg Empire, which was eating away at the dominance of the Bourbons of Spain, with whom the popes had strong ties, meant a significant drop in the Papal States international influence. In these circumstances, the lines held by the papal government were established by the central bodies of the Roman Curia, including the Congregation of Good Government, which had specific authority over peripheral matters, as well as the Apostolic Chamber, responsible for finances, taxes and procurement. The old Perugian municipal magistracies, reserved for the local nobility (such as the Sorbello family, who were granted a privileged status), remained alive, but with a subordinate status and limited powers.

The definitive Perugian consecration of the marquises came in 1780, when the Marquis Uguccione III, through the mediation of Cardinal Giovanni Ottavio I Bufalini, bought a prestigious building that belonged to the Eugeni family, located in the center of town on Piazza del Giglio (now Piazza Piccinino). He made it his main residence after a long series of restoration and expansion works, which continued for at least 13 years, from 1781 to 1794.

== From the French Revolution to the Treaty of Vienna ==
During the upheaval of the French Revolution, the first problem to be faced by the family was that of the fate of the imperial fief. During the Roman Republic, the laws in Perugia were generic and insufficient to cover concrete cases: in the new Republic's constitution the abolishing of feudal rights was not explicitly decreed, although the direction to be followed aimed at the abolition of any superiority of rank among citizens, unless it was linked to public functions. The various "privileges" were also abolished, whereas other measures, such as those adopted on March 30, 1798, declared null and void the institution of fideicommissum and primogeniture.

There is evidence in this period of a close correspondence between the Marquis Regent Uguccione III and the Perugian authorities. In February 1798 these authorities wrote to "Citizen Uguccione di Sorbello," enjoining him to put an end to the privileges enjoyed by the fief of Sorbello. The request was accepted: Uguccione consigned copies of the imperial investitures to the authorities. At the same time, the brothers Diomede and Anton Maria attempted a diplomatic approach with the French commanders, clarifying that the fiefdom was under the jurisdiction of the Austrian Empire. They received assurances: France was not at war with the Austrian Empire at that time, and consequently the French would not carry out any hostile orders against the fief. However, this attempt at safeguarding the fief was rendered useless by the Jacobin republican government: by means of a letter from Annibale Mariotti, Consular Prefect with the administration of the Trasimeno Department, it reaffirmed its wish to abolish the feudal rights enjoyed by the marquises.

With the disappearance of the Jacobin danger, the situation worsened again in 1809, when the Sorbello fief became part of the French territory within the district of Perugia. In these years the creation of a land register was first begun, though with great delay. This job was entrusted to an abbot with clear Jacobin sympathies, Bartolomeo Borghi, former archpriest of Sorbello and a well-known Italian geographer.

After the downfall of Napoleon, the first restoration actions – although formally moving in the direction of a full restoration of the ancien régime – involved radical changes for the Sorbello family: the Treaty of Vienna officially abolished the imperial fiefs that gravitated around the Grand Duchy of Tuscany. Article 100 stated:

[...] The State of the Presidi, the part of the island of Elba and its possessions that were owned by the King of Naples and Sicily before 1801, the principality of Piombino and the abolished fiefs of Montauto, Vernio and Monte Santa Maria will be reunited with the said Grand Duchy […]

— Acte du Congrès de Vienne du juin 1815, avec le pièces qui sont annexées, publié d'apres un des originaux [...], Paris, Librarie Grecque-Latine-Allemande, 1815, pp. 91-92 (translated from french)

The marquises of Monte Santa Maria and Sorbello did not have a representative at the Congress of Vienna, and limited themselves to sending a long memorial to declare the validity of the imperial diplomas. However, past disagreements with the Habsburg-Lorraine grand dukes that took place for a good part of the 18th century weighed heavily: especially those regarding the prerogative of the two marquisate fiefs to be able to offer asylum to any political exile or common delinquent, making them a haven for criminals of all kinds, causing endless troubles and controversies. The Sorbello fief would be claimed by the Grand Duke and reunited with Tuscany, though not immediately: having been excluded from the list of abolished imperial fiefs drawn up in the Treaty of Vienna, as it was erroneously considered an annex of the original imperial fief of Monte Santa Maria, Sorbello remained "silently" in the hands of the family for at least another 4 years. It was incorporated into the boundaries of the Grand Duchy only with an edict promulgated in Sorbello on March 23, 1819. One attempt to explain the reason for this political "oversight" suggests that this omission was dictated by a hidden hope the Viennese chancellors had to preserve some rights over the fief, a hypothesis supported by the Viennese court's offer to recognize the marquis regent of Sorbello as an imperial feudal lord of Austria, and not of the Holy Roman Empire.

At the same time, in the Papal States, starting from Pope Pius VII's motu proprio of July 6, 1816, the restoration moved in the direction of the progressive elimination of most of the privileges granted to the papal nobility, while the remaining privileges could be exercised only at considerably greater expense and always under the direct control of papal delegates and governors. This meant that within a couple of years almost all the nobles gravitating around the court of Rome and its local offshoots gave up their jurisdiction. The death of Pius VII was followed by a period of strong reactions and continual centralizing interference by the Papal States, which led to a gradual "divorce" between the local elites and ecclesiastic political representatives. In these circumstances the nobility began to focus on its private affairs and properties. The days of profitable public offices were a thing of the past, and many nobles became part of the emerging liberal faction, active in the Unification and anti-papal conspiracies. No one in the Sorbello family took this decisive step: the only one to show lukewarm support of the new times was the Marquis Carlo Emanuele III of Sorbello. There are few references concerning prominent public roles played by the Sorbello marquises in the political life of Perugia in the period from 1815 to 1860.

== From the Unification to the present day ==
Although the Marquis Carlo Emanuele III of Sorbello never wanted to take sides openly in the climate of the Unification, he nevertheless took part in the salons and cultural life of Perugia. A cultured man who was in touch with the liberal currents, he received Savoy honors in memory of the old bond established by his ancestors in the previous century. During the tragic events of June 1859, when the repression of the Papal Swiss Guard came down upon the Perugian patriots, forcing them to flee, Carlo Emanuele gave refuge to their leaders in Sorbello castle (now part of Tuscany).

He married a Florentine noblewoman, Ginevra Ramirez di Montalvo (1814–1874), and they had four children: Altavilla, Lodovica, Cecilia and Uguccione. Ginevra, a member of the Tuscan Ramirez di Montalvo family of Spanish origin, was a restless, intelligent and highly cultured woman. It was she who decided to have her three daughters educated by one of the best-known governesses in the cultural circles of Perugia: Assunta Pieralli, renowned also as a poet for her Unification lyric poetry, which would make her one of the voices of the Umbrian Risorgimento.

The untimely death of Uguccione IV Bourbon di Sorbello, the only son of Carlo Emanuele III and Ginevra, at the time a student at the Collegio Pio della Sapienza in Perugia, officially brought an end to the dynastic line of the marquises, which had continued with Carlo Emanuele III and, later, with his brother Tancredi, who died in 1884. The solution to ensure that this centuries-old title would not be lost was put into motion following the marriage between Altavilla Bourbon di Sorbello and Count Giannantonio Ranieri: by the joint decision of various members of the family and backed by a royal dispensation, the family assets of the Sorbellos and the surname was transmitted by female line to the firstborn son, Ruggero, who took on his paternal and maternal titles, thus inaugurating the Ranieri Bourbon of Sorbello branch of the family.

Unlike the previous generations, Ruggero Ranieri di Sorbello (1864–1946) was a very active public personality. A law graduate of the Royal University of Rome in 1889, he was the first among the members of his family to attend a secular state institution instead of a religious one for his education. In the same year he was elected with the Liberals to the Municipality of Perugia, and later he was a councilor for the Municipality of Umbertide (PG). In 1902 he married Romeyne Robert, a young American woman of culture who was involved with women's emancipation and social renewal among the less fortunate classes. The marriage produced three children: Gian Antonio, Uguccione (also called Uguccione V) and Lodovico. Politically he was anti-Giolittian, then Giolittian in 1915; pro-Fascist during the period following World War I and then a dissident of the fascist hierarchy. When he was almost eighty years old he was arrested during the period of the Republic of Salò, to make him reveal the position of his three sons, active anti-Fascists who collaborated with the Allied army.

== Illustrious personalities ==
- Uguccione III Bourbon di Sorbello (1737–1816)

The eldest son of Giuseppe I Bourbon di Sorbello and Marianna Arrigucci, Uguccione III first studied at the Collegio dei Nobili in Urbino and then at the Royal Academy in Turin, which he entered in 1756 at the age of 19, remaining there for three years. He returned to Perugia to take over from his father Giuseppe and uncle Lodovico the responsibilities of managing the fief of Sorbello, of which he became the regent in 1764. In 1766 Charles Emmanuel III of Savoy conferred upon him, by the hand of the Bishop of Perugia, the Cross of Justice of the Order of Saints Maurice and Lazarus. After he married Countess Cecilia Bonaccorsi of Macerata in 1769, he lived stably in Perugia, later purchasing from the Eugeni counts the building on Piazza del Giglio (now Piazza Piccinino), which would become the family's main residence in town. He had the building remodeled to suit his personal tastes, arranging, among other things, a room on the ground floor to be dedicated exclusively to the family library, of which he was the first true cataloger and librarian. He was a profoundly cultured man, dedicated to collecting valuable editions of books, and a lover of music. He also devoted much of his administrative and intellectual commitment to the reorganizing and inventorying of the impressive family archives, continuing the summarizing work begun by his father. As the marquis regent of the family fief, he found himself prudently, shrewdly and diplomatically managing the political storm following the advent of the Jacobin Republic.

- Diomede Bourbon di Sorbello (1743–1811)

Diomede is considered one of the most brilliant men of culture in the family: along with his important diplomatic-military career at the Savoy court in Turin, he was a scholar, bibliophile, man of society and writer. He entered the Royal Academy in 1756, where he met Vittorio Alfieri, with whom he formed a lifelong friendship. An exceptionally brilliant scholar, he was the only one among the seven sons of Giuseppe I to obtain the prestigious title of Baccalauro, devoting himself also to the study of the violin thanks to a benefice given to him by his uncle Tancredi IV. Diomede stayed at the Savoy court for 33 years, where he had a rising and prestigious military career, beginning on March 3, 1766, as an ensign in the King's Guards, and ending as captain of a regiment of Dragoons. He also obtained the position of Lord of the Bedchamber for the king in 1782. During his period in Turin his name appears several times among the affiliates of the Masonic lodges in Turin and Casale. After returning to Perugia in 1789, he married Vittoria Pitti Gaddi, a Florentine noblewoman, in 1790. He then moved to a residence in Florence located near Ponte Santa Trinita, maintaining various contacts, however, with the Perugian cultural circles, and particularly with the scholar Giovan Battista Vermiglioli. In Florence he was able to fully cultivate his bibliophile interests, resuming his friendship with Vittorio Alfieri, who moved to Florence in late 1792, and establishing cultural relations and friendships with the members of the coterie of Louise, Countess of Albany. He died without heirs, bequeathing his vast library to his brother Uguccione III.

- Ugolino Bourbon di Sorbello (1745–1809)

Major Marquis Ugolino left the Royal Academy of Turin as a major in a dragoon's battalion after a career which started with ecclesiastical studies but ended up as a soldier for thirty years in the army, giving up his place in favor of his younger brother. He devoted himself to cultural activities in his old age, keeping away from the family and administrative business. In 1802, he joined the Academy of Fine Arts of Perugia, and bought two boxes at the theater “Pavone. He was fond of book collecting, print collecting, and porcelain collecting, and asked the Ginori porcelain manufactory between 1794 and 1796 to manufacture a fine china service of 400 items.

- Romeyne Robert Ranieri Bourbon di Sorbello (1877-1951)

Romeyne was a member of a family of distant French Huguenot ancestry: the Roberts were in fact originally from La Rochelle, and settled in America in the 17th century. The family became wealthy through its many business, especially in the 19th century. Romeyne was a very talented woman and was interested in social issues: she founded a Montessori school at the Pischiello family estate in order to improve the living conditions of the boys in the Lake Trasimeno area, and a successful embroidery school-workshop. For this she availed herself of the assistance of an important Florentine embroidery artist, Carolina Amari, and the examples of her noblewoman friend Alice Hallgarten Franchetti, the wife of the baron and Senator of the Kingdom Leopoldo Franchetti. This led to the establishment in 1921 of the "Arti Decorative Italiane" (Italian Decorative Arts) cooperative, which remained open until 1934.

Ruggero Ranieri di Sorbello and Romeyne Robert had three children born to them: Gian Antonio, Uguccione and Lodovico.

- Uguccione V Ranieri Bourbon di Sorbello (1906–1969)

Uguccione Ranieri di Sorbello was the second son of Romeyne Robert and Ruggero Ranieri Bourbon di Sorbello and attended the Scuola Allievi Ufficiali (Officer Training School) in Rome, leaving with the rank of Lieutenant. He graduated from the University of Rome in 1928 with a law degree, but showed little propensity for a legal career in law, turning to journalism. From 1930 to 1936 he worked in the United States as a lecturer of Italian language and literature at Yale University, also teaching Italian courses at Middlebury College Summer School and collaborating with numerous Italian-American magazines. Returning to Italy, he embarked on a long career as an official at the newly created Ministry of Popular Culture, later moving first to the Ministry of Tourism and then to Foreign Affairs. As an anti-Fascist, after being called to arms he escaped capture by the Germans and reached the command of the Italian government in Brindisi, passing into service with the Allies. He obtained the rank of captain, and then major, in the service of the IS9 intelligence corps (also called A-Force), involved mainly in missions to rescue Allied prisoners in enemy territory. At the end of the war, he returned to service in Rome, and was sent to the Paris Peace Conference in 1946 as a member of the Italian delegation. In 1948 and 1949 he was an officer at the UNESCO headquarters in Paris.

He married the noblewoman and scholar Marilena de Vecchi Ranieri in October 1951; they would have just one son, Ruggero Ranieri.

From 1952 to 1957 he worked in the United States as the cultural attaché at the Italian Embassy in Washington and the director of the Italian Cultural Institute at the Consulate General of New York, founding The Italian Scene, a cultural and political news bulletin. His work as an official was done alongside his activities as a prolific journalist and writer. He was also a scholar of local and non-local history, often using for his research the documents kept in the family archives, which he arranged to have deposited in the State Archives of Perugia starting in 1951.

Two foundations have been established in his memory: the Fondazione Ranieri di Sorbello, a cultural institution founded by his wife and son in Perugia, at Palazzo Sorbello in Piazza Piccinino, and the Romeyne Robert & Uguccione Sorbello Foundation, an educational trust c(203), established in the United States in 2012.

== See also ==
- Fondazione Ranieri di Sorbello
- Ranieri (family)
- Romeyne Robert Ranieri di Sorbello
- Uguccione Bourbon di Sorbello

== Bibliography and further reading ==
- Angelo Ascani, Monte Santa Maria e i suoi marchesi, Città di Castello, s.n., 1999
- Baldassarre Orsini tra Arte e scienza (1732-1810). Studi e ricerche, Bologna, Pendragon, 2020, pp. 141–154 ISBN 9788833641911
- Biblioteche nobiliari e circolazione del libro tra Settecento e Ottocento. Atti del convegno nazionale di studio, Perugia, Palazzo Sorbello, 29-30 giugno 2001, edited by di Gianfranco Tortorelli, Bologna, Pendragon, 2002 ISBN 9788883421150
- Diego Brillini, Legami tra due dinastie. Tracce dei rapporti tra i casati Bourbon di Sorbello e Bufalini tra XVI e XVII secolo nei rispettivi archivi di famiglia, in Francesca Turini Bufalini e la "letteratura di genere", edited by John Butcher, with a preface of Antonio Lanza, Città di Castello, Edizioni Nuova Prhomos, 2018, pp. 323–349 ISBN 9788868534394
- Diomede Bourbon di Sorbello, Radamisto e Zenobia. Tragedia del signor di Crebillon poeta francese; tradotta in versi italiani dal marchese Diomede Bourbon di Sorbello, manuscript, In Torino, 1775
- Educare la nobiltà. Atti del convegno nazionale di studi, Perugia, Palazzo Sorbello, 18-19 giugno 2004, edited by Gianfranco Tortorelli, Bologna, Pendragon, 2005, pp. 307–346
- Stefano Calonaci, Lo spirito del dominio. Giustizia e giurisdizioni feudali nell'Italia moderna (secoli XVI-XVIII), Roma, Carocci editore, 2017 ISBN 9788843074464
- Stefano Calonaci, Giurisdizione e fedeltà: poteri feudali dentro lo Stato mediceo, in S. Calonaci, A. Savelli (a cura di), Feudalesimi nella Toscana moderna, "Ricerche Storiche", a. XLIV, n. 2–3, pp. 179–207
- Augusto Ciuffetti, Una proprietà nobiliare tra dinamiche patrimoniali e strategie dinastiche: il caso dei Bourbon di Sorbello tra XVII e XIX secolo, in "Proposte e Ricerche", a. XVII, vol. 33, estate-autunno, s.l., s.n., 1994
- Francesco Guarino, L'archivio Bourbon di Sorbello: una fonte non solo per la memoria familiare, in Biblioteche nobiliari e circolazione del libro tra Settecento e Ottocento. Atti del convegno nazionale di studio, Perugia, Palazzo Sorbello, 29-30 giugno 2001, a cura di Gianfranco Tortorelli, Bologna, Pendragon, 2002, pp. 327–360
- Il viaggio mondano del conte Costantino Ranieri in Italia Superiore nel 1727, a cura di Concetto Nicosia; con una nota storica di Marilena de Vecchi Ranieri; con la collaborazione di Gianfranco Tortorelli [Perugia], Uguccione Ranieri di Sorbello Foundation, 2008 ISBN 9788887270273
- Antonella Lignani, Una voce femminile del Risorgimento altotiberino: Assunta Pieralli, in "Pagine Altotiberine" n. 44, a. XV, Città di Castello, Petruzzi editore, 2011, pp. 157–184.
- Cecilia Mori Bourbon di Petrella, Storia di un Feudo Imperiale. I marchesi del Monte tra la Toscana e l'Umbria (sec. X-XIX), Perugia, Volumnia Editrice – Fondazione Ranieri di Sorbello, 2017 ISBN 9788889024843
- Claudia Pazzini, "La Cina su ordinazione". La famiglia Bourbon di Sorbello e la moda delle porcellane cinesi nel XVIII secolo, in Segni di arte cinese tra passato e futuro, a cura di Philip Tinari, 2007, pp. 16–27
- Claudia Pazzini, I marchesi Bourbon di Sorbello collezionisti d'arte nell'Umbria tra il XVII e il XIX secolo, in Casa Museo di Palazzo Sorbello a Perugia a cura di Stefano Papetti e Ruggero Ranieri, Perugia, Uguccione Ranieri di Sorbello Foundation, 2010, pp. 57– 82
- Claudia Pazzini, Maria Montessori tra Romeyne Ranieri di Sorbello e Alice Franchetti: dall'imprenditoria femminile modernista alla creazione del Metodo, Roma, Fefè editore, 2021 ISBN 9788894947403
- Uguccione Ranieri, Sorbello e i suoi marchesi reggenti, Perugia, Fondazione Ranieri di Sorbello, 2017 ISBN 9788887270532
- Rossini e la cultura musicale a Palazzo Sorbello, a cura di Antonella Valoroso e Sara Morelli, Perugia, Fondazione Ranieri di Sorbello, 2018 ISBN 9788887270556
- Marzia Sagini, Il Palazzo Sorbello. Un itinerario di Storia ed Arte nel Settecento Perugino, thesis in History of Art discussed at the University of Florence, Scuola di Studi Umanistici e della Formazione, superviseur prof. Giuseppina Carla Romby, co-superviseur prof. Cristiano Giometti, A.A. 2012/2013
- The House museum of the Palazzo Sorbello in Perugia, edited by Helen Rees Leahy, Perugia, Uguccione Ranieri di Sorbello Foundation, 2010 ISBN 9788887270341
- Antonella Valoroso, Ruggero Ranieri, Uguccione Ranieri di Sorbello. Un intellettuale tra due mondi, Perugia, Morlacchi Editore, 2019 ISBN 9788893921466
