= Assunta (given name) =

Assunta is an Italian feminine given name meaning "assumption". It and another variant, Maria Assunta was originated from the Assumption of Mary, one of the four Marian dogmas of the Catholic Church. Notable people with the name include:

== Assunta ==
- Arcangelo Felice Assunta Wertmuller von Elgg (1928–2021), Italian film director and screenwriter
- Archduchess Assunta of Austria (1902–1993), Austrian princess
- Assunta Cuyegkeng, Filipino professor
- Assunta De Rossi (born 1983), Filipino actress
- Assunta Galeone (born 1998), Italian judoka
- Assunta Legnante (born 1978), Italian shot putter
- Assunta Marchetti (1871–1948), Italian Roman Catholic religious sister
- Assunta Maresca (1935–2021), Italian criminal
- Assunta Meloni (born 1951), Sammarinese politician
- Assunta Ng (born 1951/1952), Chinese-American community organizer
- Assunta Pieralli (1807–1865), Italian poet and teacher
- Assunta Scutto (born 2002), Italian judoka
- Denise Assunta Coia (1952–2020), Scottish psychiatrist and mental health advocate
- Susanna-Assunta Sansone, British-Italian data scientist

== Maria Assunta ==
- Donata Maria Assunta Gottardi (born 1950), Italian politician
- Maria Assunta Chiummariello (born 1958), Italian shot putter
- Maria Assunta Pallotta (1878–1905), Italian Roman Catholic nun
- Maria Assunta Pozio (died 2018), Italian mathematician
- Maria Assunta Accili Sabbatini (born 1955), Italian diplomat

== See also ==
- Assunta Hospital, a first private hospital in Malaysia
- Assunta Panciatichi, a painting by the Italian Renaissance artist Andrea del Sarto
- Rocco D'Assunta (1904–1970), Italian actor, comedian and playwright
