= Assunta =

Assunta may refer to:

- Assunta (given name), an Italian feminine given name
- Assunta Hospital, an hospital in Petaling Jaya, Selangor, Malaysia.

== See also ==
- Assumption of Mary
- Asunta
