= Etruscan Well =

Ancient well in the old town of Perugia

Coordinates: 43°06′46″N 12°23′26″E

Etruscan well
- Pozzo etrusco
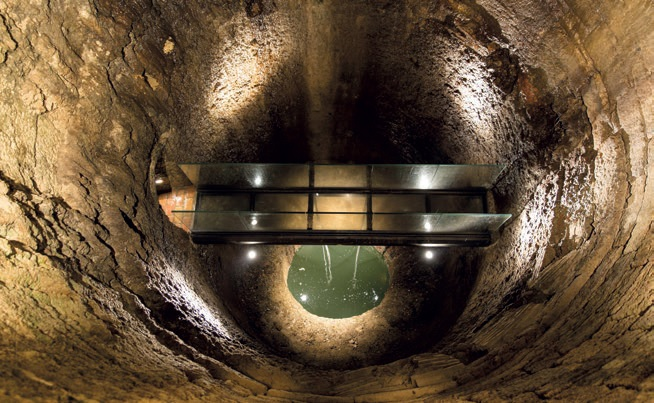
- View of the cistern of the Etruscan well with detail of the walkway
- Established: 2016
- Location: Piazza Danti 18, Perugia, Umbria, Italy
- Type: Archaeology
- Website: Etruscan well

The Etruscan Well, also known as "Sorbello well" from the name of the noble family which still owns the mansion that is home to the structure, is located in the old town of Perugia. The well is currently open to the public as a museum. It can be entered from Piazza Danti n°18, through a covered walkway which leads to the underground sections of Palazzo Sorbello.

== History ==
The Etruscan well is near "Colle del Sole", 477 m above sea level, the highest point in the city of Perugia, where the ancient acropolis of the Etruscan town used to be.

Its construction can be presumably dated to the second half of the 3rd century B.C.; its purpose was probably to ensure an adequate water supply for the population. Over the centuries the structure has been rebuilt several times, beginning in the 15th century, which suggests an uninterrupted use of its water reserve by the local community. Such continuity is actually confirmed by the well curb, in the middle of what is now Piazza Piccinino (formerly Piazza dei Gigli), which indicates the monument at road level.

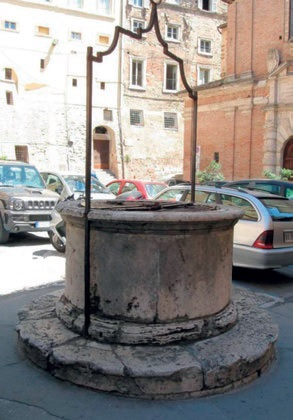
The curb of the Etruscan well, located in Piazza Piccinino, in front of the portal of Palazzo Sorbello.

The well curb, originally used by the population to draw water from the underground tank (presumably dating to the 14–15th cent.), opens between the entrance to Palazzo Sorbello and to the Chiesa della Compagnia della Morte; in the past it has been repeatedly damaged, until recent times. It has been renovated by the Municipality on several occasions, then – following very serious damage which caused part of the railing to collapse to the bottom of the well, to be then recovered in the mid-1960s – a better position for it was found on the lawn in front of the Tempio di Sant’Angelo, where it remained until 1973, the year in which it was relocated.

The history of the Etruscan well in Perugia is inextricably linked with that of Palazzo Sorbello and of its owners, who succeeded each other over time also in the ownership of the well (entrance to which is actually from the underground rooms below the building itself). Palazzo Sorbello, whose construction was originally ordered by Niccolò Montemelini in the 16th century, was partly built on walls of Etruscan origin. It replaced one tower and three houses from the medieval period, whose remains are still in the basement. In 1629 the Palazzo was bought by Diomede degli Oddi, then it became property of the counts Eugeni of Perugia. In 1780, Marquis Uguccione III Bourbon di Sorbello bought the mansion from count Antonio Eugeni, and decided to turn it into his main residence, thus associating the ownership of the Etruscan Well with his family. Even though he unconditionally owned the asset, Uguccione III stipulated that all the residents in the square should have free access to water from the Etruscan Well, which meant that they no longer needed to avail themselves of the public fountains located in the old town.

In 1960, following instructions by Uguccione V Ranieri Bourbon di Sorbello, a first survey was carried out, which led – for the first time – to attributing the construction of the well to Etruscan hydraulic engineering. On the basis of a second survey, which was completed by immersion, Professor Filippo Magi, at the time lecturer in Archaeology and Art History, Etruscology and Italic Antiquities at the Faculty of Letters and Philosophy of the University of Perugia, was able to finally conclude that the Etruscan Well in Perugia was indeed one of the greatest products of Etruscan hydraulic engineering to have been discovered until then.

== Description ==
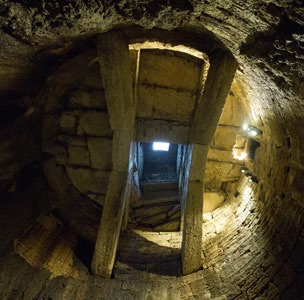
Detail of the travertine "truss" roof of the Etruscan well of Perugia.

The well consists of a cylindrical barrel structure, about 37 m deep, which has been dug into ground mainly consisting of clay and rounded pebbles (which is known in Italian as "tassello mandorlato"). The first 4 m below road level are occupied by a quadrangular room which then extends to a depth of 16 m, resulting in a large tank with a diameter of approximately 5.60 m. The upper section of this structure has a cladding made of large travertine slabs, above which there is a series of stone beams, stuck one into the other without using mortar or lime, forming two "trusses", each of which weighs approximately 8 metric tons, whose purpose is to support the ceiling above, which is also made of large travertine slabs.

Starting from 16 metres below road level, the barrel structure of the well begins to narrow down, reaching a diameter of 3 m.

Initially, to extract water, a system of buckets connected to a rope was used, which is confirmed by the presence of clear-cut grooves on the surface of the travertine block on the ceiling. A system with a central pulley began to be used only later, when an actual iron grid served to seal off the well curb, with the engraved date of 1768, plus the addition of two coats of arms, also made of iron, one of the marquis Bourbon di Sorbello, the other one of the family which previously owned the property, the counts Eugeni.

From a typology perspective, the well can be compared – although it is not exactly alike – to a category of works widespread everywhere, with the same purpose, even if they do not always have the same structure. The homogeneous construction materials and techniques used for the well and for the Etruscan walls around Perugia has led to conclude that, originally, it was intended as a public utility. A similarity with the vaulted ceiling of the Etruscan Well is confirmed by another water tank dating to the Etruscan age, which has also been found in Perugia, at Via Caporali.

During the speleology surveys completed over the years, it has been ascertained that the overall size, including each of its sections, is 424 m^{3} and that it could contain (at full capacity) up to 424,000 litres of water. The well is still working, fed by three perennial springs. In 1996 the structure was emptied in order to complete some photographic surveys.

== Archaeological and tourist site ==
In July 2016 the Sorbello Foundation, a cultural institution with headquarters at Palazzo Sorbello which inherited the assets of the Ranieri Bourbon di Sorbello family, completed work on the restoration and new layout of the entrance rooms; it currently manages the archaeological site as a museum
