= Achille Accili =

Italian politician (1921–2007)

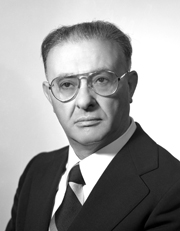

Senator of the Italian Republic
- In office 6 June 1968 – 1 July 1987
- Constituency: Abruzzo

Personal details
- Born: October 19, 1921 Acciano, Italy
- Died: October 14, 2007 (aged 85) Rome, Italy
- Party: Christian Democracy
- Spouse: Maria Castellani
- Children: 4
- Profession: Elementary school teacher

Achille Accili (19 October 1921 – 14 October 2007) was an Italian politician for the Christian Democrats.

== Biography ==
Accili was born on 19 October 1921 in Acciano. Prior to his political career, Accili was a primary school teacher. He was the mayor of his hometown before serving in the Senate.

Accili would serve in the Italian Senate from 1968 to 1987. While serving there, he became a leader of the left leaning component of the Christian Democrats alongside Luciano Fabiani.

Accili was the state secretary for transport within the Andreotti IV Cabinet.

Achille Accili died on 14 October 2007, in Rome.

== Family ==
Accili was married to Maria Castellani. The couple had four children, and their eldest daughter is the diplomat Maria Assunta Accili Sabbatini. His son, Domenico Accili, moved to the United States and became a professor at Columbia University.
