= Fondazione Ranieri di Sorbello =

- Fondazione Ranieri di Sorbello
- Named after: Uguccione Ranieri di Sorbello
- Formation: 2012
- Founder: Ruggero Ranieri di Sorbello; Maria Maddalena de Vecchi Ranieri; Beatrice Visconti di Modrone
- Type: Non-profit
- Headquarters: Palazzo Sorbello, piazza Piccinino 9, 06122 Perugia PG, Italy
- Location: Italy
- President: Ruggero Ranieri di Sorbello
- Website: http://www.fondazioneranieri.org/en/foundation/

The Fondazione Ranieri di Sorbello (FRS) is a not-for-profit organisation with an office in Perugia. It fosters knowledge of Italy's cultural heritage with a special focus on the region of Umbria. The organization was created in memory of Uguccione Ranieri Bourbon di Sorbello.

It replaces and carries on the work of the "Uguccione Ranieri di Sorbello Foundation," which was active from 1995 to 2012.

== Organizational structure ==
The Fondazione Ranieri di Sorbello is regulated by Articles of Association, which indicate its objectives and organizational structure, as well as the positions of the institution and their selection procedures.

It consists of the following positions:

- Board of Directors
- President
- Secretary
- Board of Auditors
- Scientific Committee
- Executive Committee

== Objectives ==
The Fondazione Ranieri di Sorbello pursues aims of public interest by encouraging knowledge of Italian cultural heritage with a special focus on the region of Umbria. It supports restoration work with activities to enhance, conserve and disseminate cultural heritage. Its objectives focus first and foremost on the study of the entire artistic, librarial and document collections with ties to the noble family of the Marquises Ranieri Bourbon di Sorbello of Perugia.

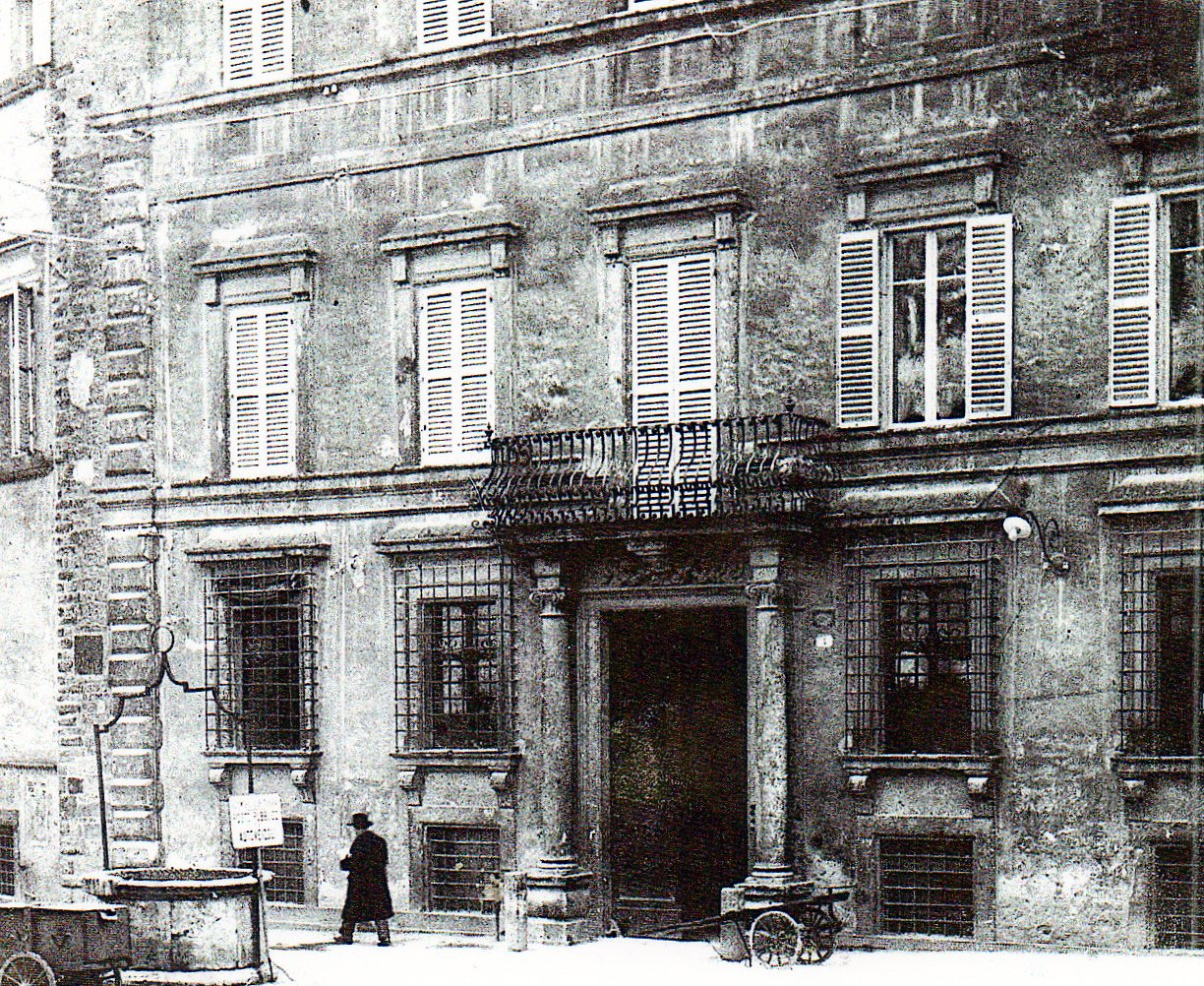
Palazzo Sorbello, late 1940s.

== Location - Palazzo Sorbello (16th-19th centuries) ==
The Fondazione Ranieri di Sorbello is located in Palazzo Sorbello, a historic residence in Perugia first built at the end of the 16th century. From 1780, after Count Antonio Eugeni sold the building to the Marquis Uguccione III Bourbon di Sorbello, the stately mansion became the main family residence of the Marquises Bourbon di Sorbello (later known as Ranieri Bourbon di Sorbello).

The rooms intended for use by the Foundation (administration, storage, library, archive, etc.) are housed on the ground floor and first floor (or "piano nobile").

== History of the institution ==
=== 1995 – 2012: The Uguccione Ranieri di Sorbello Foundation ===
The Uguccione Ranieri di Sorbello Foundation was entrusted with the care of the various documentary, library and art collections belonging to the Ranieri Bourbon di Sorbello family. It was officially founded in 1995 by the heirs of Uguccione Ranieri di Sorbello (1906–1969), writer, diplomat and journalist, who spent his time between Italy and the United States.

The Uguccione Ranieri di Sorbello Foundation was founded on December 28, 1994 when the legal, financial and administrative instruments required for recognition under United States law were prepared. On March 10, 1995 it was granted tax exemption under Section 501 © (4) of the Internal Revenue Code of the United States and was recognized as a Charitable Foundation in the State of New York. In the months that followed, the Foundation was also recognized as a legal body under Italian law [...]

— Ruggero Ranieri, Ten years of activity of the Uguccione Ranieri di Sorbello Foundation: September 1995 – December, Perugia, Uguccione Ranieri di Sorbello Foundation, 2007, p. 3.

The main mission set by the institution's Articles of Association was to encourage not only the study and diffusion of the life and works of Uguccione Ranieri di Sorbello, but also research projects on connected topics (e.g. local history and the Ranieri di Sorbello family history; relationships between Italy and the United States; the development of European integration and topics regarding literary, cultural and artistic events).

From its early days, the Foundation has had a considerable historic-artistic-library heritage, archives, collections and varied art collections. It has worked intensely to file, catalogue, organise and research its collections, especially the numerous deposited archives housed in the main building, inventoried and subsequently opened for consultation, including the vast library collections which make up the Palazzo Sorbello library.

When it opened to the public in 1998, its policy was to provide free access for scholars and promote research, by organising exchanges with Italian and international, cultural and academic institutions and various types of cultural events (conferences and conventions).

After filing and cataloguing the collections of historic and artistic assets over the years, it made them available to scholars worldwide and in order to make them more widely known, it opened the stately mansion rooms to the public for exhibitions and conventions. Over the years, the definitive project to set up a museum tour culminated in the opening to the public of the House Museum in Palazzo Sorbello (2010)

=== 2012 - present: Fondazione Ranieri di Sorbello ===
When the Uguccione Ranieri di Sorbello came to its natural conclusion, in 2012 the activity of the Fondazione Ranieri di Sorbello (FRS) was officially inaugurated. It continued along the lines of the previous institution's objectives, functions and activities, and inherited the historic and artistic purpose to conserve and enhance the tangible and intangible heritage of the Ranieri Bourbon di Sorbello family.

== Activities and projects ==
The FRS has continued to expand the Mission of the "Uguccione Ranieri di Sorbello Foundation" and is committed not only to conserving, protecting and enhancing the original family heritage, but also to activities of research, production and cultural diffusion.

A fundamental part of the Foundation's work is maintaining external relations involving the surrounding area. This includes not only building tourist-museum networks and taking part in exhibitions and events, but also implementing study and popularisation projects together with regional, national and international school and educational institutions, organisations and institutions, as well as with those in the city of Perugia.

=== Museum activities ===
==== Palazzo Sorbello – House Museum (2010) ====
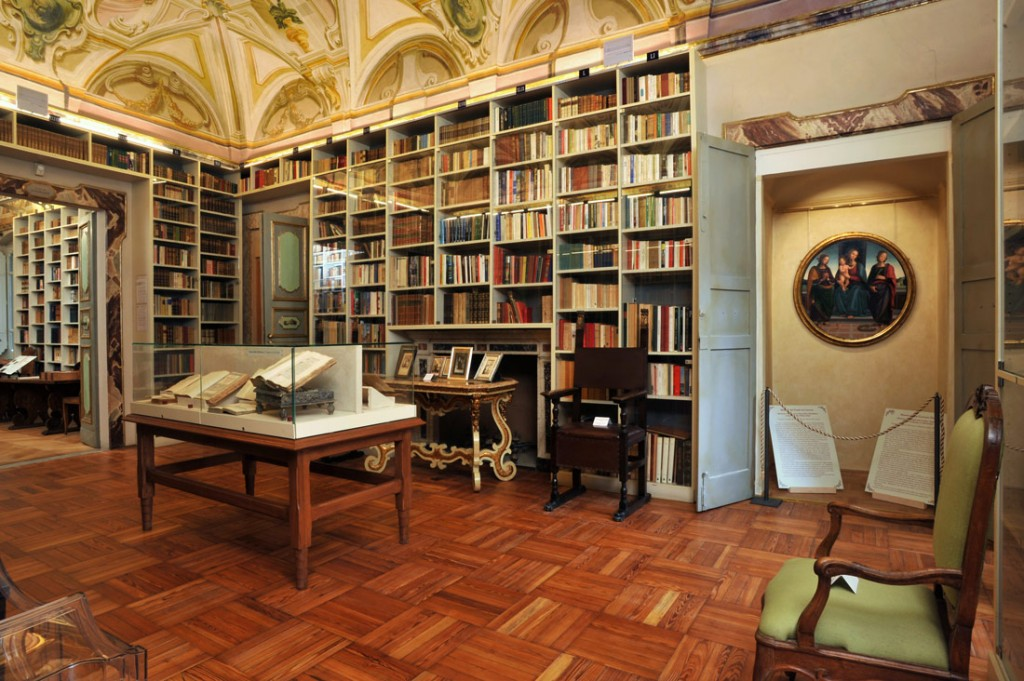
Palazzo Sorbello – House Museum (Diomede Bourbon di Sorbello room)

In partial conclusion of the work to catalogue and make an inventory of the entire artistic heritage, new displays have been set up in some of the rooms on the first floor of Palazzo Sorbello according to museum design criteria. Various pieces from the collections of paintings, period furnishings and decorations in the Ranieri Bourbon di Sorbello heritage have been displayed to follow a historic timeline and grouped according to topic.

The Foundation's art collections first saw the limelight in 1996 with organised, themed exhibitions. The opening to the public of the group of exhibition rooms in Palazzo Sorbello - House Museum «marks the culmination of a process of museum formation over the preceding decade.»

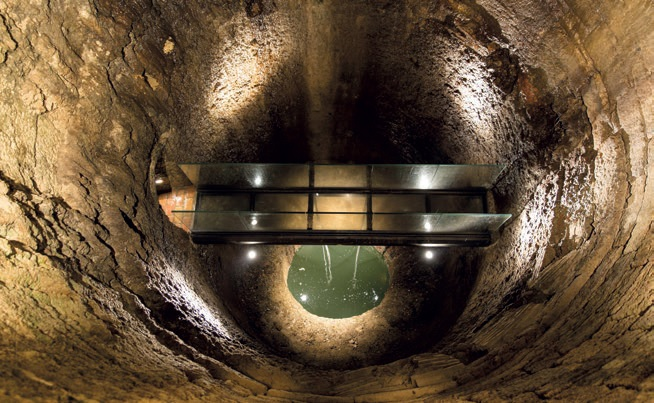
Etruscan Well, view of the water tank.

==== Etruscan Well (2016) ====
Following the donation by the owners, the Fondazione Ranieri di Sorbello absorbed the archaeological site in Perugia into its own property and named it the Etruscan Well.

Once the structure's statics and aesthetics had been restored internally and externally and the site access rooms had been given a new layout with the help of the Municipality of Perugia, Museum management of the site began in 2016.

==== Display sections and exhibitions ====
As a central part of museum management according to the aims of research and enhancement of the Ranieri di Sorbello family collections, the FRS has, from the very start, curated and encouraged display sections by setting up themed tours focusing on the artistic, bibliographic and documentary collections.

In addition to this internal activity, it participates in national events and exhibitions by offering consultancy and loans of works and various materials:

- Idea del Bello: Viaggio per Roma nel Seicento con Giovan Pietro Bellori (Rome, Palazzo delle Esposizioni, 29 March 2000 – 26 June 2000)
- Il Neoclassicismo in Italia. Da Tiepolo a Canova, curated by Fernando Mazzocca, Enrico Colle, Alessandro Morandotti, Stefano Susinno and Liliana Barroero (Milan, Palazzo Reale, 27 February 2002 – 28 July 2002)
- Ottocento Città. Paesi e borghi umbri e dell’Italia Centrale nei dipinti del XIX secolo, curated by the province of Perugia (Spello, Villa Fidelia, 23 December 2003 – 4 March 2004)
- Pittore Imperiale. Pietro Benvenuti alla corte di Napoleone e dei Lorena. (Florence, Palazzo Pitti, Galleria d’Arte Moderna e Galleria Palatina, 10 March 2009 – 21 June 2009)
- Arte e patriottismo nell’Umbria del Risorgimento, curated by Massimo Duranti, Domenico Cialfi, Alessandra Migliorati, Claudia Minciotti Tsoukas, Antonella Pesola, Mario Squadroni (Perugia, Palazzo Cesaroni, 30 October 2011 – 20 December 2011).
- L’altra metà del cielo. Sante e devozione privata nelle grandi famiglie fiorentine nei secoli XVII-XIX, curated by Francesca Fiorelli Malesci, Giovanni Serafini (Florence, Museo di Casa Martelli – Villa La Quiete, 5 December 2014 – 11 April 2015)
- Baldassarre Orsini tra arte e scienza (1732 – 1810), curated by Cettina Lenza (Perugia, Galleria Nazionale dell’Umbria, 14 April – 4 June 2017)
- Tutta l’Umbria una mostra. La mostra del 1907 e l’arte umbra tra Medioevo e Rinascimento, curated by Cristina Galassi and Marco Pierini (Perugia, Galleria nazionale dell’Umbria 11 March – 10 June 2018)

==== Conventions and conferences ====
- Giornata degli Alleati, International study convention, Perugia, 12 January 1999
- Biblioteche nobiliari e circolazione del libro tra Settecento e Ottocento, National study convention, Perugia, Palazzo Sorbello, 29–30 June 2001
- Educare la nobiltà, National study convention, Perugia, Palazzo Sorbello, 18–19 June 2004
- Le biblioteche e gli archivi durante la seconda guerra mondiale, National study convention, Perugia, 1–3 December 2005
- Il viaggio e i viaggiatori in età moderna. Gli inglesi in Italia e le avventure dei viaggiatori italiani, International study convention, Perugia, Palazzo Sorbello, 10–12 May 2007
- I talenti femminili alle origini dell’imprenditoria umbra, Study convention, Perugia, Palazzo della Provincia, 14 March 2012
- Case Museo, famiglie proprietarie e loro collezioni d’arte. Esperienze a confronto / House Museums, the Owners and their Art Collections. Comparing Experiences, International study convention, Perugia, 18–20 April 2012
- Presenza ebraica e feudalità fra Stato pontificio e Granducato di Toscana (sec. XV-XIX), International study convention, Monte Santa Maria Tiberina (PG), 3 October 2012
- Governanti e istitutrici tra Ottocento e Novecento. Ruolo sociale e immagini letterarie / Governesses and Tutors in the 19th and 20th Centuries. Social role and Literary Images, International study convention, Perugia, 24–25 May 2019

==== Publishing ====
The Fondazione Ranieri di Sorbello has continued the publishing business of the Uguccione Ranieri di Sorbello Foundation (1996–2011). The business focuses mainly on producing studies and essays on history, history of art and other topics linked to the Foundation's prerogatives, as set out in the Mission statement (e.g. art catalogues of the collections and temporary exhibitions held at the House Museum; studies on Uguccione Ranieri di Sorbello and the republication of his works, studies and discussions on the historic events of the Second World War in Umbria and Central Italy, etc.).

Similarly, the Ranieri di Sorbello Foundation, together with other publishers, takes part in the publication of articles, essays, catalogues and newspapers, the topics of which cross over with the objectives of study and research set by its Articles of Association.

== National and international ties and collaborations ==
Many of the Fondazione Ranieri di Sorbello's activities and projects are based on collaboration, exchange and integration with various national and international, cultural institutions and associations, and specifically with those interested in historic homes:

- Associazione Italiana Biblioteche (AIB)
- Associazione Dimore Storiche Italiane (ADSI)
- Associazione “AMICI DI DOCCIA”
- House Museum Commission ICOM Italia
- International Committee ICOM DEMHIST

=== The Romeyne Robert and Uguccione Sorbello Foundation (2012) ===
The Fondazione Ranieri di Sorbello maintains an international link with the Romeyne Robert and Uguccione Sorbello Foundation, an organisation founded in 2012. This organisation, in memory of Romeyne Robert (1878–1941) and his son Uguccione Ranieri di Sorbello (1906–1969) aims to create cultural bridges between the United States and Italy via studies and research on topics linked to the Humanities.

== Bibliography ==
- Ruggero Ranieri (edited by), The Foundation and the library: essays and contributions. Proceedings of the first meeting of the advisory board of the Uguccione Ranieri di Sorbello Foundation (Perugia, 8–9 January 1996), translated by Joan Ireland Orfei and Angela Kelly Crea, Working papers of the Uguccione Ranieri di Sorbello Foundation n. 2, Perugia, Uguccione Ranieri di Sorbello Foundation, 1996
- Francesco Guarino, L’archivio Bourbon di Sorbello: una fonte non solo per la memoria familiare, in Gianfranco Tortorelli (a cura di), Biblioteche nobiliari e circolazione del libro tra settecento e ottocento, Bologna, Pendragon, 2002, pp. 327–360
- Laura Zazzerini, Un percorso nella memoria della biblioteca della “Uguccione Ranieri di Sorbello Foundation”, in Gianfranco Tortorelli (a cura di), Biblioteche nobiliari e circolazione del libro tra settecento e ottocento, Bologna, Pendragon, 2002, pp. 361–396
- Ten years of activity of the Uguccione Ranieri di Sorbello Foundation: September 1995 – December, Perugia, Uguccione Ranieri di Sorbello Foundation, 2007
- Helen Rees Leahy (edited by), The House Museum of the Palazzo Sorbello in Perugia, Perugia, Uguccione Ranieri di Sorbello Foundation, 2010
- Pierpaolo Burattini, Quell’aristocrazia viva tra libri e porcellane, da “Il Giornale dell’Umbria”, pp. 32–33
- Ruggero Ranieri, La Fondazione Ranieri di Sorbello, in “Umbria Contemporanea. La cultura in Umbria negli anni della crisi, Rivista di studi storico-sociali”, agosto nn.22-23, 2015, pp. 72–80
- Ruggero Ranieri, Ranieri di Sorbello, Uguccione, in Dizionario del Liberalismo italiano, tomo II, Soveria Mannelli, Rubbettino, 2015, pp. 919–922
- Francesco Trabolotti, Maria Maddalena (Marilena) de Vecchi Ranieri di Sorbello (1921-2013): una scheda biografica, in In memoria di Marilena De Vecchi Ranieri di Sorbello (18/09/1921 – 03/09/2013): testimonianze e interventi sulla sua figura e i suoi studi, Quaderni della Fondazione Ranieri di Sorbello, n. 3, Bologna, Pendragon, 2015
- Franco Ivan Nucciarelli, Francesca Romana Cappelletti (edited by), The Etruscan Well, Perugia, Fondazione Ranieri di Sorbello, 2016
