= Asunta =

Asunta may refer to:

== Places ==
- La Asunta, town in Bolivia.
- La Asunta Municipality, municipality in Bolivia.

== Other ==
- Asunta Limpias de Parada (1915–1995), a Bolivian composer
- Betty Asunta Tejada Soruco (born 1959), a Bolivian politician
- Heikki Asunta (1904–1959), a Finnish writer
- Mikko Asunta (1911–2005), a Finnish politician
- Murder of Asunta Basterra, 2013 murder in Spain
  - The Asunta Case, a Spanish miniseries based on the murder of Asunta Basterra

== See also ==
- Assunta
