= Catherine Bandle =

Swiss mathematician

Catherine Bandle (born 22 March 1943) is a Swiss mathematician. She is known for her research on differential equations, including semilinear elliptic equations and reaction-diffusion equations, as well as for her book on isoperimetric inequalities. She is a professor emerita of mathematics at the University of Basel.

== Education and career ==
Bandle completed her doctorate (Dr. math.) at ETH Zurich in 1971. Her dissertation, Konstruktion isoperimetrischer Ungleichungen der mathematischen Physik aus solchen der Geometrie, concerned isoperimetric inequalities and was jointly supervised by Joseph Hersch and Alfred Huber. Like Alice Roth before her, she received the ETH Silver Medal for her dissertation, and she continued at ETH Zurich for a habilitation in 1974. She was the first woman mathematician and one of the earliest women to earn a habilitation at ETH Zurich. She became a professor at the University of Basel in 1975 and remained there until her retirement in 2003. She has studied destabilized elliptic equations with her friend and collaborator Maria Assunta Pozio.

=== Isoperimetric Inequalities and Applications ===
Bandle is the author of the book Isoperimetric Inequalities and Applications (Pitman, 1980). It was only the second book to study the applications of isoperimetric inequalities in mathematical physics, after the 1951 book Isoperimetric Inequalities in Mathematical Physics by George Pólya and Gábor Szegő, and at the time of its publication was considerably more up-to-date on recent developments in the subject. In 2023, Bandle published the book Shape Optimization - Variations of Domains and Applications together with Alfred Wagner from RWTH Aachen University.
