= Antonio Lanza =

Italian philologist and historian (born 1049)

Antonio Lanza (born 1949 in Rome) is an Italian philologist and historian, best known for his contributions on the history of jazz in the Treccani encyclopaedia and his expertise on the rivalry between Dante Alighieri and Forese Donati. He is a graduate of the University of L'Aquila.
