= Maria Assunta Accili Sabbatini =

Italian diplomat

Ambassador Maria Assunta Accili Sabbatini
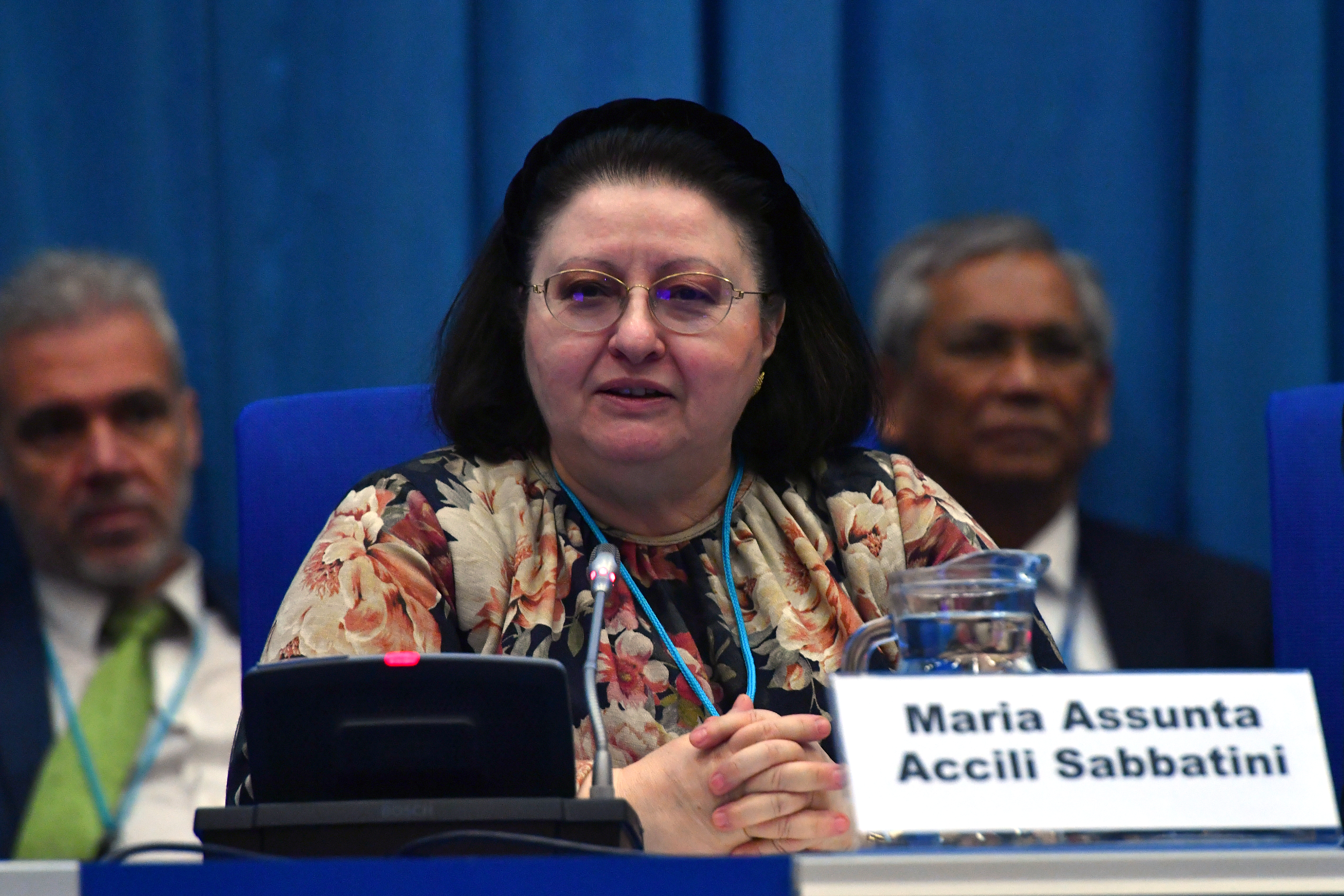

Italian Ambassador to Hungary
- In office 2012–2016
- Preceded by: Giovan Battista Campagnola
- Succeeded by: Massimo Rustico

Personal details
- Born: 16 November 1955 (age 70) L'Aquila, Italy
- Parent: Achille Accili
- Education: Sapienza University of Rome (undergrad); College of Europe (postgrad)

Maria Assunta Accili Sabbatini (born 16 November 1955) is an Italian diplomat.

== Biography ==
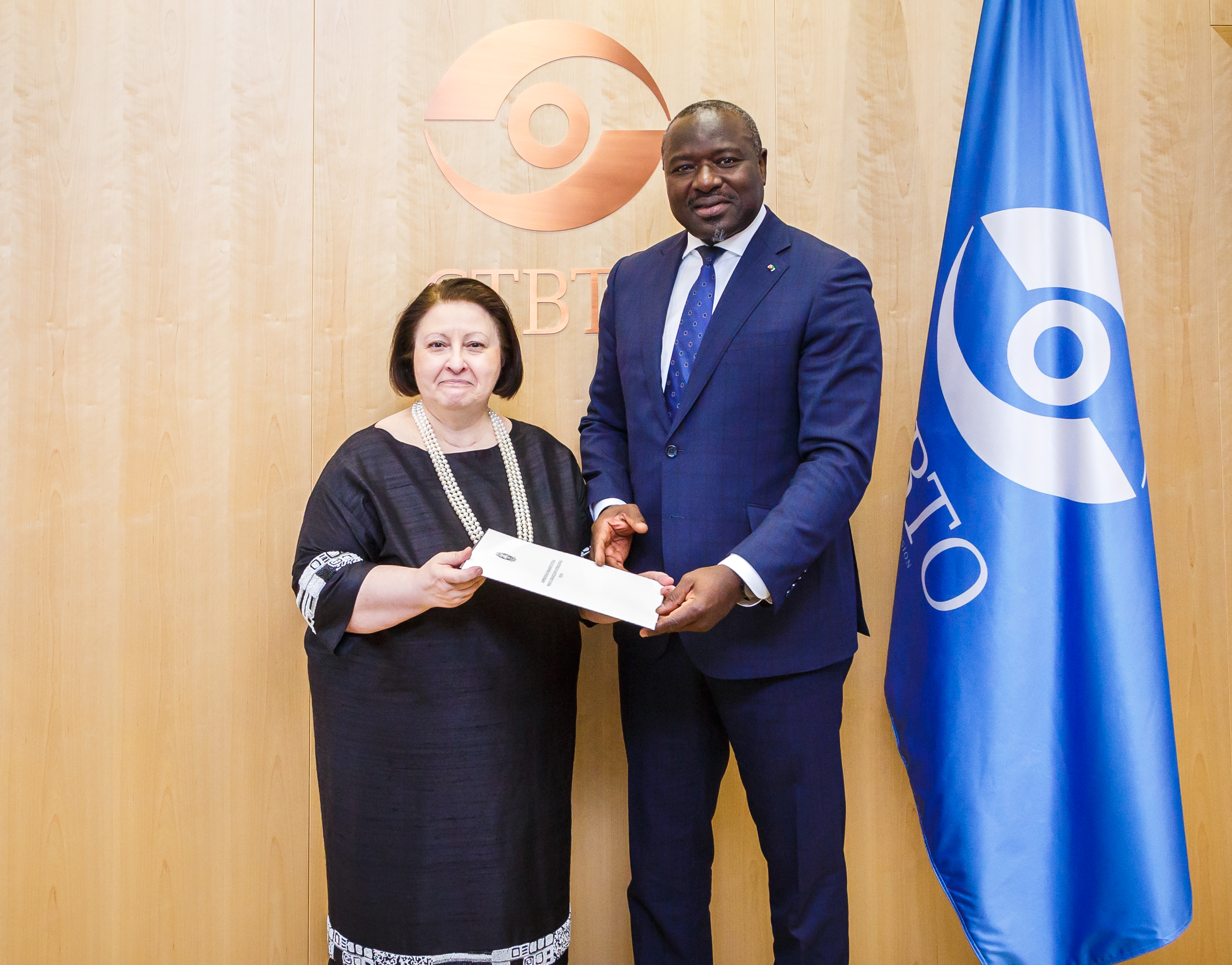
Maria Assunta Accili Sabbatini presented with credentials by the Republic of Italy

Maria Assunta Accili Sabbatini was born in L'Aquila on 16 November 1955 to Maria Castellani and Achille Accili. Accili Sabbatini holds a degree in political science from the University of Rome La Sapienza, and a postgraduate degree in 'Management of Public Organizations' from Collège d'Europe of Bruges, Belgium.

Accili Sabbatini's diplomatic career began in 1980. She has been posted to Rabat, the Italian embassies in China and Pakistan, and to the Permanent Mission of Italy to OECD. Between 2003 and 2007, Accili Sabbatini was Italian representative to Taiwan. Beginning in 2012, she was Ambassador to Hungary. She was named the Permanent Representative of Italy to the United Nations (Vienna), Ambassador Extraordinary and Plenipotentiary in November 2016. She also serves as the permanent representative of Italy to the International Atomic Energy Agency.

== Family ==
Accili Sabbatini's father, Achille Accili, was an Italian Senator who had 4 children; of whom she is the eldest. Her brother, Domenico Accili, went on to become a medical professor at Columbia University.

== Honors ==
Grand Officer of the Order of Merit of the Italian Republic – December 27, 2006

== See also ==
- Ministry of Foreign Affairs (Italy)
- Foreign relations of Italy
