= Assunta Pieralli =

Italian poet

- Born: 1807; Lippiano, Italy
- Died: 31 October 1865 (aged 57–58); Perugia Italy
- Occupations: Poet and educator
- Known for: Poetry supporting the Risorgimento
- Parents: Giuseppe Pieralli (father); Francesca Capacci (mother)

Assunta Pieralli (1807 – 31 October 1865) was an Italian poet and teacher who actively supported the Italian unification movement known as the Risorgimento.

== Life ==
She was born in Lippiano, in the province of Perugia, Italy, to Giuseppe Pieralli and Francesca Capacci, who were well off financially. She had three brothers.

=== Education ===
Her education began in her family's library with the help of some friends of her brother Ottavio, a parish priest in the nearby village of San Giuliana. They gave her lessons in Latin.

Later, Antonio Lignani, an educated man who had proposed the cathedral of Città di Castello, discovered Pieralli's talents and introduced her to the academic environment. Then, as an adult, she met two other accomplished men who significantly influenced her education: Antonio Mezzanotte, an antiquarian and classicist, and Averardo Montesperelli, who taught her French.

=== Risorgimento ===
Pierelli became well known for her "patriotic poetry" in support of the Risorgimento, the multi-decade Italian revolutionary movement that, in 1871, finally united the many separate states on the Italian Peninsula into a single Kingdom of Italy. Her goal, and that of other published women of her time, was "to form a new class of young, educated and politically committed women."

Her dedication to the cause was complete, according to Treccani,

In 1848, Pieralli was called to collaborate on La donna italiana, a militant periodical that was published in Rome with the intention of involving women in the revolutionary process of the Risorgimento and which made use of a decisive female contribution, despite being directed by a man, the journalist and writer Cesare Bordiga. Here Pieralli published two patriotic poems, On the Sacred War of Italian Independence and In Death of Baron Pompeo Danzetta of Perugia, captain adjutant in the Roman legions who fell in the battle of Cornuda on 9 May 1848, respectively in the issues of 10 June and 1 July 1848.

=== Governess ===
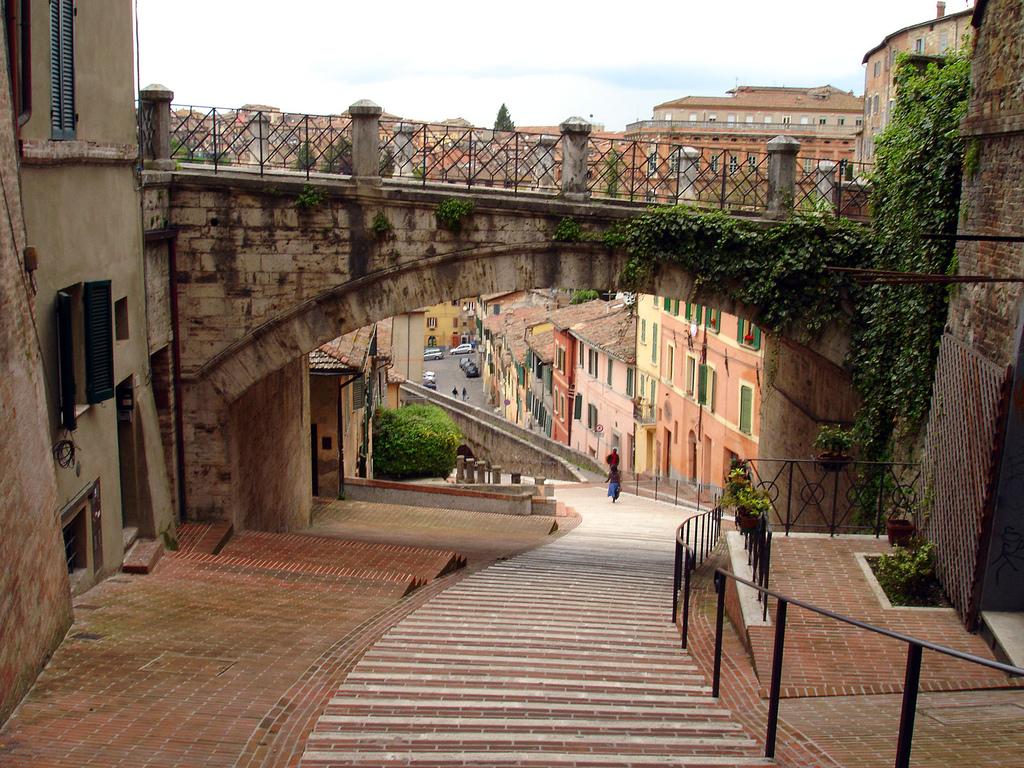
Medieval aqueduct in Perugia.

According to Tortorelli, Carlo Emanuele II of Sorbello and his wife Ginevra Ramirez di Montalvo engaged Pieralli to be governess to his three daughters, Altavilla, Ludovica and Cecilia, and she proved to be exceptional at the task. Sorbello was known to appreciate Pieralli's political awareness, grand temperament, intelligence and modern views for the Risorgimento. According to Treccani,

Pieralli belonged to the female intellectuality which, in the central decades of the nineteenth century, combined poetic expression with civic and pedagogical commitment, becoming the protagonist of the process of national unification.... The geographically and socially peripheral condition of Pieralli, who lived in the province of the Papal State, far from the most important publishing centers and in a subordinate role, as a simple governess, meant that many of her compositions remained unpublished, entrusted to hand transcription. The Augusta library in Perugia preserves a fair group of printed texts, mostly occasional poems, several of which are dedicated to members of the Ranieri di Sorbello family. A posthumous choice of poetic texts, which at the time appeared on scattered or strenuous sheets, especially Umbrian, was published in Perugia in 1890 on the initiative of a student, Celeste Ghirga Rossi

=== Teacher ===
In 1861, she was asked to teach history and geography at the normal female school of Perugia, set up by the unitary government and then directed by Giovanni Pennacchi. Pieralli's name appears today on the Institute of Higher Education “Assunta Pieralli” in Perugia,

She died there on 31 October 1865.
