= Monte Santa Maria Tiberina =

- Comune
- Comune di Monte Santa Maria Tiberina
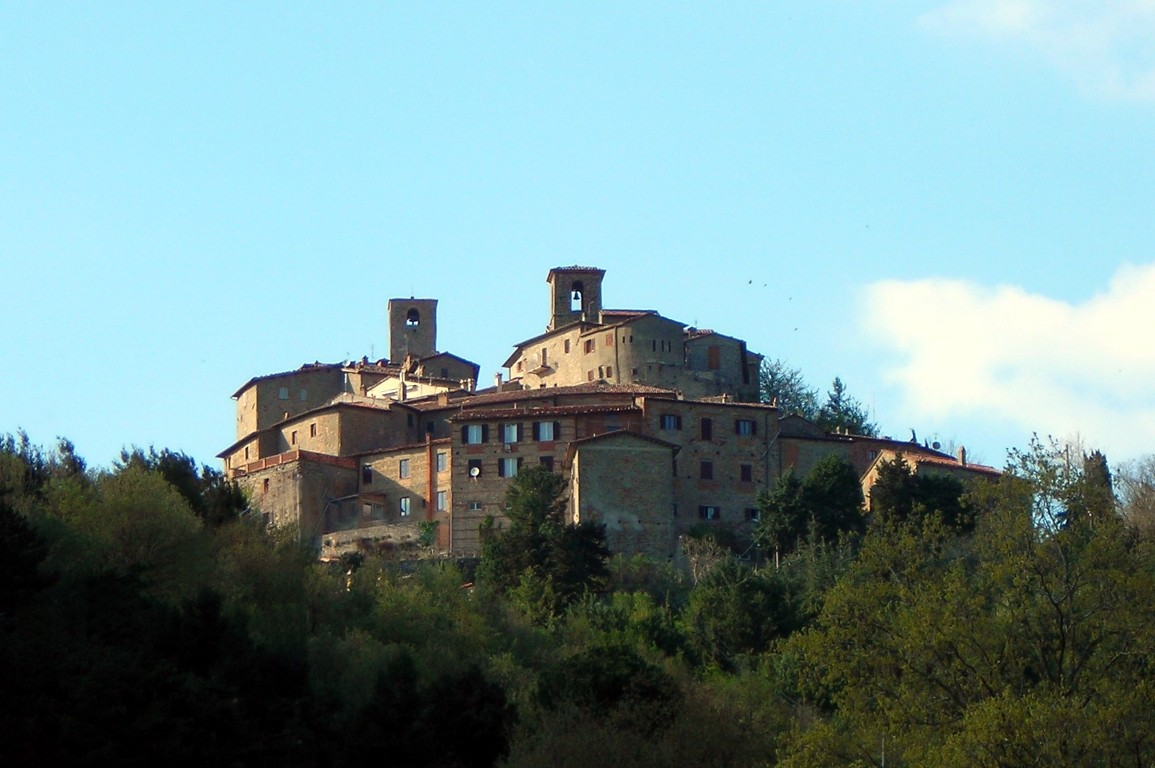
- View of Monte Santa Maria Tiberina

- Coat of arms

- Location within Italy Location within Umbria
- Coordinates: 43.436803°N 12.162676°E
- Country: Italy
- Region: Umbria
- Province: Perugia (PG)

Government
  - Mayor: Letizia Michelini

Area
  - Total: 72.1 km^{2} (27.8 sq mi)
- Elevation: 688 m (2,257 ft)

Population (1 January 2025)
  - Total: 1,060
  - Density: 14.7/km^{2} (38.1/sq mi)
- Demonym: Monteschi
- Time zone: UTC+1 (CET)
  - Summer (DST): UTC+2 (CEST)
- Postal code: 06010
- Dialing code: 075
- Patron saint: Assumption of Mary
- Saint day: 15 August
- Website: Official website

Monte Santa Maria Tiberina is a comune (municipality) in the province of Perugia in the Italian region Umbria, located about 40 km northwest of Perugia.

== History ==
From at least the 11th century, the area was ruled by the marquesses who took the name of Bourbon del Monte Santa Maria. They belonged to the imperial marquesses who held authority in Tuscany from at least 1014. Among the most notable were Ranieri I and Ranieri II. Ranieri II had a son, Ranieri III, who in turn had two sons, Ugo (also called Uguccione) and Guido.

In 1198, the local castle was destroyed during a conflict involving Pope Innocent III, but it was soon rebuilt, and the ruling family continued to shape the town's development for centuries.

The Marquisate of Monte Santa Maria remained under the control of different branches of the same family until 1815, with the exception of the Napoleonic period. French forces occupied the area in 1798 and incorporated it into the Department of Trasimeno. Control briefly returned to the Bourbon del Monte in 1805, but subsequent incorporation of Tuscany into the French Empire ended their rule.

Following the Restoration in 1814, the former order was briefly reinstated before the territory was definitively absorbed into the Grand Duchy of Tuscany in 1815, bringing an end to nearly a thousand years of feudal authority. In 1816, a decree of the Grand Duke established Monte Santa Maria Tiberina as an autonomous municipality. The municipal seat was placed at Lippiano, a decision that led to long-standing tensions between Lippiano and Monte Santa Maria Tiberina.

In 1895, Monte Santa Maria Tiberina had a population of 3,197 inhabitants.

Disputes between Lippiano and Monte Santa Maria Tiberina over the location of the municipal seat resurfaced in the early 20th century. Although the municipal council voted in 1914 to move the seat to Monte Santa Maria Tiberina, the offices remained in Lippiano.

From 1861 until 1927, the municipality formed part of the Province of Arezzo. On 31 March 1927 it was transferred to the Province of Perugia, to which it still belongs.

After the town was liberated in 1944, the municipal seat was permanently transferred from Lippiano to Monte Santa Maria Tiberina.

== Geography ==
Monte Santa Maria Tiberina stands at the summit of the mountain from which it takes its name, at an elevation of 688 metres (2,257 ft) above sea level. At the southern base of the mountain flows the Aggia stream, and at the northern base the Erchi stream; both are tributaries of the Tiber.

The surrounding territory includes woodlands and chestnut groves, as well as natural pastures, cultivated fields, and vineyards. Truffles and mushrooms are gathered in abundance during favorable seasons. The highest mountain in the area is Monte Marzana.

=== Subdivisions ===
The municipality includes the localities of Casalino, Ciciliano, Gabbiano, Gioiello, Lippiano, Marcignano, Monte Santa Maria Tiberina, Palazzo, Prato, Ranzola, Trevine.

In 2021, 580 people lived in rural dispersed dwellings not assigned to any named locality. At the time, the most populous locality was Gioiello (229), while Monte Santa Maria proper had a population of 64.

== Religion and culture ==
The parish church of Santa Maria, from which the town derives its name, remains the principal church of the community. The dedication also gave its name to the marquesses of Monte Santa Maria, who were once known as "del Colle".

=== Church of Santa Maria and Bourbon Chapel ===
The Church of Santa Maria was built in the early 11th century and retains a simple stone façade reflecting its Romanesque origins. The bell tower, although also Romanesque in style, is a 19th-century addition following the collapse of the original structure.

The interior is laid out on a Latin cross plan with five trusses supporting the roof. On the left wall stands an octagonal baptismal font in sandstone dating to the 16th century, decorated with various symbols including the coat of arms of the Bourbon del Monte marquises, carved on a leonine pedestal.

On the right wall, within a small chapel, is a stone slab from the 12th century bearing imagery related to the Old and New Testaments. Further along, a wrought iron gate from the 16th century gives access to the Bourbon family chapel, erected in 1613 by Marquis Gianbattista Bourbon del Monte.

The high altar, first recorded in a pastoral visit of 1784, is in Baroque style and made of pietra serena. It houses a wooden sculpture of the Madonna and Child, attributed to an unknown 14th-century artist. Since the Middle Ages, the figure has been regarded not only as protector but also as the symbolic "first Castellan" of the town; it bears the silver keys of the settlement, which are traditionally offered to the Virgin during the feast of the Ascension, the principal local festival, when the statue is carried in procession around the town walls.

In the left chapel of the altar is the exterior portion of a 16th-century sandstone sarcophagus set into the wall, while another sarcophagus of early Christian date serves as the base of the modern altar. A wooden trapdoor near the high altar leads to the crypt, formerly used for burials until the Napoleonic period, where tombs and human remains are still present.

=== Palazzo Bourbon del Monte ===
The Palazzo Bourbon del Monte, located in Piazza Castello in the historic centre, houses the Palazzo Museo di Monte Santa Maria.

The palace was constructed between 1564 and 1614 on the site of earlier castle structures. Its building was initiated by the marquis Bartolomeo and continued by his son Gianbattista. In 1894 the palace, together with all the estates at Monte Santa Maria, was sold by the marquis Gianbattista Francesco to the marquises Capranica del Grillo. Following the sale, the complex entered a period of abandonment. In 1944 the building suffered heavy damage as a result of bombings during World War II.

The museum presents the history of the Bourbon del Monte family and their marquisate, which was an imperial fief from 1250 to 1815, as well as its relationship with the town and the surrounding Upper Tiber Valley. The museum also features an archaeological section displaying finds from the local territory.
