= Uguccione Ranieri di Sorbello =

Italian journalist

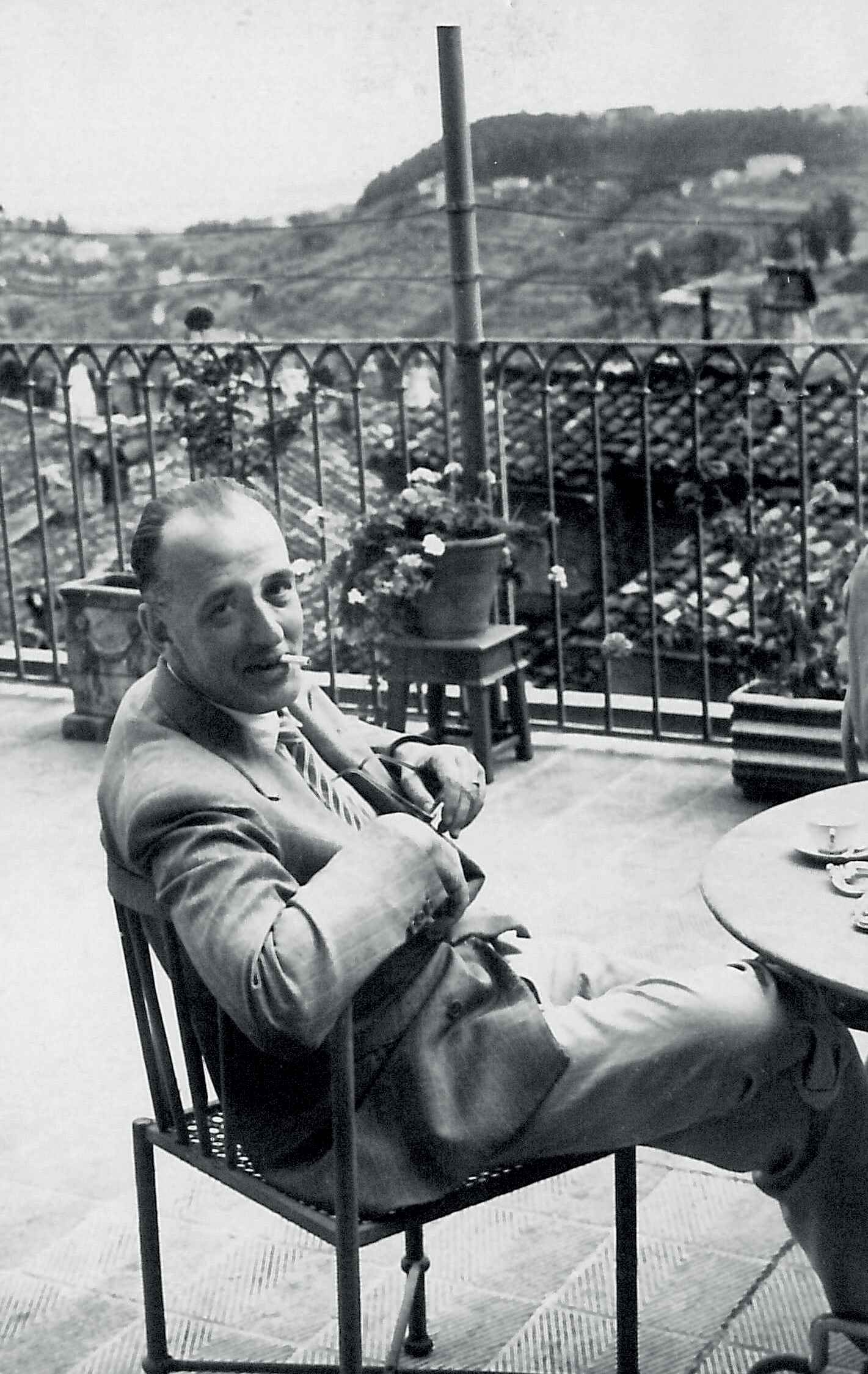
Uguccione Ranieri on the terrace of Palazzo Sorbello in Perugia, ca.1960

Uguccione Ranieri Bourbon del Monte di Sorbello (22 February 1906 – 28 May 1969), better known as Uguccione Ranieri di Sorbello, or simply Uguccione Ranieri, was an Italian scholar, journalist and writer; he was also a war hero and a Public Administration official and director at the Ministry of Popular Culture, Tourism and Entertainment based at the Ministry of Foreign Affairs. He was a member of the noble Ranieri Bourbon di Sorbello family, with the title of marquis of Sorbello and count of Civitella.

== Early life and education ==
Uguccione Ranieri di Sorbello was the second son of the marquis Ruggero V Ranieri Bourbon di Sorbello (1864-1946) and an american woman, Romeyne Robert (1877-1951). Uguccione’s earliest schooling followed the Montessori method, in keeping with the wishes of his mother, who was active in the field of social promotion and was the founder of a rural school inspired by Montessori educational practices. In 1924 he enrolled in law school in Rome, and he began to collaborate with various Roman periodicals. In 1926 he interrupted his university studies to do military service, initially at the Scuola Allievi Ufficiali of Rome (anti-aircraft artillery department) and later at Forte Belvedere in Florence, where he rose to the rank of Second Lieutenant.

In 1928 he graduated in Rome with a degree in Law, and the following year he earned a second degree in Political Science from the University of Florence. He immediately began working as a clerk with a Roman law firm, but it was a short-lived experience. Uguccione soon abandoned the idea of becoming a lawyer in order to follow his passion for literature and the humanities. The decision to abandon his legal career was not welcomed by his father, marquis Ruggero Bourbon di Sorbello, who cut off his support with the clear intention of making his son come to his senses, forcing him to return to Perugia, the city where the family lived. It was in this climate of generational tension that the conditions would ripen for a decision that would mark a fundamental turning point in Uguccione’s life: leaving Italy to move to the United States.

== The first period in the United States (1930-1936) ==
After a first exploratory trip to the United States in 1929 to gather information and check on work opportunities at North American universities, in the 1930-31 academic year Uguccione obtained a position as an instructor of Italian language and literature in the Italian Department of Yale University. Having entered the cultural life of the town of New Haven, Connecticut, he was active in the Yale Italian Society and with the city’s Circolo Italiano, where he was invited to hold several conferences on Italian art and literature. Starting in 1932, the Circolo Italiano of Boston invited him to lecture regularly on Italian literature. Interested in theater as a means for promoting the learning of the italian language, he wrote and staged, in collaboration with the University of Yale theater company, the one-act comedy Con le signore c'è più gusto (It’s More Fun with Ladies), performed in italian by Yale students on May 3, 1934. Two years later the play was published by Italian Publishers in New York.

From 1934 to 1936 Uguccione also taught at the Italian Summer School at Middlebury College, where he developed a course called “Modern Italy in Word and Thought.” He made the acquaintance of Giuseppe Prezzolini, then professor of Italian Literature at Columbia University and director of the Casa Italiana from 1930 to 1940, who invited him to join the editorial staff of Casa Italiana’s Giornalino, a magazine for students and teachers of Italian in the United States. His interest in journalism was also expressed in his editorial contributions to two magazines, both publications of the Italy-America Society: Italy America Monthly and Italy America Review, of which he was managing editor in 1936.

== The MinCulPop years and the anti-Fascist conspiracy ==
Returning to Italy in 1937, Uguccione began working with a temporary contract at the newly created Ministry of Popular Culture (MinCulPop); he was then hired the following year, with the title of First Secretary. He worked specifically with radio broadcasts in English, relations with the foreign press, and censorship. Although he was becoming increasingly intolerant of Mussolini’s regime, he was forced to keep his job out of economic necessity, eventually leaving his duties with the radio office and transferring to the foreign press general management, where he handled the administrative and personal affairs of foreign journalists, especially american journalists who remained in Italy until Mussolini’s declaration of war against the United States on December 11, 1941.

He was called back to military service in November 1942 and sent to the base in Caserta, returning to Rome shortly afterward through the direct involvement of Princess Marie-José of Savoy, who most likely acted at the request of Uguccione’s mother, Romeyne Robert, who was acquainted with the princess. Uguccione later took part in the anti-Fascist conspiracy that revolved around the figure of Marie-José. Uguccione later recalled in some of his autobiographical writings the key role played by Marie-José:

She surrounded herself with anti-Fascists to help her save the monarchy from the abyss toward which Mussolini was dragging it and the nation. In many long talks with the Princess I proposed various possibilities for action (assassination of the tyrant and a coup d’etat in the Quirinale, a flight for her and her son to reach the Allied troops that had already landed in Sicily, etc.). Meanwhile the other plots took shape – that of the Grand Council and that of Badoglio – and then came July 24, 1943.

(From writings by Uguccione Ranieri di Sorbello.)

Edgardo Sogno also recalled how, in the spring of 1943, he, Uguccione and a group of liberal monarchists wrote an appeal to the king, asking him to depose Mussolini. Despite this, according to Sogno, Uguccione had long since lost faith in the monarchy, and subsequent events only confirmed his republican convictions. These would emerge strongly in the period immediately following the war, when Uguccione publicly sided with the Republic on the occasion of the institutional referendum held on Sunday and Monday, June 2–3, 1946 to choose whether Italy would remain a monarchy or become a republic after World War II.

== Involvement with the Allies (1943-45) ==
Following the announcement of the armistice on September 8, 1943, Uguccione deserted, heading south and taking refuge at the villa of his friends Zeno and Andreola Vinci in Cupra Marittima. On the night of October 5 he carried out his first mission, rescuing a group of Jewish fugitives in Allied territory, using a makeshift boat to reach the Tremiti Islands. With the consent of the Italian General Staff, Uguccione joined the Allied IS 9, an extension of the British MI9, or Military Intelligence Section 9, and its American counterpart. The MI9 was created in December 1940 with the task of supporting European resistance fighters in the territories occupied by the Nazi/Fascists to recover Allied soldiers in enemy territory, as well as to communicate with prisoners in POW camps, providing them with every possible assistance. The IS9, often called the A-Force in the Mediterranean zone, had the specific mission of helping Allied prisoners to escape, which was also done through the training of special agents to be sent into enemy territory. The IS9 network developed its activities in various parts of the Italian peninsula, especially along the Eastern Alps, where it was mainly a question of rescuing the crews of Allied bombers shot down by enemy antiaircraft, and in the areas between the Marche and Abruzzi regions, where there was a high concentration of escaped prisoners.

Uguccione remained in the Marche region from the winter of 1943 to the spring of 1944 to organize an escape route (“Ratline”), which helped hundreds of Allied prisoners (about 900 British/American soldiers, Yugoslav soldiers, Italian refugees, Jews, etc.) to escape.

After the liberation of the Marches, he moved to the Arezzo front, and in July 1944 he participated in the battle of Florence. Later, after hurried training in Brindisi to prepare for a mission in the Alps, on the night between April 4 and 5 he parachuted into the Monte Pizzoc area in the Eastern Alps, together with an English lieutenant and an Italian radio operator (Operation Spider). There, together with the partisans of the Garibaldi “Nino Nannetti” Division, he managed to unite and bring to safety a large group of missing American airmen and to capture more than a thousand German soldiers. In the late stages of the war, he was sent to Austria to organize the first aid to the prison camps abandoned by the Germans in the area between Klagenfurt and Graz, where it was estimated that almost 40,000 Allied soldiers were held. His deeds during the war of liberation earned him commendations and decorations: on his return to Italy, in April 1945, he was decorated with the Silver Medal of Military Valor. In 1949 he was also awarded a bronze medal.

== The post-war years ==
=== 1946-1952: Political involvement ===
After the war, Uguccione returned to Rome, initially establishing contacts with the Presidency of the Council of Ministers and obtaining several positions in liaison with the Ministry of Foreign Affairs before being appointed to the newly-created Ministry of Tourism and Entertainment in 1960. In 1946 Uguccione provided his services as a press officer for the Italian delegation at the Paris Conference, where he translated Alcide De Gasperi’s speech into English for foreign journalists, for which he earned their praise.

Uguccione was an active participant in the cultural life of the newly liberated Rome. His small apartment in the capital, at Via dei Due Macelli no. 31, became a sort of intellectual and social hub, frequented by various personalities who constituted, or would constitute, the political, literary and journalistic elite of the post-war period: Giuseppe Antonio Borgese, Ugo Stille, Luigi Barzini, Alberto Moravia, Giannalisa Feltrinelli, Marina and Anna Maria Volpi, the writer Dino Terra, along with various well-known musicians, actors and politicians. Longtime friends included count Edgardo “Eddy” Sogno, Maurizio Lodi-Fè and Indro Montanelli.

His close association with his friend, the writer and journalist Donato Martucci, which began in the 1930s, bore fruit in the form of two of his most original creations in 1948 and 1950: the political fantasy novels Non votò la famiglia De Paolis and Lo strano settembre 1950, both published by Longanesi, which were greatly successful both in Italy and abroad.

In the years from the immediate post-war period up to 1952, Uguccione also showed a strong political commitment: he wrote articles for the magazine The Italian Post, edited by Pierluigi Tumiati, and at the time of the Monarchy/Republic referendum, he immediately sided with the republic, recalling the actions of the king at the time of the September 8th armistice and speaking strongly in support of the anti-Fascist and partisan resistance struggle. In this period Uguccione took a strongly liberal and democratic stance, hoping for social and economic renewal for Italy. He later established ties with the World Movement for World Federation Government, of which Giuseppe Antonio Borgese and his wife Elisabeth Mann were supporters and organizers. He became a member of the Executive Committee of the Italian section, working with the group’s two magazines, Notizie federaliste mondiali and Federalismo nel mondo, participating in conferences and events. He soon forsook his active militancy in the movement, the influence of which would also decline rapidly in the following years.

=== Return to the United States (1953) – The Italian Scene ===
In 1953 Uguccione began his second long period in the United States, following his appointment as the cultural attaché at the Italian Embassy in Washington with the task of managing the cultural office at the Consulate General of Italy in New York. The purpose of this office, located at 690 Park Avenue, was to provide information on Italy to anyone who requested it, and above all to promote positive relations between the United States and the Italian Republic, presenting Italy in its new identity as modern democratic country. It was within this context that the informational bulletin The Italian Scene was established. This was a 15-page monthly publication written in English, the decidedly ambitious purpose of which was to make the complexity of Italian political and cultural life comprehensible to the English-speaking world, including professionals working in the field of communication among its privileged audience.

In the pages of The Italian Scene Uguccione told about the Italy of the 1950s-60s, providing its readers with latest important news, but also speaking about unusual events, ranging from politics to archeology, literature, cinema, science, music, theater, radio, television, architecture and editorial news. The success of this original publication among the readership of insiders earned him the praise of numerous Italian and foreign communication professionals, including the journalist and writer George Weller (1907‑2002), winner of the Pulitzer Prize in 1943 and director of the Chicago Daily News office in Rome in the 1950s.

In addition to his editorial duties for The Italian Scene, Uguccione had many other official tasks, including debates, conferences, interviews and trips to various parts of the United States. Starting in 1954 Uguccione oversaw the restoration of the home of Antonio Meucci and Giuseppe Garibaldi on Staten Island, which was later opened as the Garibaldi-Meucci Museum, to honor the memory of the two great Italians who had once lived there.

=== Returning to Italy – Journalism and the "hotline" with the States ===
In the summer of 1957 Uguccione returned to Italy, where he continued to work for the Ministry of Foreign Affairs. He temporarily suspended publication of The Italian Scene, which resumed in July 1958 and continued uninterrupted until his death. At the same time, again in 1958, he began writing as an editorialist for important national and local newspapers, such as Il Corriere della Sera, La Nazione and the Giornale di Brescia, sometimes using the press to engage in campaigns such as his successful efforts in the United States for naming after Giovanni da Verrazzano the new bridge being built in New York between Brooklyn and Staten Island; it was christened as the Verrazzano–Narrows Bridge on November 21, 1964. His journalistic battles in Italy were less fortunate, both in the campaign to have the A1 motorway (Autostrada del Sole) pass through Umbria and in the more local battle undertaken to prevent the skyline of Perugia from being marred by a group of new RAI antennas with the construction of the structure known as the “Palazzo degli Orecchioni” (“Big Ears Building”) on the hill of Monteripido.^{,}

Starting in 1961, Uguccione would be sent to North America periodically by the Ministry of Foreign Affairs to hold conferences on the occasion of the first centennial of the Unification of Italy. A first series of presentations on themes from the Italian Risorgimento to the development of Italy in a century of united history took place from April to May 1961, touching eastern Canada, the Midwest, Texas and the Atlantic coast states. The second series was held in the autumn of 1961 in California, some Atlantic states, and New York City.

Four years later, as part of the festivities planned for the 700th anniversary of Dante’s birth, Uguccione set off on a new tour in the United States, speaking at several universities (St. Mary’s College, Stanford University, University of California, University of San Francisco). He once again distinguished himself for his encyclopedic preparation, his fine sense of humor and his proud passion for Italian culture. His great success and the fame that accompanied him earned him the honorary citizenship of the city of San Francisco, receiving the keys to the city on October 30, 1965 from Mayor John Francis Shelley. In 1968, during one of his last U.S. public engagements, he collaborated in the organization of the Italian pavilion for the HemisFair Universal Exposition in San Antonio, Texas.

=== Final years and historical-literary writings ===
Starting in the 1960s, motivated mainly by the reorganization of the rich family archival heritage, Uguccione developed a renewed interest in local history, dedicating himself both to the events of the Ranieri Bourbon di Sorbello family and to his beloved Perugia. This interest resulted in two very successful historical-literary works: the best seller La bella in mano al boia (1st ed. Rizzoli, 1965), a historical novel inspired by the chronicle of the story that shocked the town of Perugia in the year 1600 and led to the execution of the aristocrat Porzia Corradi, sentenced for adultery and put to death together with her lover, Roberto Valeriani, and a band of Perugian friends; and the powerful historical essay Perugia della Bell'Epoca, a work published posthumously in December 1969 that reconstructs the historical period starting from the city riots of June 20, 1859 (the Perugia Uprising), which occurred during the second War of Independence, up to May 24, 1915, the date of Italy’s entry into World War I.

Uguccione Ranieri di Sorbello died of a heart attack on May 28, 1969 in Rome, at the age of sixty-three.

== Personality ==
Uguccione Ranieri di Sorbello was an Italian intellectual and humanist. He was involved in cultural and intellectual activities and engaged with the artistic and historical heritage of his time. His life and work are recorded in contemporary accounts.

The jurist Ugo Castelnuovo-Tedesco (1890-1974) left a portrait of him in verse: «In speaking of things and people / Zeno first named Uguccione. / But meeting him one day, I was perplexed / at hearing him shout like a madman. / Our acquaintance, therefore / did not begin brilliantly, as I remember. / However, making fraternal amends / here it is right to render him justice. / Wanting to formulate my concepts / I say Uguccione is without flaws: / they are all excesses, excesses of passions, / the warm, lively ingenuousness of the good. / Educated in the Montessori system / he has always been honest within and without / and in life has never taken a step / if not freely and in good faith.»

The most efficacious profile, however, remains that left by Indro Montanelli, a long-time friend of Uguccione who knew well his strengths and weaknesses. In a lengthy article published in Il Corriere della Sera on May 28, 1970, almost a year after his friend’s death, Montanelli remembers him as "the most naive, scatterbrained, mud-splattered man in the world, but also one of the most generous, unpredictable, warm, candid, fascinating and poetic. His conscience was the exact opposite of his ties and jackets: spotless."

== Personal life ==
On October 21, 1951 Uguccione was wedded to Maria Maddalena de Vecchi (known as Marilena), a refined, cultured woman from a prestigious Tuscan family. Her mother, Vittoria de’ Pazzi, was a descendant of the noble Pazzi family of Florence, and her father, count Bindo de Vecchi, was an esteemed anatomopathologist and the Rector of the University of Florence. The couple’s only child, Ruggero Ranieri di Sorbello, was born on August 21, 1952.

In 1995, in honor of the memory of Uguccione Ranieri, his wife Marilena de Vecchi Ranieri and son Ruggero established the Fondazione Ranieri di Sorbello.

== Published works and writings ==
=== Journalism ===
- Articles in English and Italian written during his time in America (1930-1936), appearing in East Coast newspapers and magazines, such as Il Progresso Italo-Americano; Yale Daily News; Corriere del Connecticut; Il Giornalino della Casa Italiana; Corriere d'America; New Orleans Item; Italian Post; Rome Daily American; Italy America Monthly and Italy America Review (he was also editor-in-chief of the last two of these).
- The Italian Scene: monthly bulletin published in New York from April 1953 to May 1957 under the title The Italian Scene: A Bulletin of Cultural Information. Its publication then continued in Rome from November 1958 to June 1969, on behalf of the Foreign Journalists’ Center of the Ministry of Foreign Affairs, with the title The Italian Scene: A Bulletin of Varied Information.
- From 1950 to 1953 he was a contributor to the magazines Notizie federaliste mondiali and Federalismo nel mondo.
- Starting from 1958, he published approximately 250 articles in local and national newspapers (e.g. Il Corriere della Sera; La Nazione; Il Giornale di Brescia).

=== Literary works and essays ===
- Con le signore c'è più gusto, New York, Italian Publishers, 1936
- Uguccione Ranieri and Donato Martucci, Non votò la famiglia De Paolis. Lettere scritte domani, racconto, Milan, Longanesi & Co., 1948
- Donato Martucci and Uguccione Ranieri, Lo strano settembre 1950, Milan, Longanesi & Co., 1950
- “Come in una ballata del Trecento”. Tuttitalia. Enciclopedia dell'Italia antica e moderna: Umbria, Florence, Sadea Sansoni – Novara, Istituto geografico De Agostini, 1961-1964, pp. 115–117
- “Erte aeree prospettive”. Tuttitalia. Enciclopedia dell'Italia antica e moderna: Umbria, Florence, Sadea Sansoni – Novara, Istituto geografico De Agostini, 1961-1964, pp. 283–285
- “Il pianto della ninfa”. Tuttitalia. Enciclopedia dell'Italia antica e moderna: Umbria, Florence, Sadea Sansoni – Novara, Istituto geografico De Agostini, 1961-1964, pp. 356–360
- Donato Martucci and Uguccione Ranieri, The Strange September of 1950, New York, Horizon Press, 1962
- La bella in mano al boia. Una storia inedita di Perugia nel Seicento, Milan, Rizzoli, 1965
- Sorbello e i suoi marchesi reggenti. Breve storia del feudo tra l'Umbria e la Toscana nei secoli XIV-XIX, Perugia, Volumnia, 1969
- Perugia della Bell'Epoca: 1859-1915, Perugia, Volumnia, 1969
- Preface to [Marco Vincenzo] Coronelli, Umbria, 1708, [s.l., s.n.], 1969 (Perugia, Tip. G. Benucci. Anastatic edition of 1000 numbered copies.

== Military honors ==
Silver Medal of Military Valor (Italian Army)

“Officer inspired by a very high sense of duty, following the armistice he boldly passed the lines of the front, offering his services to the Italian military authorities in liberated territory. A volunteer for a risky war mission, he was landed behind German lines, where he created, with intelligent initiative and cool contempt for danger, an efficient organization for the recovery of Allied prisoners, succeeding in saving many of them. He later joined a formation of patriots with whom he took part in numerous daring actions until the arrival of the liberating troops. – Zone of Operations, October 1943-July 1944.”

— 1945

Bronze Medal of Military Valor (Italian Army)

“Surprised by the events of September 8, 1943 in German-occupied territory, and determined to place himself at the service of his country, together with four other courageous men he managed to take possession of an enemy patrol boat, heading out from San Benedetto del Tronto at night and reaching the liberated territory of Manfredonia the following dawn. The crossing lasted 12 hours, putting their trust in fate because they had no seafaring experience, and were equipped with only a simple makeshift compass and a limited amount of fuel. The boat stolen from the Germans was then delivered to the Italian navy. – Adriatic Sea, September 8–9, 1943”

— 1949

== See also ==
- Bourbon di Sorbello
