= Romeyne Robert Ranieri di Sorbello =

Aristocrat and businesswoman

Romeyne Robert Ranieri di Sorbello, also known as Romeyne Robert (New York, 16 October 1877 – Perugia, 22 January 1951), was an aristocrat and businesswoman, originally from the United States. She was a member of the Ranieri Bourbon di Sorbello family.

== Family and education background ==
Romeyne Robert belonged to a wealthy family of the United States upper bourgeoisie with ancient French Huguenot roots, originally from La Rochelle (Charente Maritime, France), which settled in America around the end of the 17th century: the first member of this family who travelled to Italy was Judge Daniel Robert, in 1686. In the nineteenth century the family began to accumulate a substantial fortune, as a result of well-managed business activities; more specifically Christopher Rhinelander Robert (1802–1878), Romeyne's grandfather, was a prosperous businessman, who ̶ in 1835 – founded the company Robert & Williams, for the import of sugar, tea and coffee. A religious man and dedicated philanthropist, in 1863 he established the Robert College in Istanbul, an institution to which he left a substantial legacy and which became an important advanced training centre in the Near East, as well as a monument to American philanthropy.

Howell Robert (1844–1914), Christopher's son, married Charlotte Shaw (1841–1940), a second cousin of the writer, playwright, linguist and musical critic George Bernard Shaw. They had three daughters, but only Romeyne lived to become an adult.

Romeyne grew between Germantown, near Philadelphia and Morristown in New Jersey. A cultured young woman, great enthusiast of music and theatre and fluent in four languages, she travelled extensively across Europe with her parents, and continued her education there. In 1901 during a trip to Italy with her mother Charlotte, in Rome, she met her future husband: marquis Ruggero Ranieri di Sorbello (1864–1946), whom she married in 1902. She then moved permanently to Perugia, at Palazzo Sorbello, an aristocratic residence in town, historically property of her husband's family.

== The "Scuola di ricami Ranieri di Sorbello" ==
Romeyne became active in the area of philanthropy and social promotion, following the model inaugurated by the "settlement movement", established in England around the end of the 20th century, which later developed also in major cities along the north-east coast of the United States. The indigent communities living in what were known as settlement houses, funded by men and women from this movement, benefited from educational and welfare projects; this also included the development – particularly among immigrant women – of artistic and professional training, often with an ideal link to the Arts and Crafts movement, which had also reached England from the United States and whose purpose was the promotion of arts and the industry, creating products of high artistic value, highlighting the artisan experience by reproducing motifs and drawings related to the past, more specifically to the Renaissance period. These artefacts were actually the subject not only of great artistic interest, but also involved a flourishing market of collectors and enthusiasts.

Following this model, Romeyne then decided to set up at Villa del Pischiello, on the estate of the Ranieri di Sorbello family, in the hilly area around Lake Trasimeno, a school of embroidery, which later became known as "Scuola di ricami Ranieri di Sorbello".

For this project of hers, she availed herself of support from Carolina Amari (Florence, 9 September 1866 – Rome, 11 August 1942), one of the figures within the women's emancipation movement which started in Italy at the end of the nineteenth century, based on the model of what was happening at the time in the Anglo-Saxon world. Carolina Amari also provided the necessary artistic and technical guidance to establish the cooperative called "Industrie Femminili Italiane" (1903), with the aim of supporting or developing workshops and embroidery and lace-making activities throughout Italy; this led to the rediscovery of an artistic technique by then in decline. Being also well known in the United States for her artistic interpretation on fabric of medieval and Renaissance patterns, in 1905 she contributed to setting up in New York the "Scuola d'Industrie Italiane", whose purpose was to help immigrant women find employment by producing and selling embroidered and lace items.

The partnership between Romeyne and Carolina Amari encompassed both the artistic and the business side, with a view to implementing many of the methods promoted by the company I.F.I., resulting in a successful business, from both an entrepreneurial and a social perspective, as source of employment, income and emancipation for young female farm labourers in the areas around Lake Trasimeno, who worked there as embroiderers. The school workshop was inaugurated in 1904 with eight embroiderers; ten years later it employed eighty women, and between 1928 and 1933 at least one hundred and fifty.

=== Work procedures in the "Scuola di ricami Ranieri di Sorbello" ===
All the women who lived in the areas around the villa and who had an interest in contributing to supporting the family, or who wished to set aside resources, thus becoming independent from male figures, could enrol in this "vocational school", where they could learn a trade. Each of the female workers was assigned a specific task, which had to be completed independently, without divulging information about the possible techniques learnt and employed there. All this led to training a specialised female workforce, as well as allowing for a unique end product. The work was done from home, passing through the hands of several women, each of them performing their specific task, the same as on an actual "assembly line". Once the finished item was delivered, the job completed was recorded in a pocket-sized log-book, which was indeed one of the first examples of "worker’s personal card", one of which was given to each female staff member. On a set day of the month, in the presence of the Marchioness and of an accountant, the women went to the villa and were paid for the work they had done; it was then Romeyne herself who encouraged them to open an account with the Cassa di Risparmio di Perugia where they could pay in their earnings.

The female staff had the chance to learn, or perfect, several more or less popular embroidery stitches; following a social welfare concept, though, they were not only engaged in their work: many of them also learned to read and write, as well as acquiring basic personal hygiene and cleaning skills, which were also required on the job.

Romeyne, as well as being head of the school, often prepared patterns for embroidering: she had studied art and drawing, therefore she was skilled at reproducing on sketchbooks the ornaments and friezes she saw on architectural structures, artefacts or painted images. She was also inspired by the ancient embroideries she saw in the collection owned by Countess Edith Rucellai in Florence, which she used to create a pattern based on a medieval-Renaissance taste concept, with distinctive curls, floral panoplies, animal and anthropomorphic figures. Starting from her preparatory sketches, it was then the task of Carolina Amari to produce more stylised drawings, then copied out on paper patterns for the embroiderers who finally reproduced the subject using several types of stitch.

The point of pride, as well as original creation at the "Scuola di ricami Ranieri di Sorbello" was the so-called "Punto Sorbello" or "Umbro Antico": officially patented by the Marchioness, it was actually the result of restyling by Carolina Amari of traditional stitches and embroideries of Arab origin, widespread both in Italy and in Portugal. It was usually stitched on rough cloth, and consisted of various types of overlapping needlepoint (using stitches known as curly, witch, grass, entwined, full, scallop, etc.), which resulted in an ideal relief effect. Starting in 1908, the products were made almost exclusively on valuable linen fabric woven in the "Tela Umbra" workshop, founded in Città di Castello in 1908 by Baroness Alice Hallgarten Franchetti, a friend of Romeyne's with whom she started a profitable business arrangement.

As entrepreneur and promoter of her own business, Romeyne started to take part in numerous trade fairs and exhibitions, for example the international "Industries and Labour " show in 1911 in Turin, proving highly successful. The demand for embroideries from her school increased considerably in Italy, but most notably in Europe and in America: foreign markets were indeed the source of most of its revenues.

Based on this experience, the Marchioness decided to encourage the establishment of other similar vocational schools, which, with more or less difficulty, were being opened in the region. This is how, in 1921, a partnership was created with other women from the Perugia aristocracy, resulting in the Cooperative called “Arti Decorative Italiane", to which the "Scuola di ricami Ranieri di Sorbello" became affiliated and which was active until 1929. The end of this syndicated organisation was mainly due to the economic collapse caused by the Great Depression in the United States, which led to a considerable reduction in orders, bringing down the requests for some textile articles to almost zero because of the exorbitant customs duties being imposed.

The school remained open until 1934. For several years Carolina Amari, by then advanced in age, had no longer been its artistic director, the position having been assigned to Amelia Pompili. Having officially ceased all her activities, Marchioness Romeyne decided to gather in her Perugia residence at Palazzo Sorbello all of the unsold artefacts, creating a collection with a large number of items produced both in the embroidery workshop she had inaugurated, and in other affiliated schools from the area. The idea behind this was presumably preventing someone from continuing to produce embroideries in the style known as "Sorbello stitch", whose quality might not be up to the standards which she had set, thus inevitably devaluing a result which had taken more than 30 years to achieve.

Today some examples of the embroideries made by the "Scuola di ricami Ranieri di Sorbello" are kept in 4 museums: Casa Museo di Palazzo Sorbello (Perugia, Italy), Museum of the "Tela Umbra" (Città di Castello, Italy), Museum of the embroidery of Bologna (Bologna, Italy), Cooper Hewitt Museum (New York City).

== Her teaching effort: the Pischiello rural school ==
The commitment on the part of Marchioness Romeyne Robert in the area of philanthropy was not limited to the embroidery school, it also took the concrete form of a teaching project aimed at improving the living conditions of children from the rural areas of Pischiello; this project began with the opening of the first primary school at Pischiello, founded by Romeyne in 1903 using several rooms in one wing of the Villa del Pischiello.

This school was officially opened on 19 December 1903; it consisted of three co-ed forms, with one class for each grade, and had twenty-seven pupils in the school year 1903–1904, whose age ranged between nine and twelve Starting in 1907 the school also took on children resident in the municipality of Passignano sul Trasimeno, with the latter renting some classrooms through an annual concession free of charge granted by Romeyne's husband, Ruggero Ranieri di Sorbello. From that moment onwards the teachers, who initially had no specific teaching qualifications, began to be recruited by means of a public competition organized by the Municipality of Passignano.

Having realised the backwardness of living conditions of farmers in the area, as well as the insufficient educational offer by the Pischiello facility for dealing with this situation, Romeyne decided to experiment with the Montessori method, following the virtuous example of her friend Baroness Alice Hallgarten Franchetti (1874–1911), also of American origin and wife of the Baron and senator of the Kingdom of Italy Leopoldo Franchetti. The Montessori method played an essential role in the development of the Pischiello school towards a more structured set-up.

=== The friendship with Alice Hallgarten Franchetti and the meeting with Maria Montessori ===
Romeyne Robert and Alice Franchetti attended the same intellectual and feminist circles in Rome, as well as sharing the same ideals of social renewal. They had a very close friendship, not just as regards the artisan workshops they managed ("Tela Umbra" for Alice, "Scuola di ricami Ranieri di Sorbello" for Romeyne), but also because of their profitable cooperation in fostering the primary schools which they had both started in their respective country residences.

Already in 1901 Alice Hallgarten Franchetti had decided to set up a school using some of the rooms on the second floor at Villa della Montesca, the Franchetti country residence near Città di Castello. Shortly after that, a second rural school was opened in the small village of Rovigliano. The relevant syllabus projects were compiled by Baroness Franchetti herself, then perfected with the help of important personalities in the area of modern pedagogy, including the British teacher Lucy Latter. In 1907, Baron and Baroness Franchetti contributed to opening the first "Casa dei Bimbi" in Rome and, after having personally met the pedagogy expert from the Marche region Maria Montessori in the home of the writer Sibilla Aleramo, decided to support her concretely by inviting her to stay at Villa Montesca for the summer of 1909. It was during her stay in Città di Castello that Maria Montessori put down in writing what would become the first edition of her celebrated Metodo, dedicating her work to Baron and Baroness Franchetti. During the same period she also held the first teachers’ training course with focus on the Montessori method at Palazzo Alberti-Tomassini, headquarters of the Tela Umbra workshop in Città di Castello. After this course, Baroness Franchetti inaugurated a "Casa dei Bambini" at Villa Montesca.

Thanks to mediation by Alice, Romeyne Robert had a chance to meet both Maria Montessori and the teacher Felicitas Buchner at Villa Wolkonsky in Rome in 1909. The Montessori method, initially "tested" on request of the Marchioness directly on her three children (Gian Antonio, Uguccione and Lodovico), was then applied to teaching in the rural primary school at Pischiello just three months after the meeting with the illustrious pedagogy expert: in June 1909 the Pischiello school appeared to be fully equipped and operational following Maria Montessori's theories. In December that same year, an official request arrived for items and photographic documentation for the Universal Exhibition in Brussels in 1910 from the Municipality of Passignano: there was very little time to deliver these materials, therefore the Italian Ministry for Public Education decided not to take part, expressing the intention of using the teaching documentation as part of a national exhibition scheduled for 1911 to celebrate fifty years after Italian unification.

Starting in the 1920s the Pischiello school started a transformation process from rural school to subsidiary school, according to the classification of experimental schools opened in 1912 by Conte Eugenio Faina, initially in his estates for the training of farmers, and then in various Italian regions, under the coordination of the Ente Nazionale per la Scuola Rurale. Opening of the subsidiary school at Pischiello was authorised in 1927, but lessons there started only in the school year 1930–31. The shift towards this new educational trend, however, did not coincide with a change in the intentions of the Marchioness, who persevered in her wish to support disadvantaged children by paying personally the enrolment fee in the Opera Nazionale Balilla for the whole school in 1933; this meant that even the children whose family was worst off, could have access to free material assistance and school meals.

The rural school at Pischiello officially closed in 1967 because there were too few pupils enrolled.

== World War Two and her final years ==
During the difficult years after Italy entered the Second World War, Romeyne and her husband Ruggero, who was by then nearly eighty years old and in poor health, went to stay at Castello di Sorbello, a family residence in Sant’Andrea di Sorbello, in the Municipality of Cortona. Romeyne's three children, after the armistice was signed by General Badoglio in 1943, used their forces in the service of allied troops; they were thus accused of anti-fascist activities and collaboration with the enemy: Uguccione joined the intelligence service of the Allies, known as IS9 (or also as A-Force), in an effort to save disbanded Allied forces beyond enemy lines; he was followed in this venture by his brother Lodovico. Giovanni Antonio, the eldest of the three brothers, after Italy's Liberation was appointed Vice-prefetto by the Allied Military Government, with the specific assignment of rebuilding roads and bridges in the province, a position which he held from July 1944 to January 1945.

From January to May 1944, Castello di Sorbello was occupied by the German army, then liberated by British Allied troops. Despite the German occupation, Romeyne managed to hide in some rooms of the buildings of the large mansion several British officers for about ten days, thereby making sure that their presence did not become known in the valley. Being a very assertive woman, she succeeded in ensuring the release of her husband, following the arrest by Fascist supporters of the Republic of Salò acting upon an order by the Head of the Province, Armando Rocchi, who tried in vain to make him confess where his three sons were hiding.

At the end of the war, Romeyne travelled to the United States for a holiday, the first time she had done so since her marriage: even though she had always been an enthusiastic traveller, the routes she followed had mostly been within the borders of Italy and the rest of the European continent, either for pleasure or to promote products made at the "Scuola di ricami Ranieri di Sorbello".

Romeyne Robert Ranieri di Sorbello died on 22 January 1951. She was laid to rest in the monumental cemetery of Perugia. On 27 January 1951, an article published in the newspaper Il Mattino del Centro Italia, praised her business success and commitment to a social and teaching mission.
