= Bartolus de Saxoferrato =

Italian law professor

- Bartolo de Sassoferrato
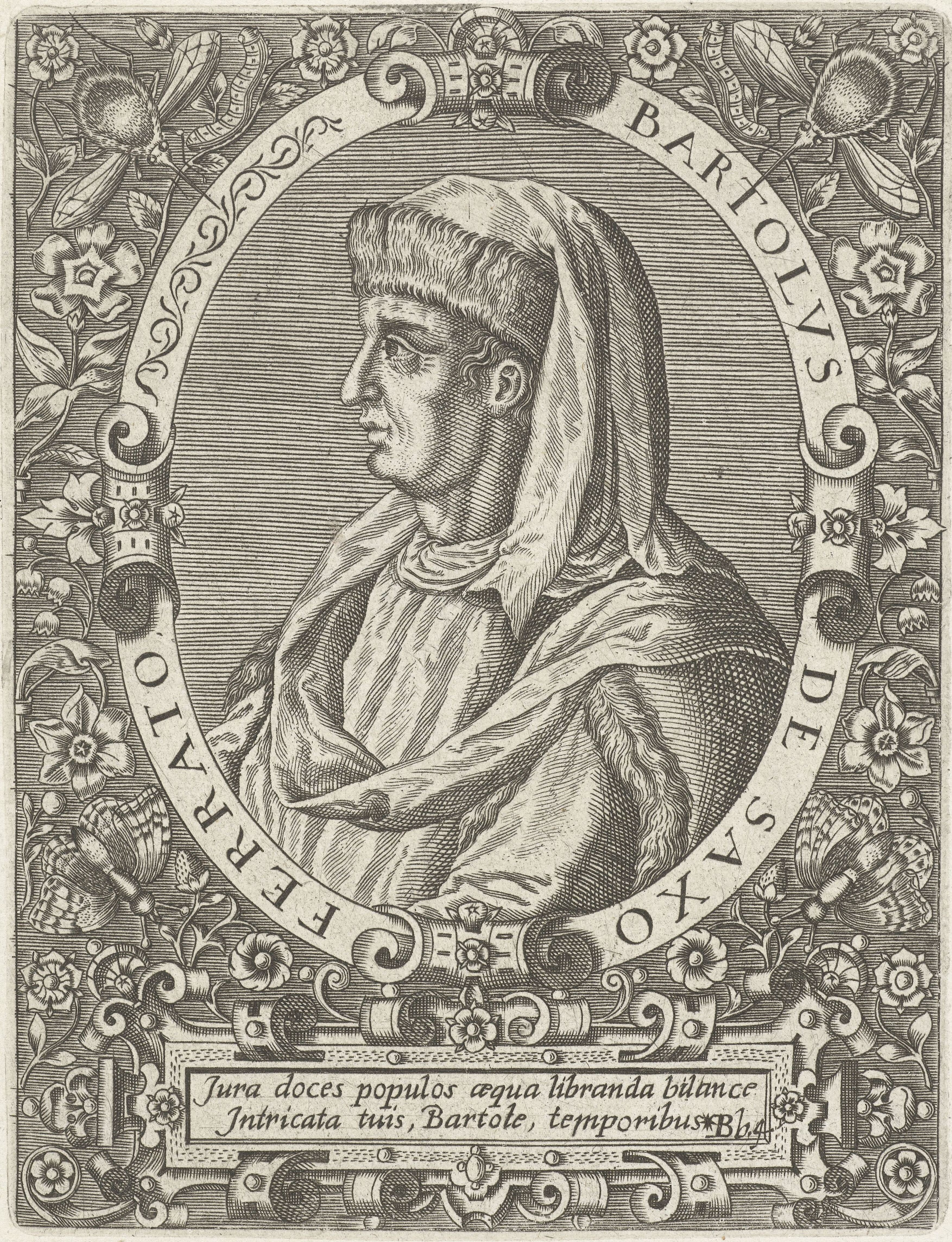
- Born: 1313; Venatura, Marche, Italy
- Died: 13 July 1357 (aged 43–44); Perugia, Italy
- Education: University of Perugia University of Bologna
- Occupation: Law professor

Bartolus de Saxoferrato (Italian: Bartolo da Sassoferrato; 1313 – 13 July 1357) was an Italian law professor and one of the most prominent continental jurists of Medieval Roman Law. He belonged to the school known as the commentators or postglossators. The admiration of later generations of civil lawyers is shown by the adage nemo bonus íurista nisi bartolista—"no one is a good lawyer unless he is a Bartolist" (i.e. a follower of Bartolus).

== Life and works ==
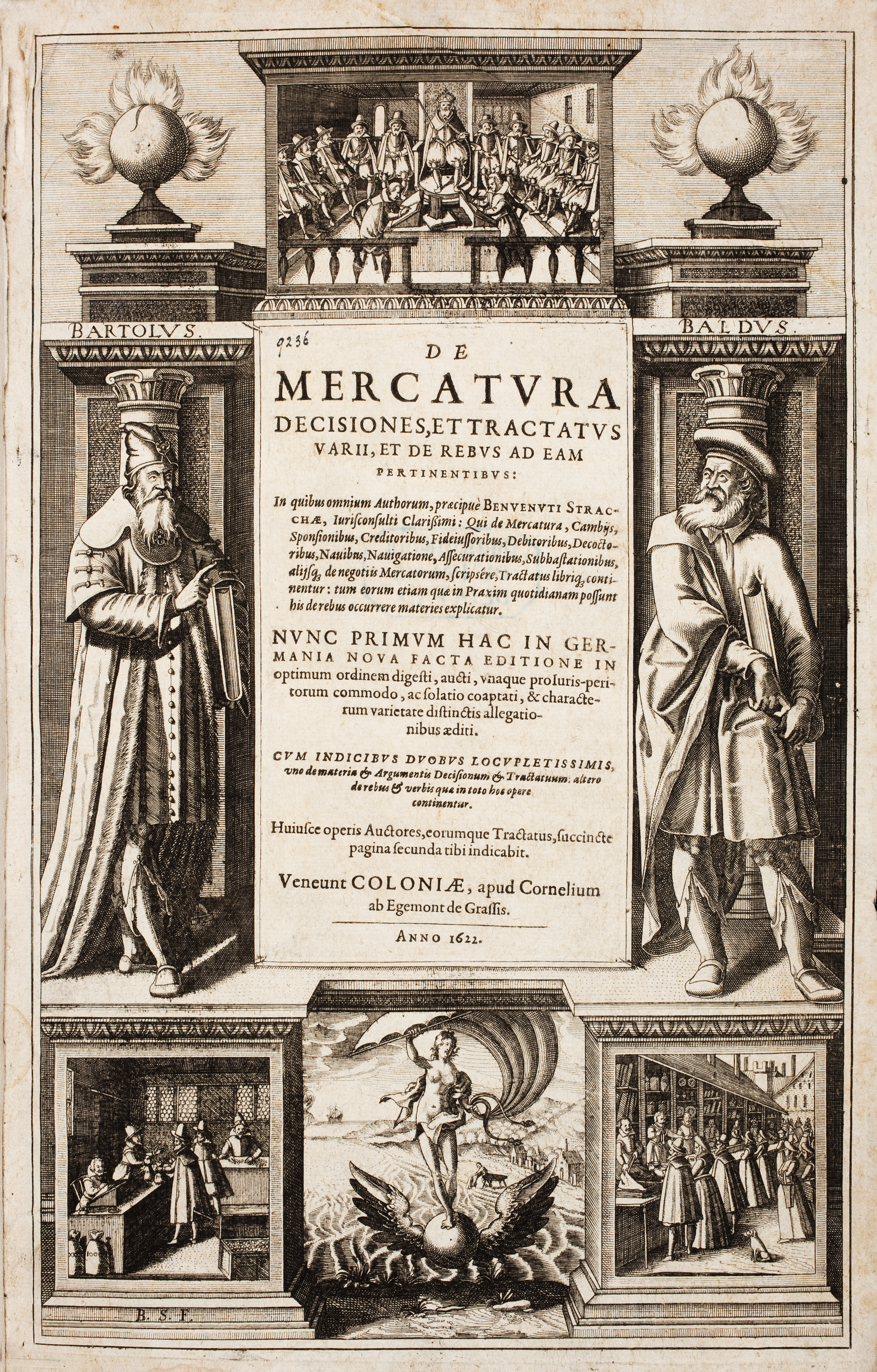
Bartolus de Saxoferrato at the left on the title page of Benvenutus Straccha (Benvenuto Stracca): De mercatura decisiones, 1671

Bartolus was born in the village of Venatura, near Sassoferrato, in the Italian region of Marche. His father was Franciscus Severi, a lawyer. His mother was of the Alfani family. He read civil law at the University of Perugia under Cinus, and in the University of Bologna under Oldradus and Belviso, and graduated to doctor of law in 1334. In 1339, he started teaching first in Pisa, then in Perugia. He raised the character of Perugia's law school to a level with that of Bologna, and this city made him an honorary citizen in 1348. In 1355, Emperor Charles IV appointed him as his consiliarius. In Perugia, Baldus de Ubaldis and his brothers Angelus and Petrus became pupils of Bartolus. Bartolus died in Perugia at the age of 43, and was interred in the church of San Francisco with a monument inscribed with "Ossa Bartoli".

Despite his short life, Bartolus left an extraordinary number of works. He wrote commentaries on all parts of the Corpus Juris Civilis. He is also the author of a large number of treatises on specific subjects. Among these treatises is his famous book on the law relating to rivers (De fluminibus seu Tyberiadis). There are also almost 400 legal opinions (consilia) written at the request of judges or private parties seeking legal advice.

Bartolus developed many novel legal concepts, which became part of the civil law tradition. Among his most important contributions were those to the area of conflict of laws—a field of great importance in 14th century Italy, where every city-state had its own statutes and customs. Bartolus also dealt with a variety of constitutional law issues. In his treatise De insigniis et armis he discussed not only the law of Arms but also some problems of trademark law.

Bartolus also wrote on political issues, including the legitimacy of city governments, partisan divisions and the regimes of Italy's petty tyrants. His political thought balanced respect for the Empire with defense of the legitimacy of local Italian governments.

Bartolus is believed to be the first theorist of international law. He and his disciple Baldus of Ubaldis defined a set of norms which enforced the reciprocal independency and autonomy of the city-states of northern Italy, but into the cornerstone of a common discipline established by the Empire. While the city-states were internally self-governing, their mutual relationships were governed by the Holy Roman Emperor.

== Legacy ==
Already famous in his lifetime, Bartolus was later regarded as the greatest jurist after the renaissance of Roman law. This is evident not only from the above-quoted saying, but also from the fact that statutes in Spain 1427/1433 and Portugal 1446 provided that his opinions should be followed where the Roman source texts and the Accursian gloss were silent. Lorenzo Valla was driven out of the University of Pavia in 1431 for his critique of Bartolus' Latin style. Even in England, where the civil law he had worked on was not applicable, Bartolus was held in high esteem. He influenced civilian writers such as Alberico Gentili and Richard Zouch.

Due to Bartolus' fame, his name was used for the character of a lawyer in many Italian plays and other works, for example Dr. Bartolo in Pierre Beaumarchais' The Barber of Seville, and hence Gioachino Rossini's opera The Barber of Seville and Mozart's The Marriage of Figaro.

== Works ==
- Consilia, quaestiones et tractatus (in Latin). Lyon: Thomas Berthelier. 1547.
- De fluminibus seu Tyberiadis (in Latin).
  - La Tiberiade di Bartole da Sasferrato del modo di diuidere l'alluuioni, l'isole, & gl'aluei (in Italian). Rome: eredi Giovanni Gigliotti. 1587.
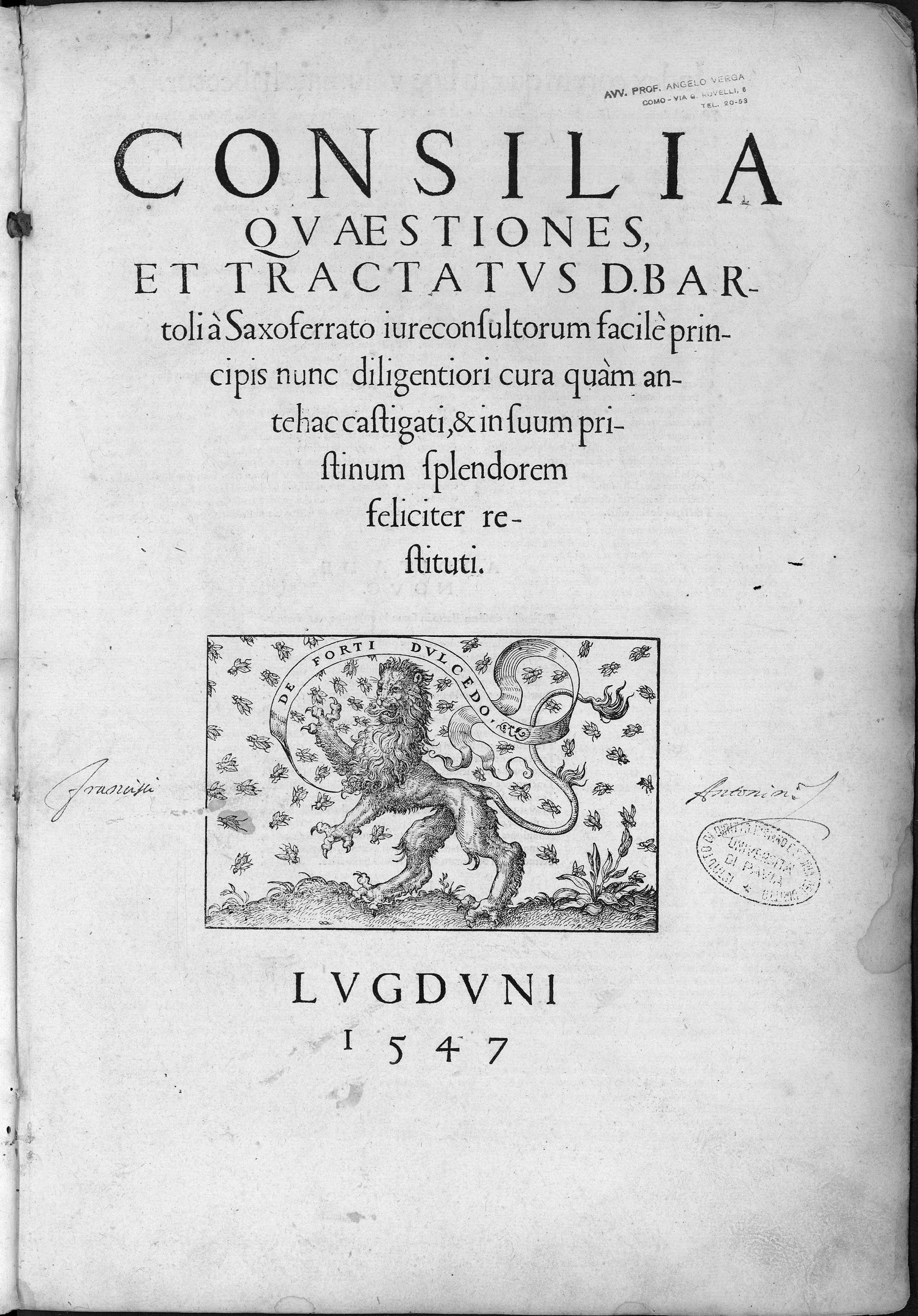
Consilia, quaestiones et tractatus, 1547

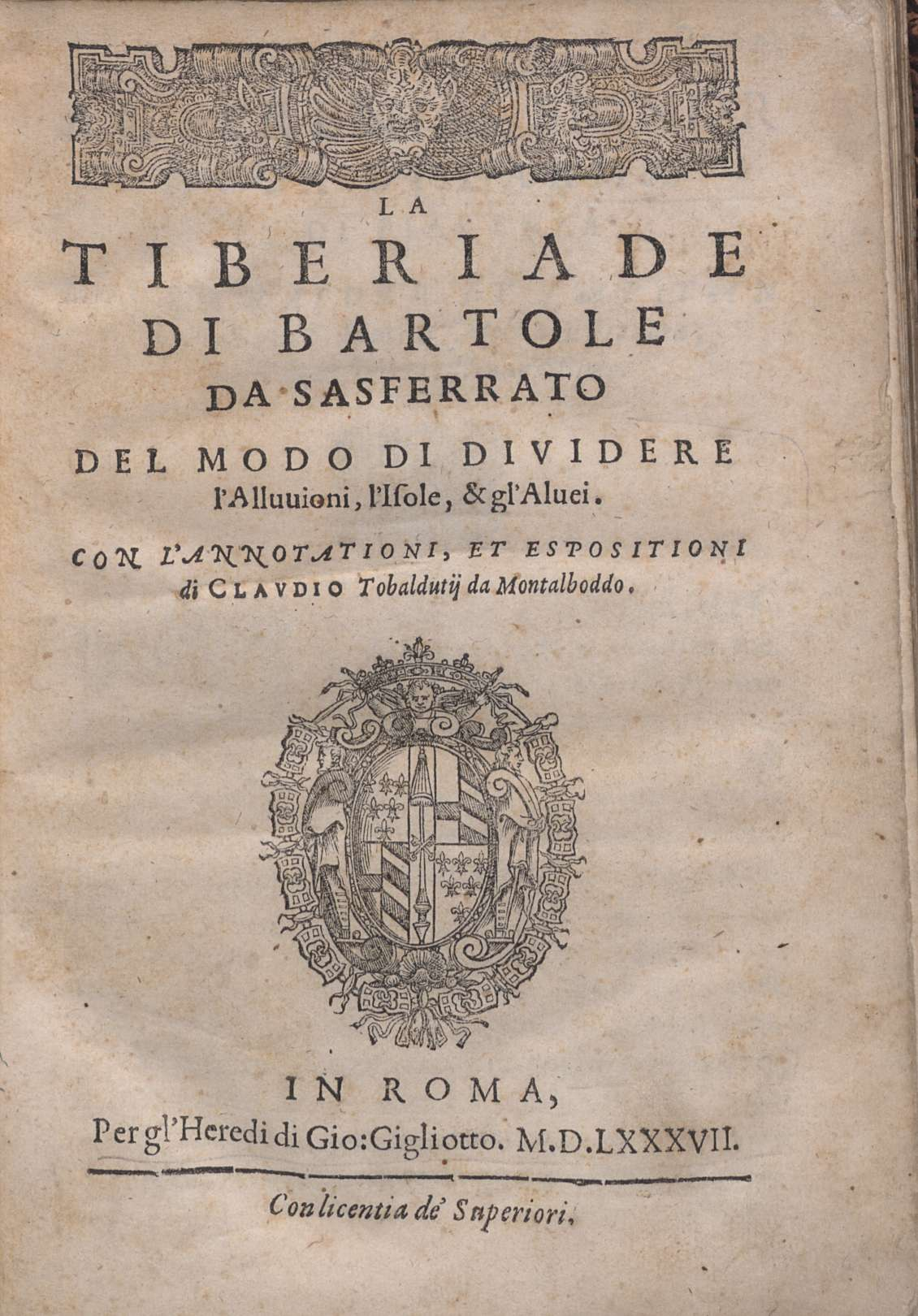
1587 edition in Italian of De fluminibus

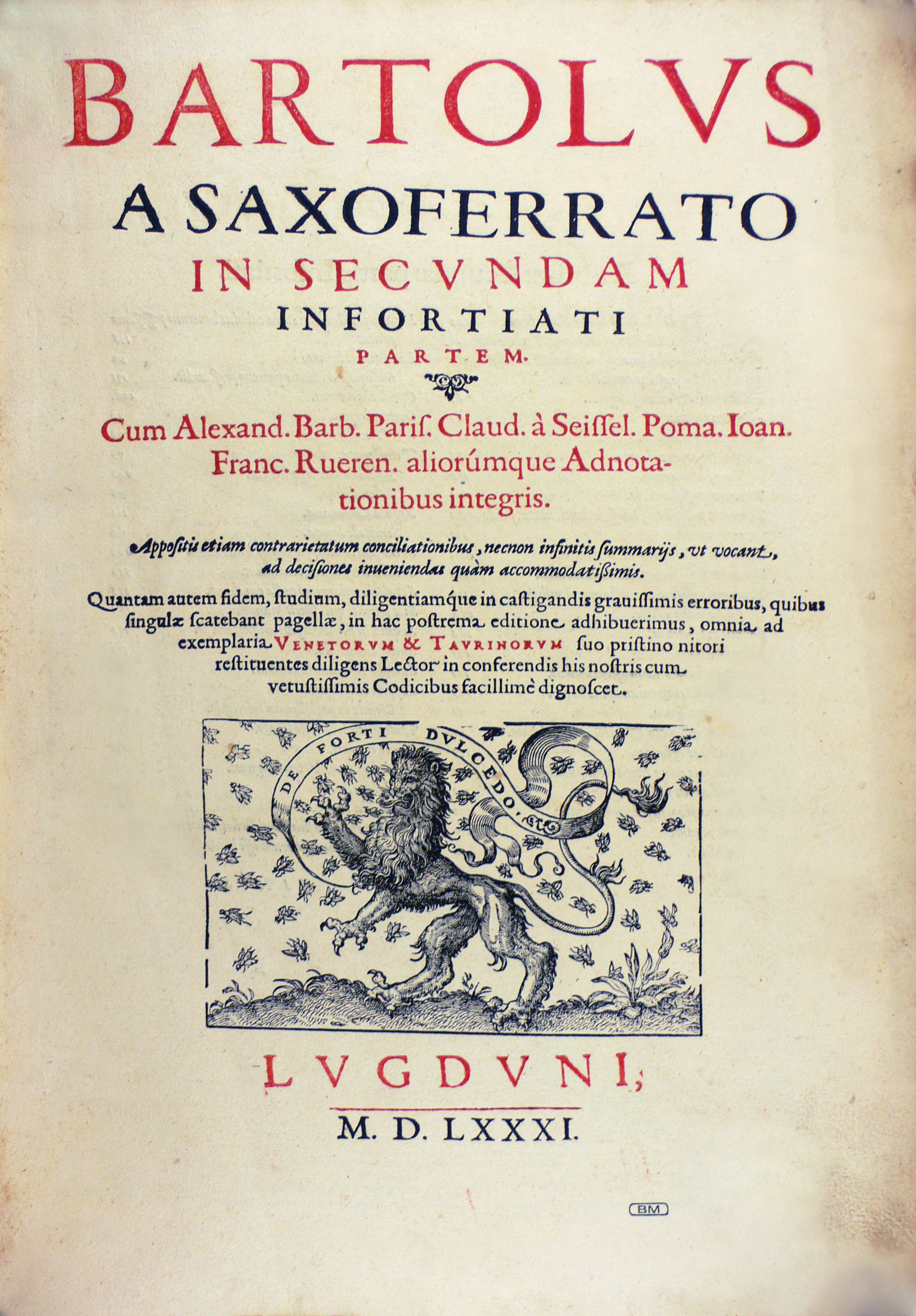
Opera omnia, 1581 (Milano, Fondazione Mansutti)

=== Catalogs of manuscripts ===
- Casamassima, Emanuele, Codices operum Bartoli a Saxoferrato recensiti 1, Iter Germanicum (Firenze: Olschki, 1971).
- Dolezalek, Gero, Verzeichnis der Handschriften zum römischen Recht bis 1600, 4 vols. (Frankfurt: Max-Planck-Institut für europäische Rechtsgeschichte, 1972).
- García y García, Antonio, Codices operum Bartoli a Saxoferrato recensiti 2, Iter Hispanicum (Firenze: Olschki, 1973).
- Izbicki, Thomas M., and Patrick Lally, "Texts Attributed to Bartolus de Saxoferrato in North American Manuscript Collections," Manuscripta 35 (1991): 146–155.
- Izbicki, Thomas M., "Additional Texts Attributed to Bartolus de Saxoferrato in North American Manuscript Collections," Manuscripta 55 (2011): 146–155.
- Izbicki, Thomas M., "Manuscript Works of Bartolus de Saxoferrato in the Vatican Library," Rivista Internazionale di Diritto Comune 23 (2012): 147-210.
- Krafzik, Sebastian: Die Herrschereinsetzung aus der Sicht des Bartolus von Sassoferato In: Journal on European History of Law, London: STS Science Centre, Vol. 1, No. 2, pp. 39–43, (ISSN 2042-6402).
- Kuttner, Stephan, and Reinhard Elze, A Catalogue of Canon and Roman Law Manuscripts in the Vatican Library, 2 vols. (Città del Vaticano: Biblioteca Apostolica Vaticana, 1986–1987). Volume 1: Codices Vaticani latini 541-2299; volume 2: Codices Vaticani latini 2300-2746.

== General and cited references ==
=== Primary sources ===
- Quaglioni, Diego. Politica e diritto nel trecento italiano. Il "De tyranno" di Bartolo da Sassoferrato (1314–1357). Con l'edizione critica dei trattati "De Guelphis et Gebellinis", "De regimine civitatis", e "De tyranno", Olschki, Firenze, 1983.

=== Secondary sources ===
- Benedetto, Maria Ada (1958). Bartolo da Sassoferrato. In Novissimo Digesto Italiano. Vol 2. ISBN 88-02-01797-2. pp. 279–280.
- Cavallar, Osvaldo, et al., A grammar of signs: Bartolo da Sassoferrato's Tract on insignia and coats of arms (Berkeley, CA: Robbins Collection, University of California at Berkeley, 1994).
- Cavallar, Osvaldo, "River of Law," in A Renaissance of conflicts: visions and revisions of law and society in Italy and Spain, ed. John A Marino and Thomas Kuehn (Toronto, Ont.: Centre for Reformation and Renaissance Studies, 2004), pp. 31–129. (Includes editions of parts of the Tyberiadis and of a consilium.)
- Emerton, Ephraim, Humanism and Tyranny (Gloucester, Mass., P. Smith, 1964 [c1925]). Includes translations of Bartolus, "De tyrannia" and "De Guelphis et Gebellinis".
- Sheedy, Anna T. Bartolus on Social Conditions in the Fourteenth Century (New York: Columbia University Press, 1942).
- Ullmann, Walter (1962). Bartolus and English Jurisprudence. In Bartolo da Sassoferrato. Studi e Documenti per il VI centenario. Vol. 1. pp. 47–73.
- von Savigny, Friedrich Carl (1850). Geschichte des römischen Rechts im Mittelalter. Vol. 6. pp. 137–184.
- Woolf, C. N. S. Bartolus of Sassoferrato: His Position in the History of Medieval Political Thought (Cambridge, 1913).
