= Spring Valley Race Riot of 1895 =

Racial conflicts in Spring Valley, Illinois, US

- Part of the Nadir of American race relations
- Location: Spring Valley, Illinois
- Date: August 4-5, 1895
- Target: African Americans
- Perpetrator: White mobs

The Spring Valley race riot of 1895 was a violent racial conflict between Eastern and Southern European immigrants and African American coal workers in the mining town of Spring Valley, Illinois. The conflict was in response to the robbery and shooting of Italian miner Barney Rollo, who reported that his assailants were five black men. The assault provoked the town's long-standing social and racial unrest, and many white immigrant workers united against the African American miners. During the investigation into the shooting several black miners were temporarily taken into custody for questioning and many white townspeople began to form a mob, demanding that all blacks be fired and removed from Spring Valley. The mine manager refused, which prompted the white miners to violently riot against both the black miners and their families, forcing them to flee to the nearby town of Princeton.

== Background ==
=== African Americans and unrest in Illinois ===
In the late 1840s, Illinois banned slavery in its state constitution. During this time enslaved people who had escaped from the Southern United States settled in Illinois, forming freedmen communities. Census data reflects that 5,436 free African Americans lived in Illinois in 1850, mostly in counties near the Southern border like Madison, St. Clair, and Sangamon. Many white Illinoisans disliked the increasing free black population, which culminated in the 1853 promotion and passing of the Illinois Black Code, a bill that barred black people from migrating to or living in Illinois for over ten days, by Congress Democrat John A. Logan. Despite the law, the population of free African Americans grew by nearly 71% in a decade, and by 1860, there were 7,628 freedmen in Illinois. After the Civil War, the Fourteenth Amendment ultimately repealed the Black Code. Social relations between the two groups remained tense, as "most people of Illinois hated the very sight of a colored person."

Historian Felix Armfield has stated that the state's racial tension meant that it would "remain ripe for race wars," especially along the lines of labor in coal mining towns. As black workers were typically brought into mining communities as strikebreakers, white and immigrant workers could not reclaim their jobs easily, resulting in labor unrest and sometimes violent, fatal outbursts. St. Clair County was the site of one of the first instances of unrest in February 1874. Similarly, in April 1877, the coal town of Braidwood, Illinois, became the site of conflict along racial lines, along with Rapids City in January 1880 and Vermillion County in July 1886. These conflicts largely coincided with the end of Reconstruction and the beginning of the nadir of American race relations, which was largely defined by violence against African Americans.

=== Princeton and Spring Valley ===
The towns of Princeton and Spring Valley had a strained relationship. While Spring Valley was home to a large coal mining population, Princeton was more focused on agriculture. Princeton's residents were more middle class than those in Spring Valley. However, one of the most visible differences between these towns was the number of immigrants who lived there. Between 1890 and 1900, the population of Spring Valley had almost doubled, and 46% of their citizens were immigrants. This is compared to Princeton's population being just 2% of immigrants. At the same time, black residents of Bureau County, who composed less than one percent of the total population in the county, began to move to Spring Valley, further supporting this ethnic division between Spring Valley and Princeton. By 1900, 26 different ethnic groups were represented working in Spring Valley's coal mines, including Italian, French, Russian, Belgian, German, Lithuanian, and Polish. Due to the large number of miners in the town, it was also a union town. Spring Valley held four Local Assemblies of the Knights of Labor and organized the Miners and Mine Laborers Protective Association. Some immigrants were more forward, being members of militant or anarchist groups. This association of immigrants with radical political acts, along with other "unethical" acts such as the production and consumption of alcohol, incited an attitude of superiority or eliteness in Princeton's population. In many ways, Princeton residents saw the black citizens as living "the way they were supposed to." They knew their place in the world at the time and did little that would suggest they were trying to break out of that place. They rarely rocked the boat like the immigrants did, keeping to themselves and following the laws.

=== Unionization and its effects ===
The owners of the mines in Spring Valley attempted to prevent unionization by mine workers, and this resulted in tension between the owners and union agitators. The conflict between the two groups gave rise to a lockout on April 29, 1889, as the owners instructed the workers to stop working. Consequently, the United Mine Workers (UMW) union was founded in 1890, and when the lockout ended, the workers "refused to return to work on the mine owners' terms." Thus, African American and Italian workers were hired to replace the striking workers.

Despite the typical role of African American workers as strikebreakers, the UMW refused to prevent them from joining the union. The UMW instead added barriers to prevent Italian immigrants from joining the union, since union rules stated that officeholders had to speak English, and many Italian immigrants had recently emigrated and spoke very little English. The favoritism within the union began to play into the mounting conflict between African Americans and Italian workers in Spring Valley.

== Riot and response ==
On his way home from a local saloon on Saturday evening, August 3, Barney Rollo, an Italian miner, was "robbed by a group" of about five men, who were reported to be African-American. The men stole his monthly wages and his watch, and shot him, "leaving him on the road for dead."

The following Sunday morning, five African-American men accused of assaulting Barney Rollo were "arrested... 'without warrant,'" and held at City Hall for a "preliminary hearing." While the hearing was going on, a large white mob gathered outside City Hall, "determined to keep their town white." The men arrested pleaded not guilty to the charges against them, and were subsequently released. That same morning, local authorities searched African-American homes for firearms. Tensions continued to rise over the next few hours, with the mob marching to the home of S. M. Dalzell and the local mine manager demanding that the African American mine workers be fired in response to the reported attack. Dalzell refused. Shortly thereafter the mob began to raid the homes of African Americans in Spring Valley. The rioters used makeshift weapons during the riot, primarily mining tools such as picks but also reportedly some firearms. During the riot, many black people tried to flee, were chased, or hid in their homes. Many who tried to hide were dragged out by the rioters and violently attacked. Spring Valley Mayor Martin Delmagro requested police aid after being informed of the riot, but later canceled the request. County Sheriff Atherton Clark met with Delmagro and Dalzell to inquire about why the mayor canceled his call for police aid. Delmagro claimed that involvement in the riot was too much of a risk. After receiving no aid from local authorities, riot victims were "forced to take refuge in the homes of other black residents of the nearby community of Seatonville." Sheriff Clark visited these riot victims, who requested firearms to protect themselves, and Sheriff Clark denied the request.

On Monday, August 5, around 1,000 white coal mine workers in Spring Valley gathered and concluded that African Americans residents of Spring Valley had "until 5 o'clock Tuesday evening" to clear out their houses and leave for good. Anything African Americans left behind was to be confiscated or destroyed.

The response from Spring Valley's—and Illinois's—African American community was swift, as Chicago community leaders sent a letter to John Peter Altgeld, the governor of Illinois, expressing outrage at the lack of safety provided by city and state officials. However, the governor did not respond until the next morning, when he said that he would not provide troops to aid Spring Valley residents in the aftermath of the riot. Reverend J.M. Townsend, the pastor of Quinn Chapel in Chicago, held meetings with various members of the African-American community, where they began an investigation into the riot, and "raised fourteen hundred dollars" for the Spring Valley community. The investigation concluded that local and state authorities should have responded more promptly to aid the Spring Valley African-American community.

African American residents of Spring Valley congregated at Union Church in nearby Seatonville at one o'clock in the morning. They raised money and discussed how they would combat the riots as a community. It was resolved that African Americans were to continue seeking refuge in Seatonville and that a select group would travel to Princeton to grab weapons and supplies for protection. City officials in Princeton were sympathetic to Spring Valley's African Americans while Spring Valley officials tended to support the immigrant rioters. Mayor Delmagro wanted the suspected rioters tried in Spring Valley rather than Princeton. Although many local leaders in Princeton originally fought this proposition, Delmagro was eventually successful in moving the trial to Spring Valley.

== Riot commentary ==
=== Contemporary commentary ===
==== Media coverage ====
Caroline Waldron Merithew brings attention to the context surrounding the unfolding events by referencing several local and regional newspaper articles that illustrate the varying perceptions about the riot, noting that a reporter for the Richmond Planet wrote, "The Southern bourbon [black]-hater is not present in Illinois, but the Italian has arisen in his stead." and Topeka, Kansas's Weekly Call stated, "The dago, rioters, anarchists, rebellionists and assassins" had in essence taken the town. During this era, there were several ethnically based papers in operation, and Merithew highlights their contributions during the strike in 1894 and then again during the Spring Valley riot of 1895. L'Italia, a small Italian newspaper, accused the mining company of hiring African American workers to replace Italians because their labor was cheaper. After the shooting of Barney Rollo, this paper reported that "Italians and people from other nationalities [were] indignant," and continued saying, "Blacks had given the ultimate and most terrible provocation." Vorbote, a newspaper published in German, agreed, saying that, "Yes, in less than two hours, 5000 battle-ready white miners would be assembled. The workers say that they had silently endured the infringements of [blacks] long enough."

==== Politicians ====
In the days following the riot, Altgeld's secretary William F. Dose claimed that the governor had sent Assistant Adjutant General Hugh E. Bayle and George Schilling as his representatives to assess the scene of the riots in Spring Valley. Bayle and Schilling's response was that "the whole affair amounted to little more than a street fight between personal enemies and did not at any time assume the proportions of a race war." Despite the office of the Governor's attempts to minimize the altercation between the European immigrants and African American's of Spring Valley, "it became apparent that the matter had gotten out of hand." Spring Valley was still under the control of the Italian miners. On August 10, 1895, after a telegram sent the day before by John C. Buckner, an Illinois representative of the Fifth District in Chicago, the city of Spring Valley received "ten armed colored special policemen and forty-five additional white patrolmen" to protect the exiled African Americans while they traveled back to Spring Valley from Seatonville. The Governor's still office attempted to downplay the events of Spring Valley even two weeks after the fact, with Dose stating on August 23 that it was "merely a street fight among ignorant and drunken laborers."

The events of Spring Valley had caused Altgeld to recommend "the passage of a law prohibiting the importation into Illinois of squads of men to take the jobs of other men." A biographer of Altgeld's, Harry Barnard, states in "Eagle Forgotten" that "Altgeld had been moved to make this recommendation by the serious situation which had developed at Spring Valley, Illinois." Legislation was not enacted, however, until the succeeding Governor John Riley Tanner passed a bill that "prohibited employers from inducing workmen to go from one place to another within the state and from bringing workmen into the state." This bill was aimed at preventing companies such as Spring Valley Steel Company from bringing in "strike-breaking negroes." The bill was deemed unconstitutional in 1911 by the Illinois Supreme Court on the grounds that it imposed upon employers "a different measure of liability, both civil and criminal, for deceit and misrepresentation from that imposed on other persons."

=== Post-riot commentary ===
==== Scholars and writers ====
Scholar Caroline Waldron argues in her 2000 journal article "'Lynch-law Must Go!': Race, Citizenship, and the Other in an American Coal Mining Town" that the riot's African American victims were able to win the legal case against their attackers due to the Quinn Chapel funding their legal fees and by garnering support from powerful individuals and groups in Chicago.

Scholar Felix Armfield argues in his 2000 journal article "Fire on the Prairie: The 1895 Spring Valley Race Riot" that the government, and Governor Altgeld more specifically, failed to adequately respond to the riots in a way that would help African American victims. Armfield argues that Altgeld worked to preserve the interests of the immigrant population in Spring Valley in the riot.

== Aftermath ==
=== Arrests ===
In response to the public outcry against the rioters, approximately twenty-five miners were arrested and charged with rioting and violent criminal activities. When the trial against the rioters concluded in November, eight men were found guilty of rioting and committing violent criminal activities. Seven of these men were sent to jail, and one did not serve any time behind bars, because he was under 21 years old and could not be arrested under Illinois law.

Although there were "fourteen casualties and six reported missing" in the aftermath of August 3, 1895, everyone survived.

=== Rebuilding Spring Valley ===
After the riots ended, the Quinn Chapel committee encouraged the riot victims to file civil suits against Spring Valley in order to obtain compensation. The committee also provided victims with food and urged African Americans to join public organizations, in order for them to properly respond to any riot in the future. Spring Valley's black population also formed assemblies to hold rioters accountable for their violent actions.

Shortly after the riot, a meeting of about 600 mine workers, presumed to be part of the United Mine Workers of America (UMWA), met to take an official position on the events of the riot. Several miners drafted a statement that they did not condone the actions of the miners involved in the riot, but many disagreed with this stance and exited the meeting because they feared that African American miners would be allowed back into Spring Valley. A vote was held on whether or not to accept the statement that condemned the actions of the rioters as the official stance of the miners, which passed in favor of accepting the statement.

Spring Valley Coal Mine Manager Dalzell and Union leaders James O'Connor and John Mitchell came to an agreement that Dalzell would rehire workers who were fired amidst the 1894 Coal Mine Strike, and that the UMWA would allow African American workers to return to the mines after the riot.

=== Post-riot demographics of Bureau County ===
By 1900, according to that year's census, the county's white population had risen from 34,742 residents to 40,813, whereas the black population rose from 271 residents to only 299. The small growth in the county's black population was in large part due to the 1895 riot.
