= John Buckner =

John Buckner may refer to:

- John Buckner (bishop) (1734–1824), Anglican clergyman and Bishop of Chichester
- John Buckner (Colorado politician) (1947–2015), member of the Colorado House of Representatives
- John Buckner (burgess) (died c. 1695), member of the Virginia House of Burgesses
- John C. Buckner, state legislator in Illinois

== See also ==
- Jack Buckner (born 1961), British athlete
