= PhSeZn-halides =

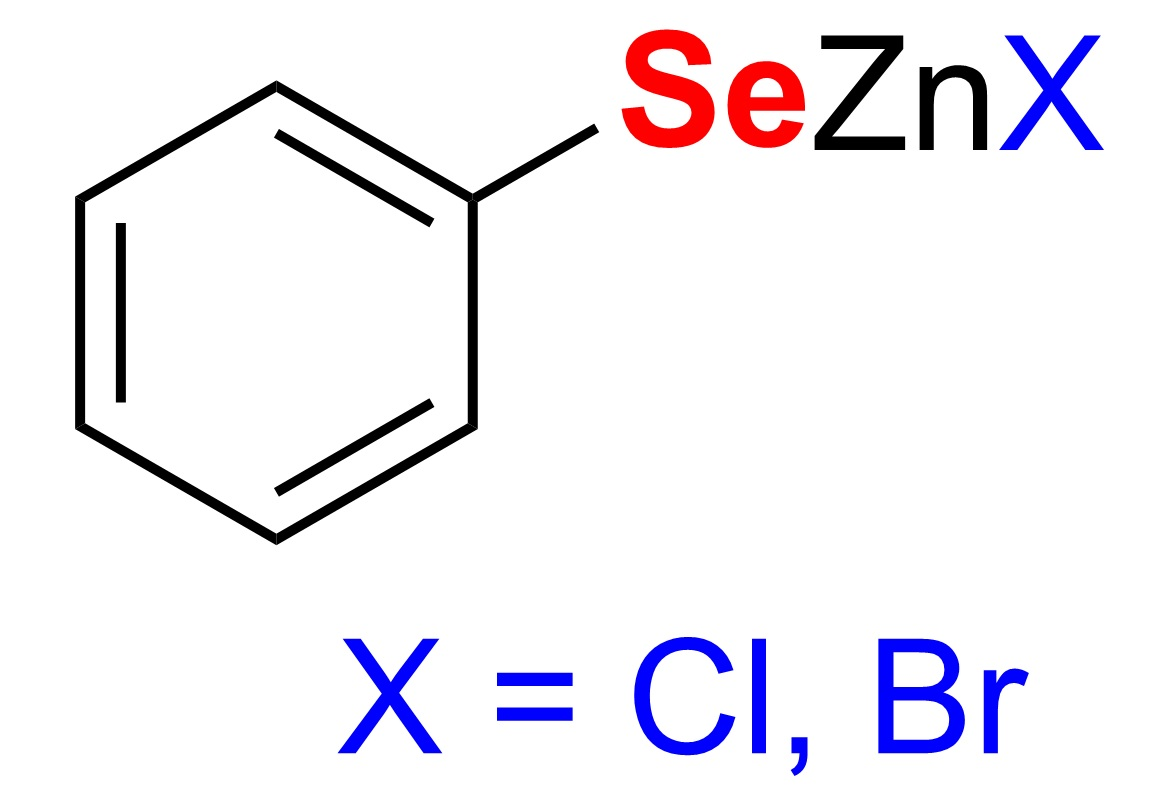
PhSeZn-halides (Santi's reagent)

PhSeZn-halides (Santi's reagent) is a class of chemical compounds with general formula PhSeZnX (X = Cl, Br). This is the first example of bench stable zinc selenolates with a remarkable nucleophilic reactivity under on-water conditions. The synthesis and application of these reagents were first reported by Dr. Claudio Santi of the University of Perugia in 2008. In 2016, the lead compound (PhSeZnCl) becomes commercially available.

== Laboratory preparation ==
PhSeX + Zn → PhSeZnX
