= Accursia =

Accursia of Accorsia (ca. 1230–1281) was allegedly an Italian jurist from Bologna, whose existence is debated.

Said to be a daughter of prominent Bolognan lawyer Accorso da Bagnolo, Accursia is said to have taught law in the Bologna studium, becoming a model of a cultured woman, capable of carrying out the activities reserved for men. She is also said to have written a tract about "whether a woman should be taken by an educated man, and if so what sort of man?"

Doubts about the existence of Accursia arose in the Eighteenth Century when the Camaldolese father Mauro Sarti, historian of the University of Bologna, found no trace of her in the ancient documents of the studium. The earliest mention of Accursia is found in a document by the jurist Alberico da Rosciate, who wrote "I heard that Accursius had a daughter, who actually studied at Bologna" suggesting that her existence was dubious.

While there is some doubt about there being a female lawyer named Accursia, there are better documented female jurists of the medieval era like Bettisia Gozzadini, lending some credibility to more female jurists operating in 13th century Bologna.

== Biography ==
Accursia would have been the daughter of the great glossator Accursio: according to Guido Panciroli, Accursia would also have taught Law in the University of Bologna Accursia therefore became the model of a cultured woman, capable of performing the activities reserved by society for men.Accursia was attributed among other things with a pamphlet, Dissertatio de literati matrimonio, the traces of which, however, have been lost.

Doubts about Accursia's existence arose in the 18th century, after the Camaldolese Father Mauro Sarti, a historian at the University of Bologna, found no trace of the jurist in the ancient documents of the Studio. The earliest mention of Accursia is in fact found in a document by the jurist Alberico da Rosciate (1290-1360), who, however, already spoke of her as hearsay (“audivi quod Accursius unam filiam habuit, quae actu legebat Bononiae, etc.”); but Alberico's cautions did not prevent Accursia's fame from developing and, indeed, other unlikely biographical data were attributed to her. Among the supporters of its existence was Alessandro Macchiavelli, who worked to impose the vulgate of the learned Bolognese graduates of the Alma Mater in ancient times, including through the production of Bettisia Gozzadini. Skeptics include in particular Girolamo Tiraboschi, who takes up Sarti and reveals Macchiavelli's forgeries.

== See also ==
- Novella d'Andrea
