= Anita Seppilli =

Italian cultural anthropologist (1902–1992)

- Born: Anita Schwarzkopf; 29 August 1902; Fiume
- Died: 19 March 1991 (aged 88); Perugia, Italy
- Education: University of Florence
- Occupation: Cultural anthropologist
- Known for: Magical thinking and symbolic experience
- Spouse: Alessandro Seppilli
- Children: 1

Anita Seppilli (1902–1992) (née Schwarzkopf) was an Italian cultural anthropologist and classical philologist who became known for her research and teachings about poetry and magic in relation to the ethnography and anthropology of South American and world cultures.

== Biography ==
The daughter of Maria Luisa Treves and Emilio Schwarzkopf, she was born in Fiume (now Rijeka, Croatia) on 29 August 1902. The family moved to Trieste, Italy, when she was very young, and her father became a prominent member of the city's Jewish community. She studied literature at the University of Florence and graduated with a thesis in classical philology.

=== Reviewer ===
She married the hygienist/medic Alessandro Seppilli, a high school acquaintance, on 9 September 1923, in a Trieste synagogue. In 1926, the young couple moved to Padua, where he was hired as an assistant professor at the Institute of Hygiene at the University of Padua. In 1928, she gave birth to their son, Tullio, who would become an anthropologist. She was active in Padua's social and cultural life. As a writer, between 1934 and 1938, she became a contributor to La Rassegna Mensile di Israel (The Monthly Review of Israel) and was published in the "Bollettino Bibliografico" column. By 1935, her husband had become a lecturer in hygiene at the University of Modena.

With the advent of Italian racial laws against Jews in 1938, her husband's teaching license was revoked and their son was no longer allowed to attend school. They left Italy in self-exile, taking refuge in Brazil for the duration of World War II, landing at Santos, São Paulo, on 4 July 1939. Soon they were joined there by their extended family who dubbed the large community of emigrants as the "Mussolini colony." (Their visas were provided by an unnamed Brazilian microbiologist, who had met Alessandro Seppilli at an international conference. He had a relative in the Brazilian government who expedited the permanent permits.)

=== Cultural anthropologist ===
Anita Seppilli spent her time in Brazil giving private lessons on antiquity and the history of literature. At the Municipal Library of São Paulo, she immersed herself in self study about the ethnography and anthropology of South American cultures including those "flourishing in Brazil and intertwining the Austro-German historical-cultural school, French socio-anthropology, and American cultural anthropology, but she also rediscovered ancient Middle Eastern cultures. Thus were defined the interests, curiosities and borderline skills that from then on would characterize her figure as a scholar, in which ethnology and history of religions merged with classical and Germanic education, to give life to a special comparative anthropology, publishing various articles in Brazilian and Argentinean magazines."

With the End of World War II in Europe in 1946, her family returned to Italy, where Seppilli devoted her energies to cultural anthropological studies. She focused on magical thinking and symbolic experience and the relationship between magic and poetry. By magic she includes "a variety of cultural themes" and by poetry she concerns herself with a certain "poetic quality." She taught cultural anthropology for many years at the University of Perugia, and she joined the peace movement there. She participated in an International Peace Conference in Vienna, Austria.

With her son as co-author, she published a book in 1964 titled, The Exploration of the Amazon, which became quite popular.

According to Buseghin, "In the 1970s and 1980s, she returned to ancient cultures, particularly Roman, Greek, Middle Eastern, and Etruscan symbolic complexes, focusing on rediscovering the hidden meaning of no longer intelligible symbols present in certain folkloric traditions: the Gubbio Candle Festival, the Sibyl of Norcia, the sacredness of water and the sacrilege of bridges, the ritual of giving, and the Tomb of the Bulls in Etruscan Tarquinia."

Anita Seppilli died in Perugia on 19 March 1991.

== Selected works ==
- Poetry and Magic, Turin, Einaudi, 1962; then: Palermo, Sellerio, 2011
- The exploration of the Amazon, (with Tullio Seppilli), Turin, UTET, 1964
- The candles of Gubbio: a historical-cultural essay on a folkloric festival, (with Fernando Costantini), Perugia, University of Perugia, 1972
- The Sacredness of Water and the Sacrilege of Bridges, Palermo, Sellerio, 1977
- Memory and Absence, Bologna, Cappelli, 1979
- In Search of the Lost Meaning, Palermo, Sellerio, 1986
- The Mystery of the Tomb of the Bulls in Etruscan Tarquinia, Palermo, Sellerio, 1990

== External sources ==
- Anita Schwarzkopf Seppilli: vita travagliata (e appassionata) di una grande antropologa
