= Pier Paolo Pandolfi =

Italian cancer geneticist

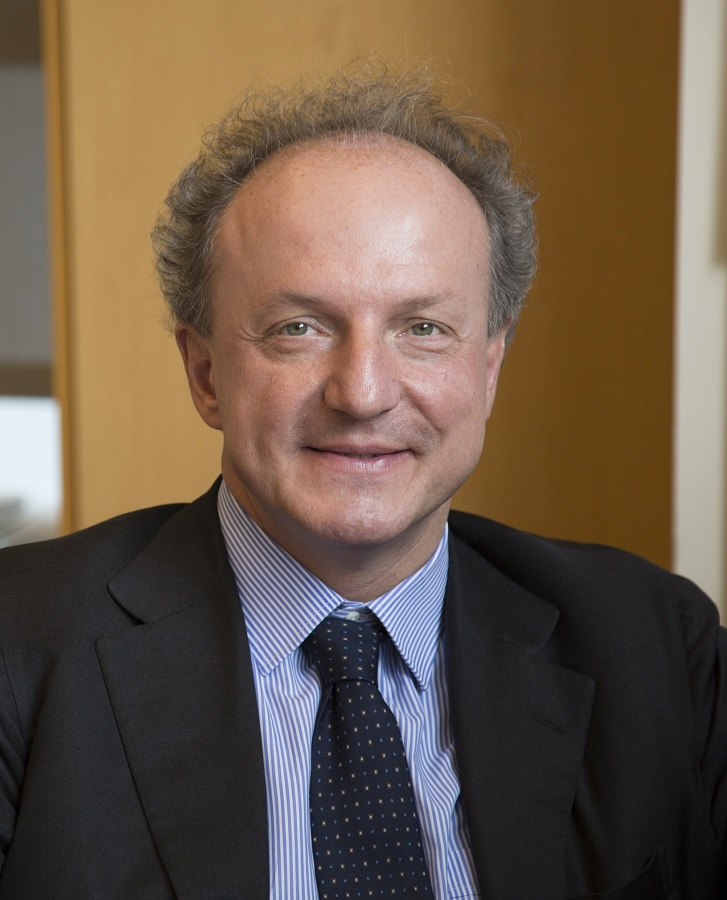
- Born: Italy
- Education: University of Perugia, Italy
- Scientific career
- Fields: cancer genetics; biochemistry; cell biology
- Workplaces: Harvard Medical School; Beth Israel Deaconess Medical Center
- Website: pandolfilab.org

Pier Paolo Pandolfi is an Italian doctor, geneticist, molecular biologist, and cancer researcher.

== Early life and education ==
Originally from Rome, Italy, Pandolfi studied medicine at the University of Perugia in Umbria in central Italy, where he began his research into acute promyelocytic leukemia. He received his MD in 1989, his Ph.D. in 1995, and did postgraduate work at the Royal Postgraduate Medical School.

== Research ==
In 1994, Pandolfi moved his research to the Memorial Sloan-Kettering Cancer Center in New York City and joined the faculty of Weill Cornell Graduate School of Medical Sciences as a professor of molecular biology, pathology, and human genetics. Pandolfi eventually became the chair of cancer biology and genetics and the head of the molecular and developmental biology lab at Sloan-Kettering.

Pandolfi left Sloan-Kettering in 2007 to become the director of Beth Israel Deaconess Medical Center's new cancer genetics program. While there he was the George C. Reisman professor of medicine at Harvard Medical School and an associate member of the Broad Institute of MIT and Harvard University. He became the director of the BIDMC Cancer Center and Cancer Research Institute in 2013. Pandolfi received the Pezcoller Foundation-American Association for Cancer Research International Award for Cancer Research in 2011 and was elected as an Fellow of the American Association for the Advancement of Science in 2017 in recognition of his cancer research.

== Scandal ==
Between fall 2018 and spring 2019, Pandofi pursued an inappropriate relationship with a postdoctoral researcher. A Harvard internal investigation referred him to an external evaluation service that allowed him to return to work. In December 2019, Pandolfi resigned from Harvard. In May 2020, he became the director of the Institute of Cancer at Renown Health, joined the faculty of the Desert Research Institute, and was announced as the scientific director of the Veneto Institute of Molecular Medicine (VIMM) in Padua, Italy. The VIMM scientific advisory board resigned in protest because they had not been consulted before Pandolfi's appointment. The VIMM foundation reversed their decision to appoint Pandolfi in June 2020, and he resigned from his position at the Desert Research institute.
