= Orto Botanico dell'Università di Perugia =

Botanical garden in Perugia, Umbria, Italy

The Orto Botanico dell'Università di Perugia (20,000 m^{2}) is a botanical garden operated by the University of Perugia. It is located at Borgo XX Giugno 74, Perugia, Umbria, Italy, and open to the public daily.

Today's garden was established in 1962 between Via San Costanzo and Via Romana, as a successor to Perugia's first botanical garden (1768), which was moved and re-established several times over the centuries. It currently contains about 3000 species, including:

- Aquatic plants - Azolla filiculoides, Caltha palustris, Cyperus papyrus, Eichhornia crassipes, Iris pseudacorus, Lemna minor, Ligularia tussilaginea, Lythrum salicaria, Nelumbo nucifera, Nymphaea, Pistia stratiotes, Salvinia natans, and Trapa natans.
- Arboretum - Castanea, Fagus, Loranthus, Populus, Quercus, Salix, and Viscum.
- Fruits - Amelanchier, Carica papaya, Carya olivaeformis (C. oliviformis, a synonym of C. illinoinensis), Coffea arabica, Fragaria, Malus, Musa, Nephelium litchi, Piper nigrum, Psidium, Ribes, Rubus, Prunus, and Sorbus.
- Succulents - Aeonium, Aloe, Bowiea volubilis, Cereus, Ceropegia, Cotyledon, Crassula lycopodioides, Espostoa, Euphorbiaceae, Gasteria, Haworthia, Kalanchoe, Pachypodium, Sedum, Sempervivum, and Stapelia.
- Tropical and subtropical plants - Cajanus cajan, Cucurbita foetidissima, Dracaena draco, Erythrina crista-galli, Feijoa sellowiana, Persea americana, Plumeria alba, Psophocarpus tetragonolobus, and Tamarillo.
- Useful plants - Althaea, Angelica, Atropa, Carlina, Conium, Digitalis, Humulus, Inula, Levisticum, Malva, Marrubium, Mentha, Rheum, Salvia, Satureja, Solanum, Tanacetum, Thymus, and Valeriana.

It also contains an alpine garden, zen garden, a large collection of Hydrangea, and greenhouse (700 m^{2}).

== See also ==
- List of botanical gardens in Italy
