= Accursius =

Italian jurist (d. 1263)

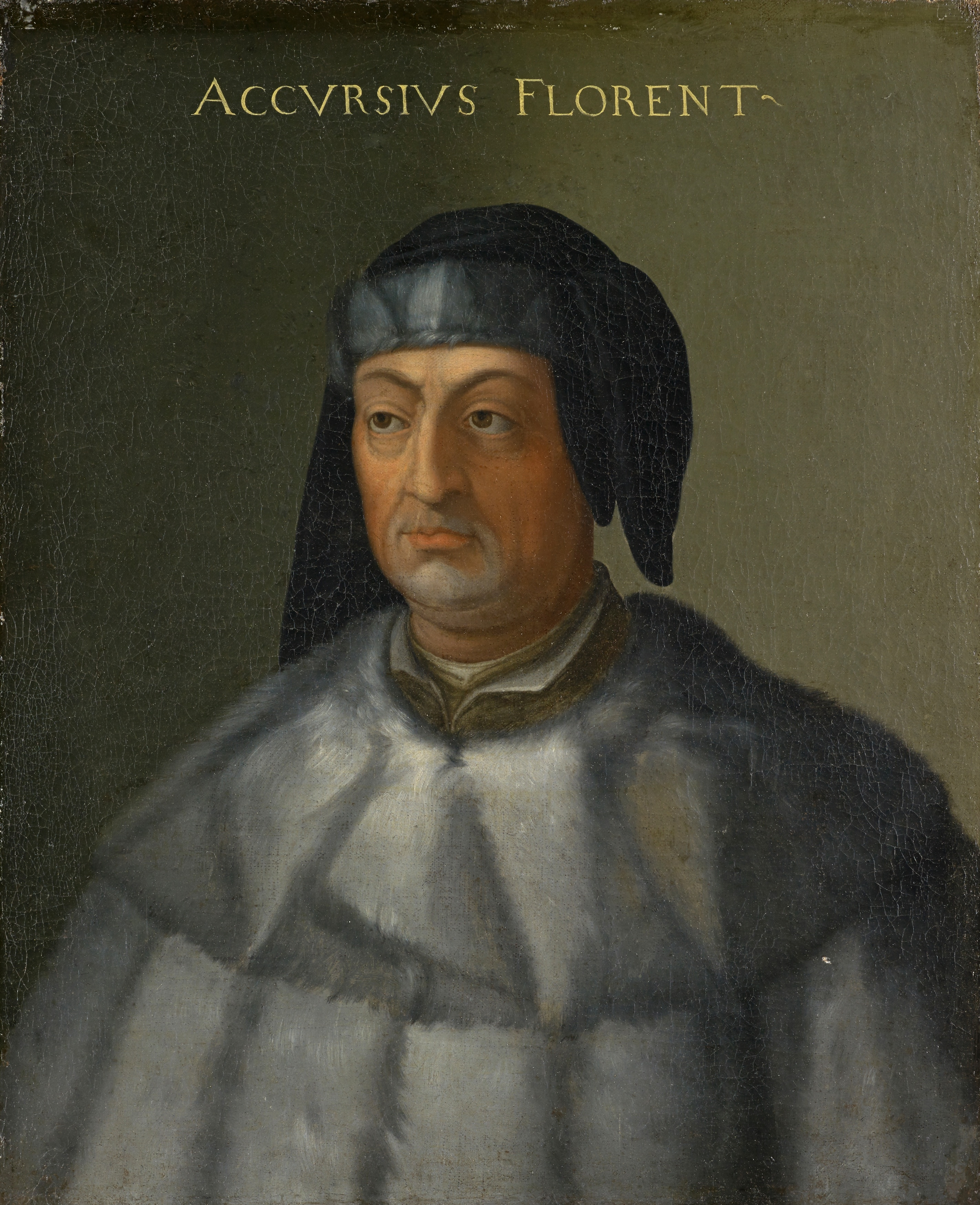
Accursius by Cristofano dell'Altissimo.

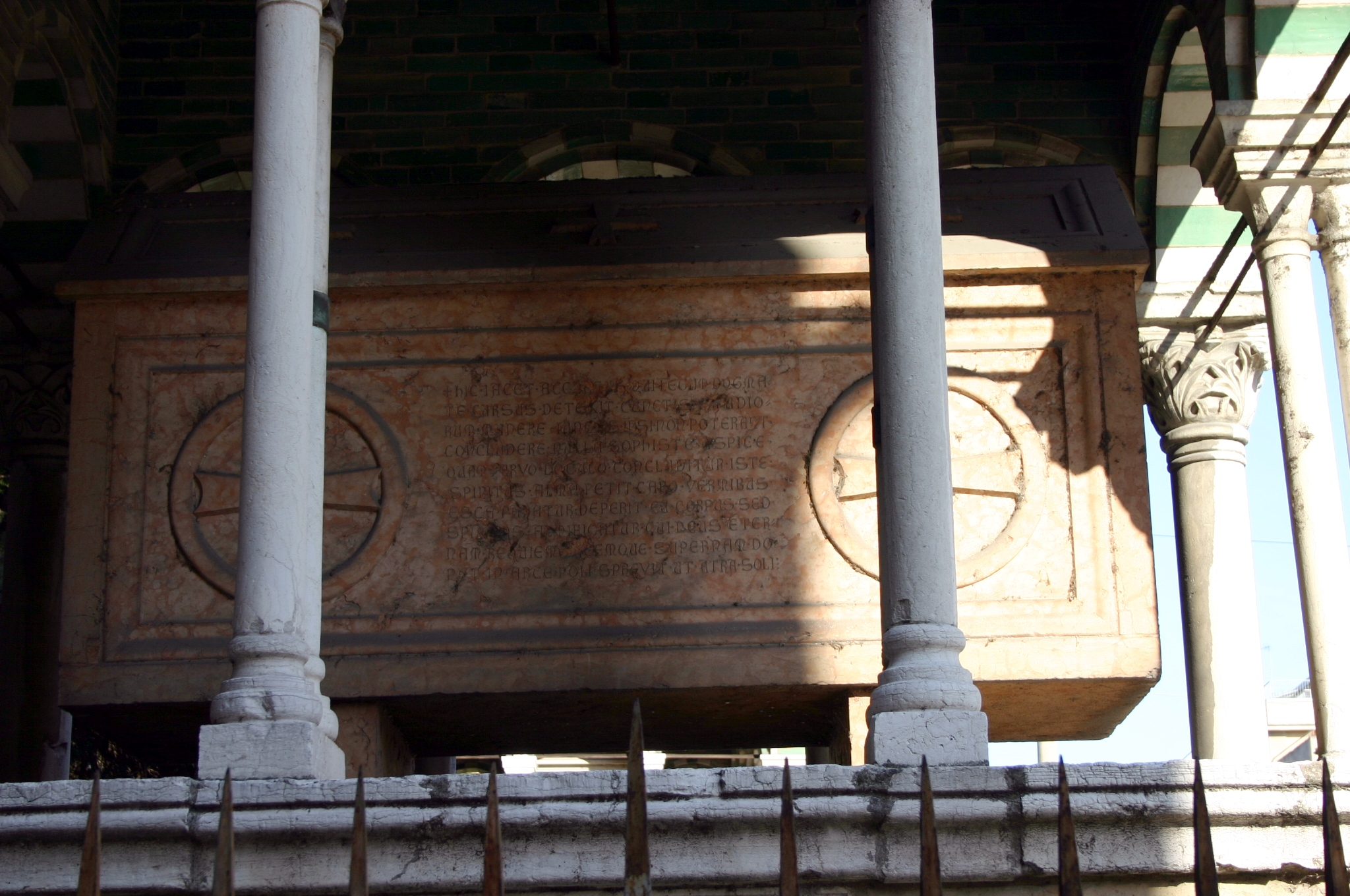
The grave for Accursius and for his son Franciscus, in Bologna, Italy.

Accursius (Italian: Accursio or Accorso di Bagnolo; c. 1182 – 1263) was an Italian jurist. He is notable for his organization of the glosses, the medieval comments on Justinian's codification of Roman law, the Corpus Juris Civilis. He was not proficient in the classics, but he was called "the Idol of the Jurisconsults".

== Biography ==
Accursius was born at Impruneta, near Florence. A pupil of Azo, he first practised law in his native city, and was afterwards appointed professor at Bologna, where he had great success as a teacher. He undertook to arrange into one body the tens of thousands of comments and remarks upon the Code, the Institutes and Digests. Accursius assembled from the various earlier glosses for each of these texts a coherent and consistent body of glosses. This compilation, soon given the title Glossa ordinaria or magistralis, and usually known as the Great Gloss, was essentially complete at about 1230. While Accursius was employed in this work, legend has it that, hearing of a similar one proposed and begun by Odofred, another lawyer of Bologna, he feigned indisposition, interrupted his public lectures, and shut himself up, till with the utmost expedition he had accomplished his design.

After the middle of the 13th century, the Gloss had grown to be the starting point for every exegesis of the Corpus Iuris, and was even given force of law in some jurisdictions. The authority of the Gloss is probably due to Accursius' very exhaustive coverage of the civil law, in the course of which he not only pointed out its problems but unlike his predecessors also offered solutions for them. Indeed, modern research has shown that Accursius' work contains nearly 100,000 glosses. The best edition is that of Denis Godefroy, published at Lyon in 1589, in six folio volumes.

Apart from his work as a glossator, Accursius was also engaged very profitably as a legal consultant.

He lived and taught during the later years of his life at Bologna where he died in 1263. It was acknowledged that after his death the legal science in Italy suffered a decline.

== Family ==
Three of his four sons were also jurists: Cervottus, Guilelmus and the noted Franciscus. The latter is buried with his father in one of the arcs lining the street near the Basilica of San Francesco, Bologna. There was a legend that he had a daughter, Accursia, who was also a jurist.

== Recognition ==
For his magnum opus, Accursius was extolled by the lawyers of his own and the immediately succeeding age as the greatest glossator, and he was even called the idol of jurisconsults, but those of later times formed a lower estimate of his merits. Eventually, 16th century humanists, including Rabelais in his Gargantua and Pantagruel, polemically criticised Accursius' Gloss.

Accursius' majestic residence on the Piazza Maggiore was later expanded into the Palazzo Comunale, or the town hall.

Renaissance editions of Accursius' glosses

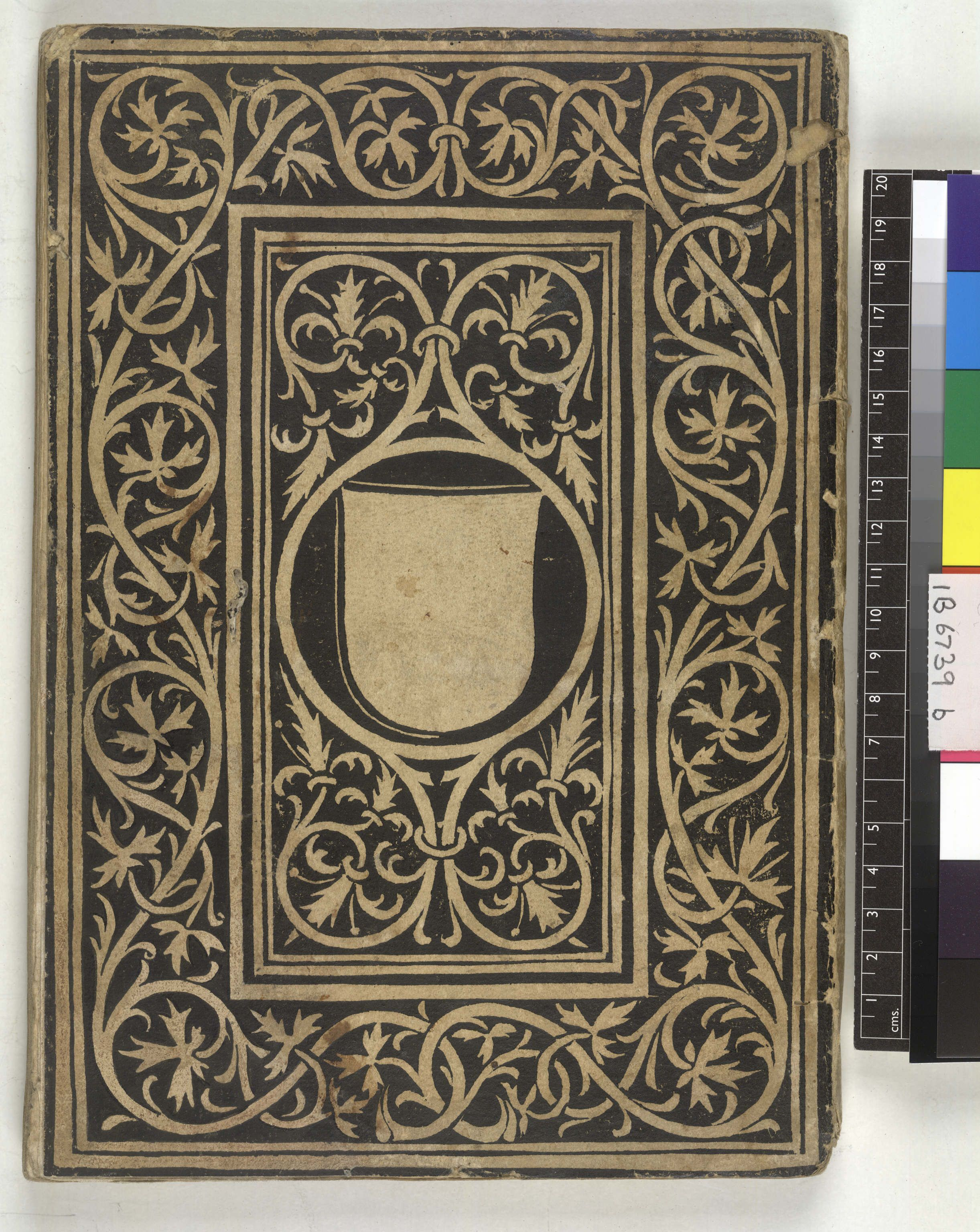
Glossa ordinaria of Accursius

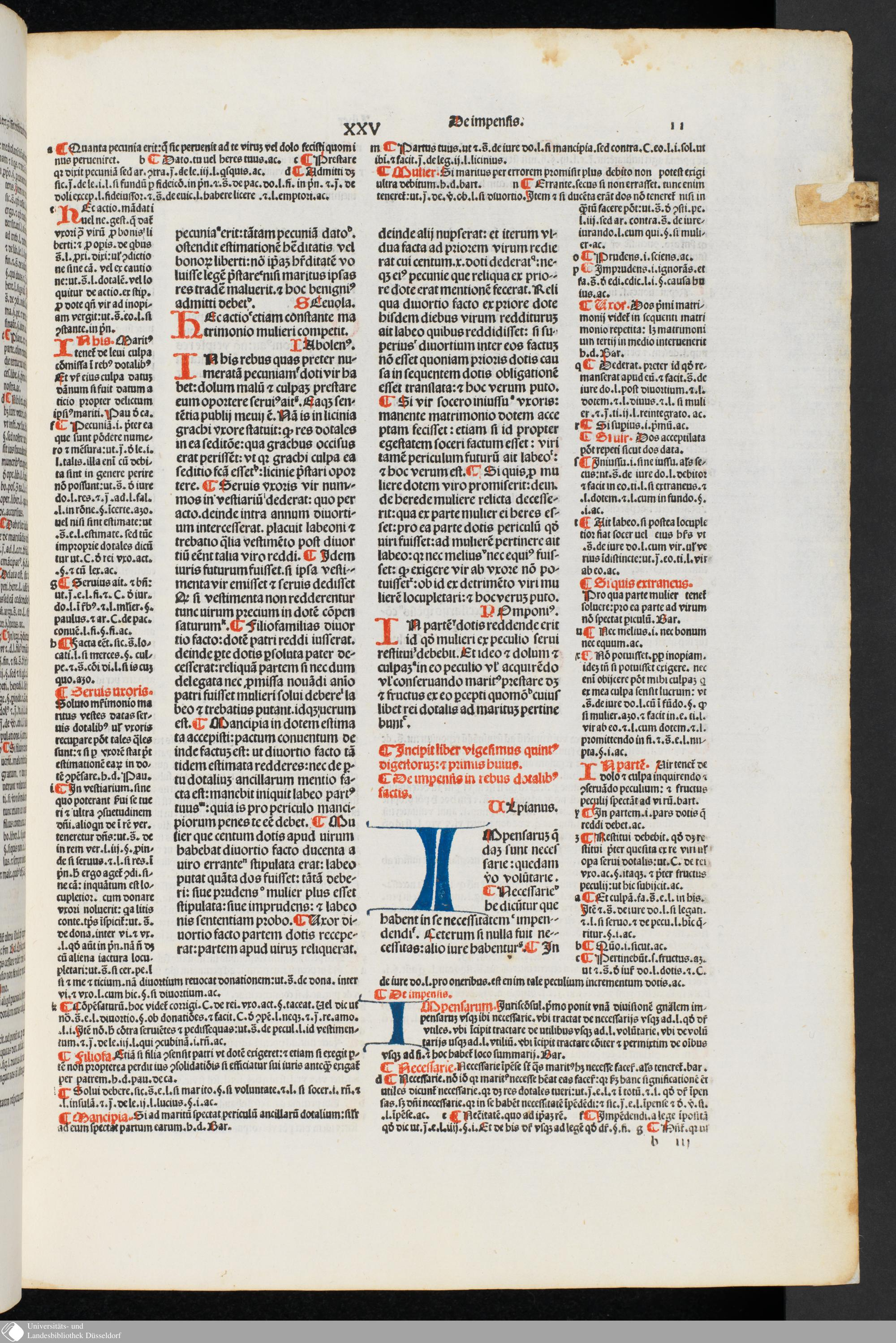
Corpus iuris civilis (Digesta Justiniani) with Glossa ordinaria by Accursius

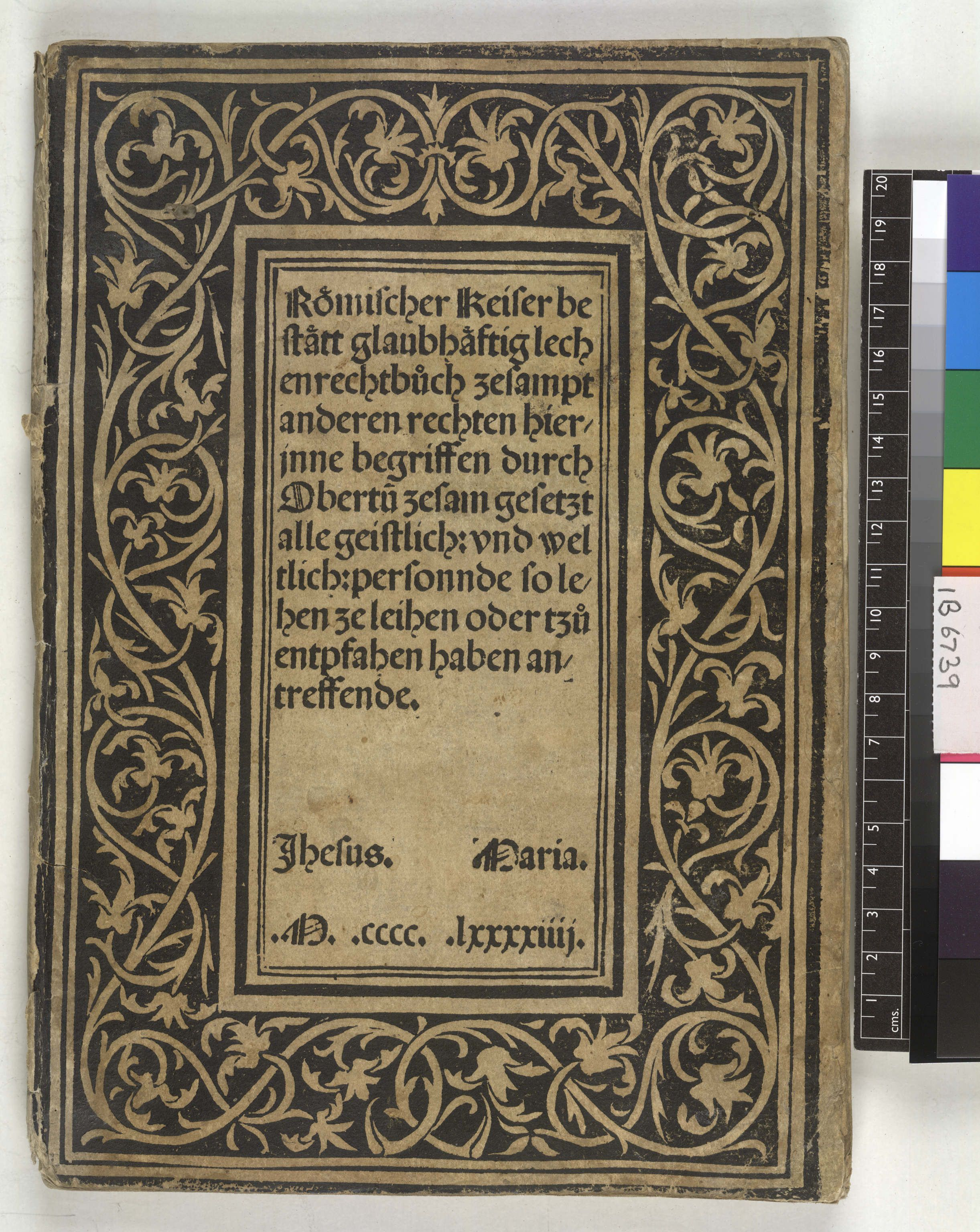
libre Fedorum by Accursius

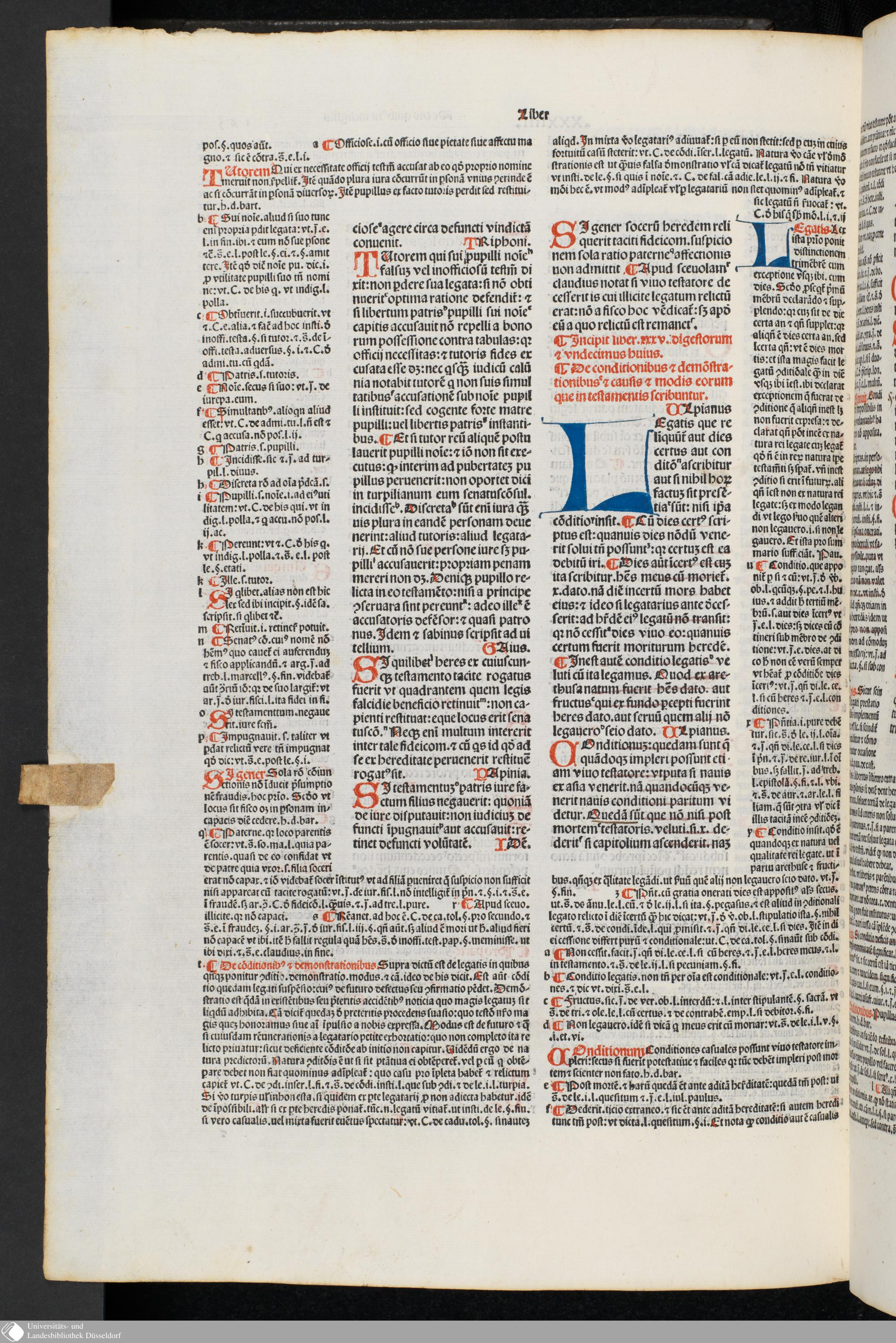
Digesta Justiniani Infortiatum by Accursius

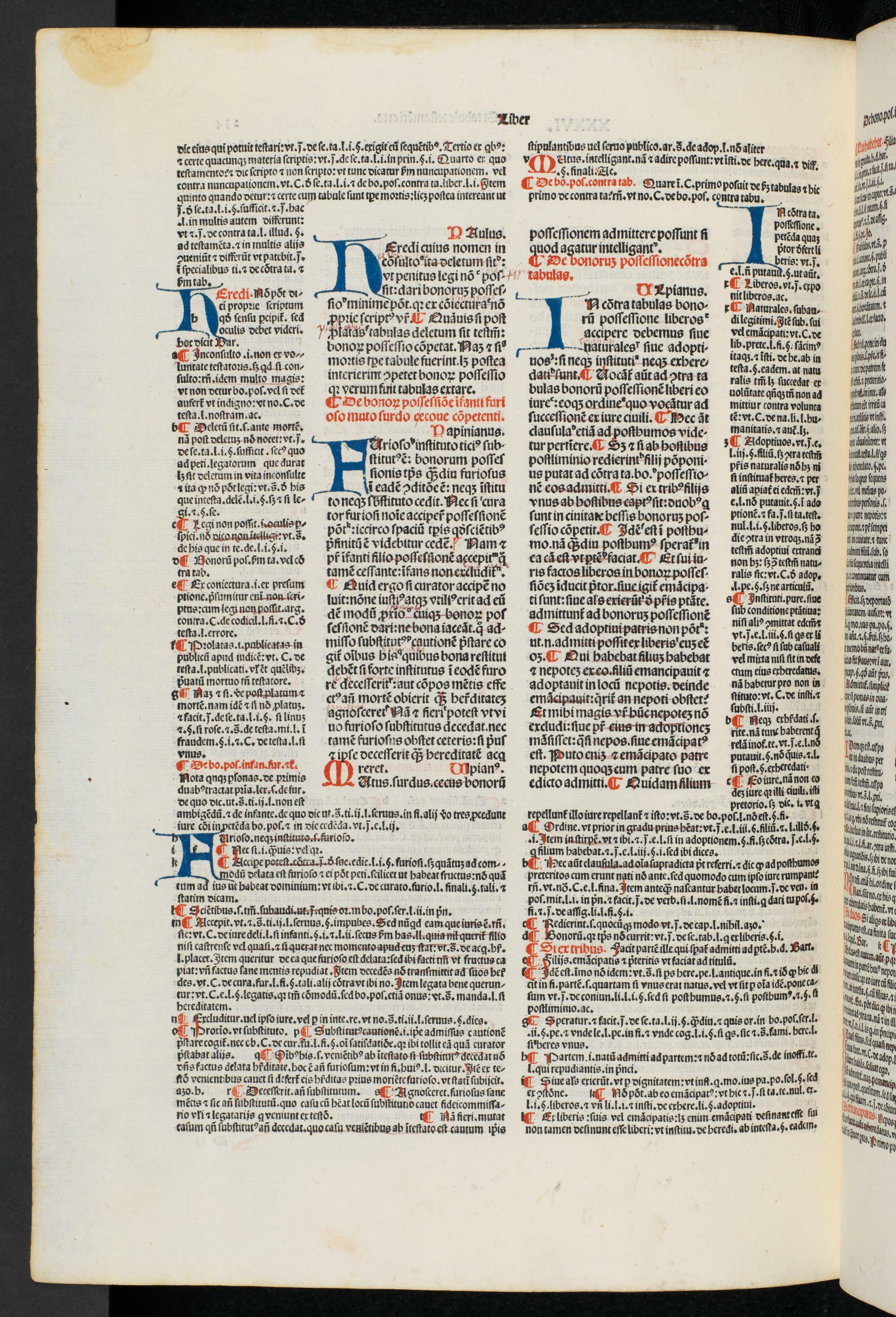
Digesta Justiniani Infortiatum with Glossa ordinaria by Accursius

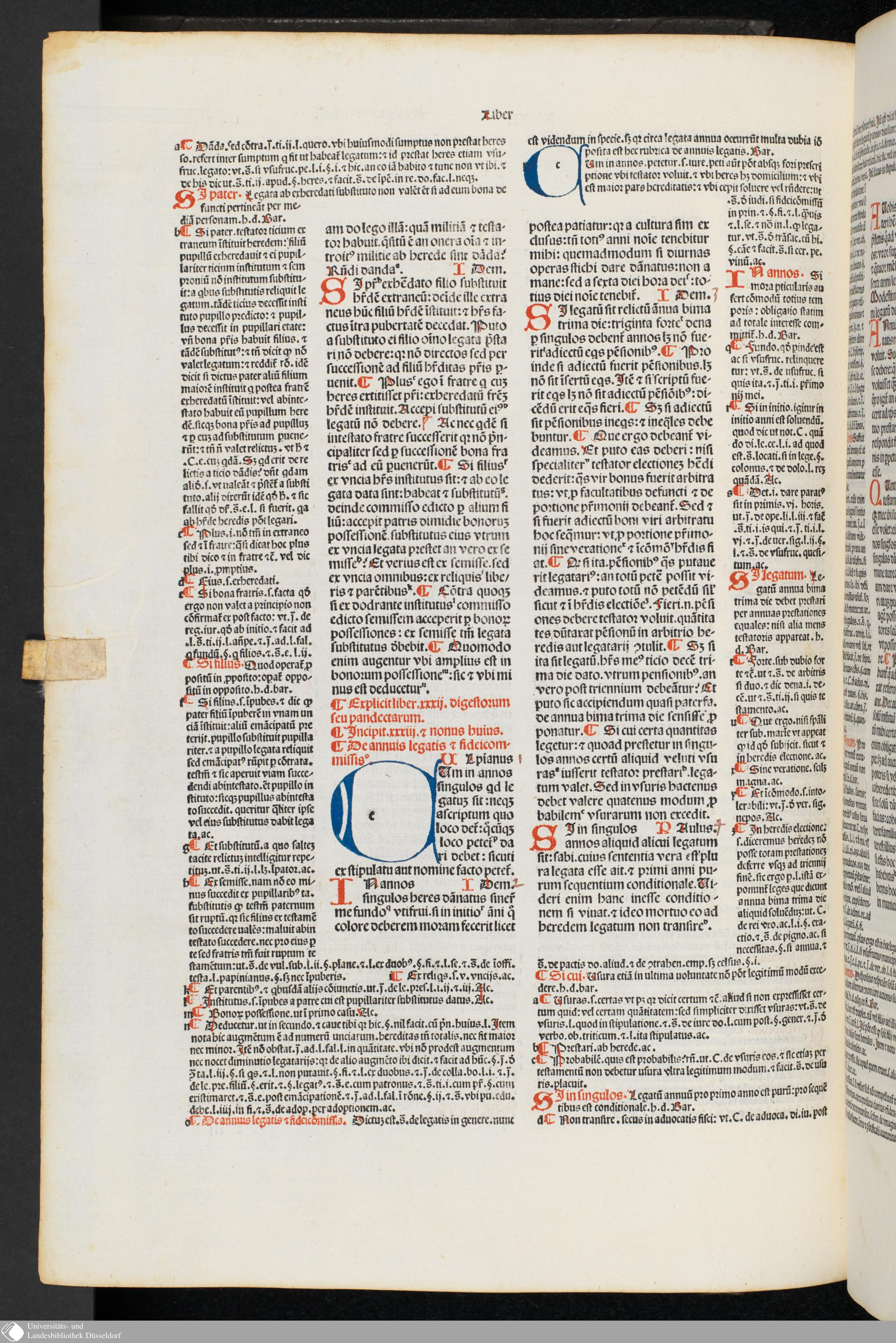
Digesta Justiniani with 1495 Gloss by Accursius

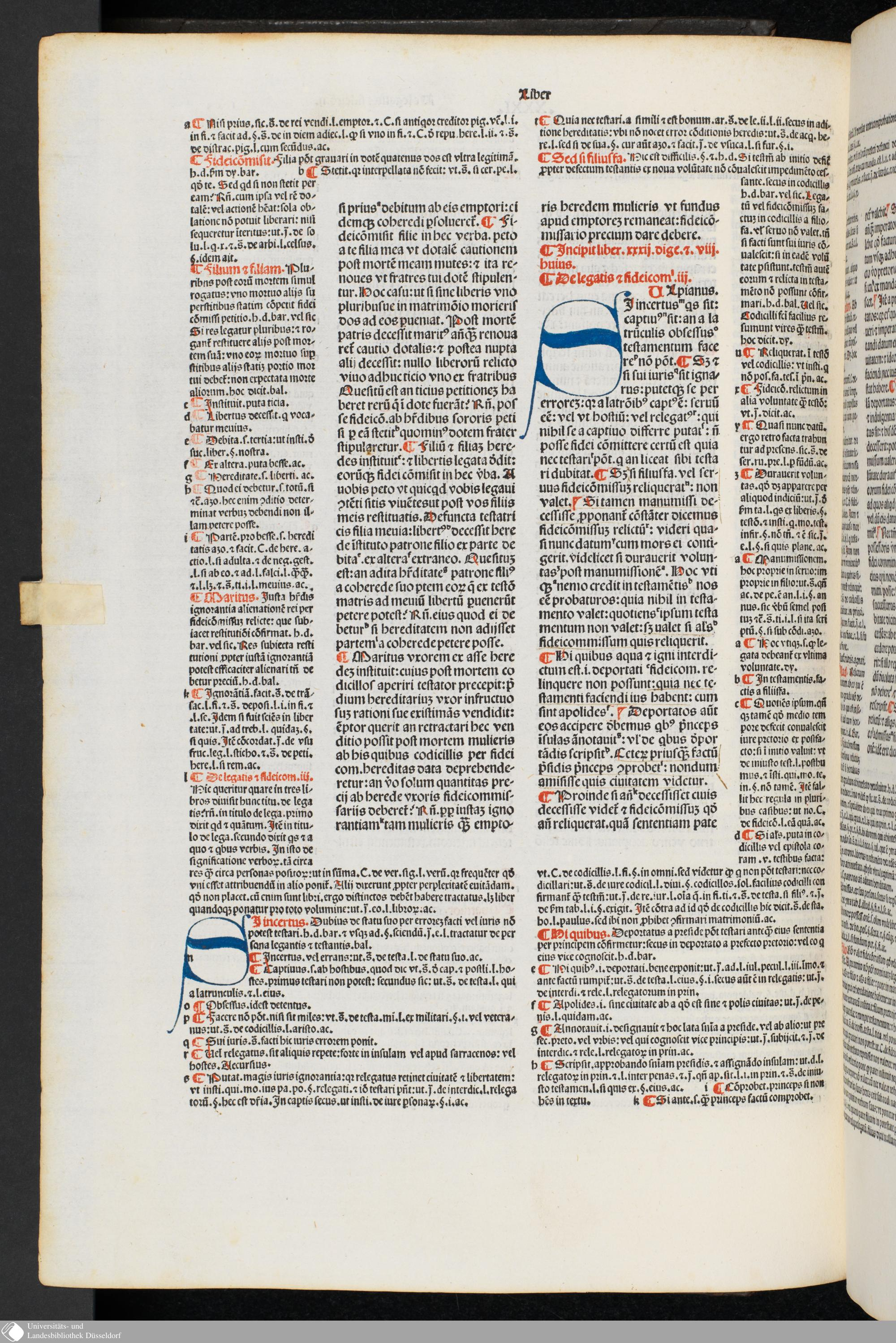
Digesta Justiniani with 1495 Gloss by Accursius

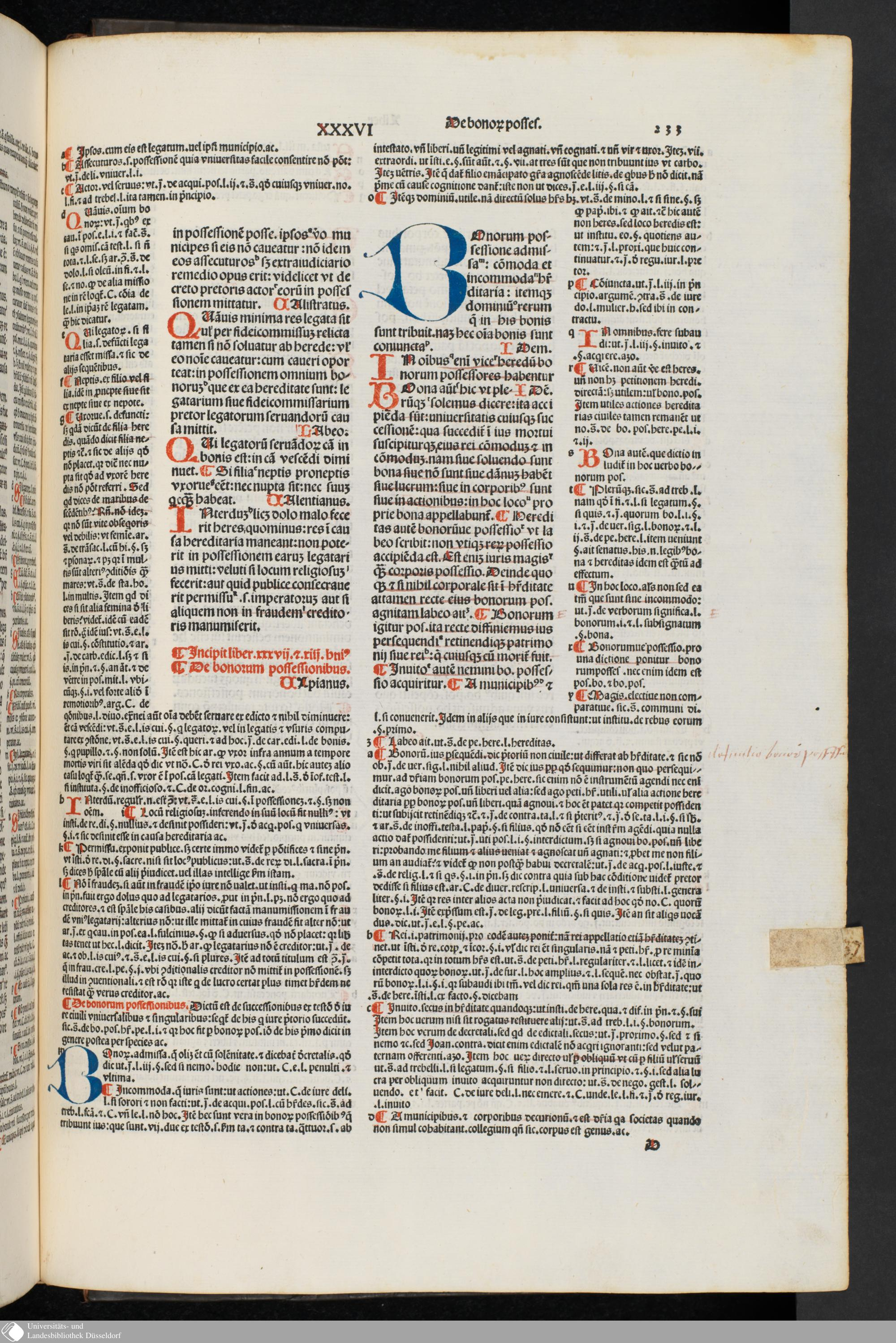
Corpus iuris civilis (Digesta Justiniani) with 1495 Gloss by Accursius

== See also ==
- Cuius est solum eius est usque ad coelum et ad inferos – credited to Accursius
- Henry de Bracton
