= Italiano (disambiguation) =

Italiano, or the Italian language, is a Romance language of the Indo-European language family.

Italiano or Italiana may also refer to anything originating from or associated with Italy:

- L'Italiano (magazine), weekly literary magazine between 1926 and 1942 in Italy
- L'Italiano, a 1983 song by Toto Cutugno
- L'Italiano (newspaper), a newspaper in Argentina
- Italiana (album), an album by the Italian singer Mina
- Sueca Italiana, a variant of the game briscola
- Vincenzo Italiano, an Italian football manager and former player

== See also ==
- Italian (disambiguation)
