= Franciscus Accursius =

Italian jurist (1225–1293)

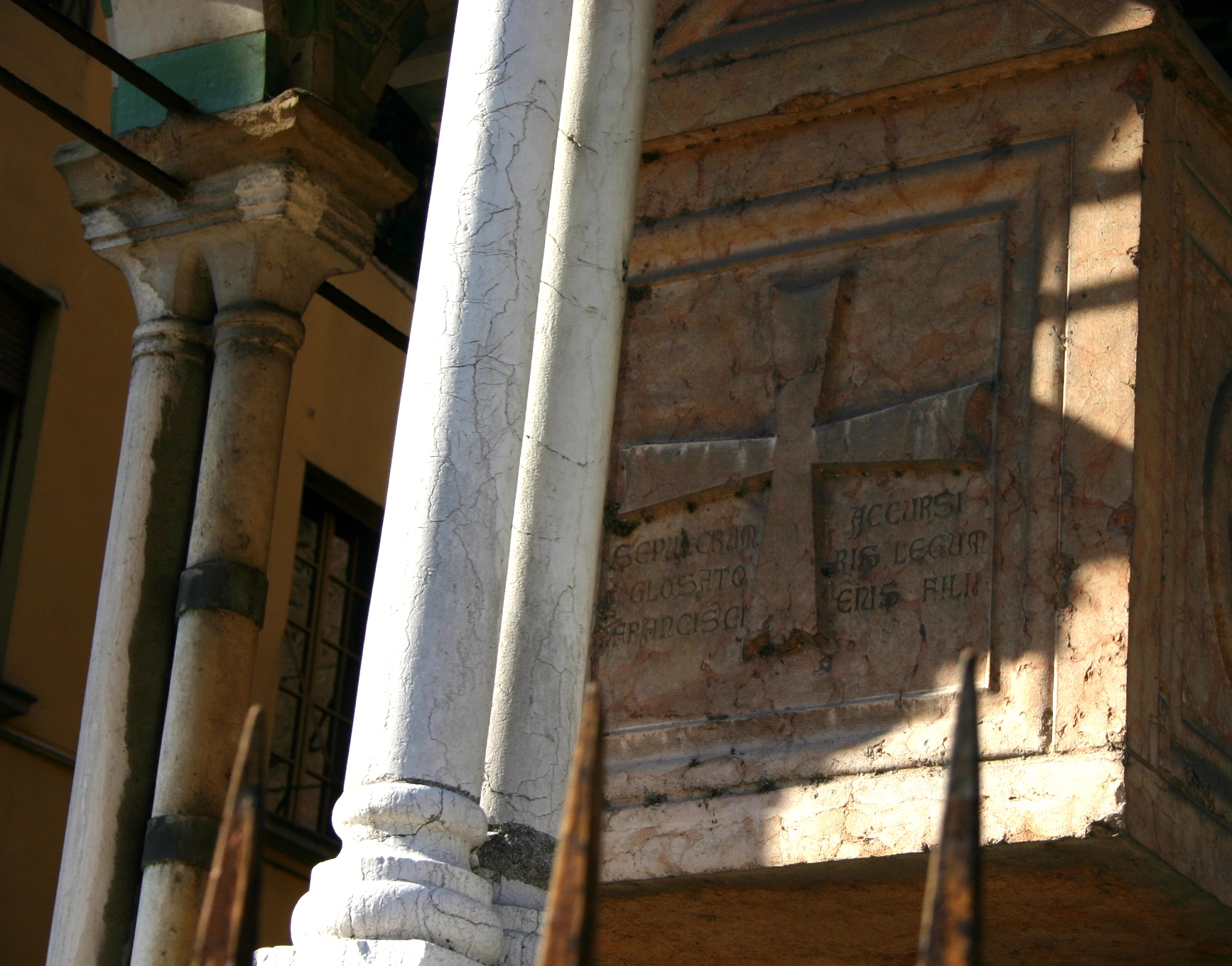
Gravestone for Franciscus Accursius in Bologna, Italy.

Franciscus Accursius (Italian: Francesco d'Accorso) (1225–1293) was an Italian lawyer, the son of the celebrated jurist and glossator Accursius. The two are often confused.

Born in Bologna, Franciscus was more distinguished for his tact than for his wisdom. Edward I of England, returning from Palestine, brought him with him to England. The king invited him to Oxford, and he lived in the former Beaumont Palace, (in today's Beaumont Street), in Oxford.

In 1275 or 1276, he read lectures on law in the university. He acted as King's Secretary in the late 1270s until returning to Bologna in 1282, practicing law there until his death.

Dante (a contemporary) places Franciscus Accursius in Hell among the sodomites (Inferno XV, 110). The tomb of his father and himself in Bologna bears the inscription: "Sepulchrum Accursii, glossatoris legum, et Francisci, ejus filii."

== Biography ==
He studied at the University of Bologna where he had among his fellow students Jacobus de Belviso. He taught civil law at the same university until 1273, then was called to University of Oxford by Edward I of England. A year after his departure, his property in Bologna was confiscated as a Guelphs and Ghibellines. When he returned to his city in 1291, they were nevertheless returned to him.

He had two brothers, Cervottus and Guglielmo, who, like him, studied law with their father. He was buried next to his father in Bologna.

Dante Alighieri placed him among the sodomites in the 15th canto of Inferno (v. 110).
