= John C. Buckner =

American politician

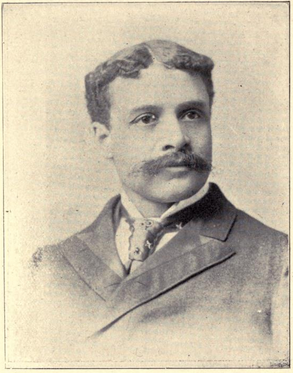

Illinois House of Representatives
- In office 1895–1898

Personal details
- Born: March 14, 1859; Kendall County, Illinois
- Died: December 17, 1913; Chicago
- Political party: Republican

John Clinton Buckner (born March 14, 1859 – December 17, 1913) was a caterer, major in the Illinois National Guard, tax collector and state legislator in Illinois.

He was born in Kendall County, Illinois on his fathers farm. He was educated in the John Dillion Grammar School in Joliet and then two years at the Northwestern University without completing his degree due to ill health. He moved to Chicago in 1876 working first in a brass foundry and then as a caterer.

He was a leader of a protest of the Spring Valley Race Riot of 1895. He served in the Illinois National Guard, organised the Ninth battalion, and became major when he succeeded Major B. G. Johnson when he retired. He was a deputy tax collector for 15 years for the first district of Illinois.

He was elected to serve in the Illinois House of Representatives in 1895-1896, serving the 5th district with Milroy H. Gibson. He was re-elected for the 1897-1898 session and represented the 5th district as a Republican. He had been the only African American in his second session and did not serve another term.

He died December 17, 1913 at his home on Dearborn Street Chicago. He had never been married and was survived by two sisters. 6000 people paid tribute to him at the Seventh Regiment armory.

== Notes ==
- The book Political Empowerment of Illinois' African-American State Lawmakers from 1877 to 2005 has his birth as March 14, 1819 but this appears to be a typo as the book The portraiture of the 39th General Assembly, Illinois, 1895 has March 14, 1859. This second date is more inline with his death in 1913, but obituaries have his age as 55, 65 and 72.
