= University of Perugia =

Italian public university

Coordinates: 43.116°N 12.386°E

- Università degli Studi di Perugia
- Latin: Studium Generale Civitatis Perusii
- Type: Public
- Established: 1308; 718 years ago
- Affiliations: AlmaLaurea, Compostela Group of Universities
- Rector: Prof. Massimiliano Marianelli
- Faculty: 1,088 (2017)
- Administrative staff: 1,200
- Students: 26,732 (2017/18)
- Undergraduates: 12,868
- Postgraduates: 8,670
- Doctoral students: 470 (2015)
- Location: Piazza dell'Università, 1 - 06121 Perugia, Perugia, Italy
- Campus: Both urban and rural
- Sports teams: CUS Perugia
- Colours: Blue and Red
- Website: www.unipg.it/

The University of Perugia (Italian Università degli Studi di Perugia) is a public university in Perugia, Italy. It was founded in 1308, as attested by the Bull issued by Pope Clement V certifying the birth of the Studium Generale.

The official seal of the university depicts Saint Herculan, one of the patron saints, and the rampant crowned griffin, which is the city symbol; they represent the ecclesiastical and civil powers, respectively, which gave rise to the university in the Middle Ages.

== History ==
One of the "free" universities of Italy, it was elevated into a studium generale on September 8, 1308, by the Bull "Super specula" of Clement V. A school of arts existed by about 1200, in which medicine and law were soon taught, with a strong commitment expressed by official documents of the City Council of Perugia. Before 1300 there were several universitates scholiarum. Jacobus de Belviso, a civil jurist, taught here from 1316 to 1321. By Bull on August 1, 1318, John XXII granted the privilege of conferring degrees in civil and canon law, and on February 18, 1321, in medicine and arts.

On May 19, 1355, the emperor Charles IV issued a bull confirming the papal elevation and raising it to the rank of an imperial university. This unusual mark of favour was given to assist Perugia after the terrible plague years of 1348–49. In 1362 the Collegium Gregorianum (later called the Sapienza vecchia) was founded by Cardinal Nicolò Capocci for the maintenance of forty youths. Gregory XI, by Brief of October 11, 1371, gave the privileges of a studium generale to the new faculty of theology. This faculty was suppressed and its property merged into the university in 1811. The Collegio di S. Girolamo was founded by Benedetto Guidalotti, Bishop of Recanatias a free hostel for impecunious strangers who wished to study law and medicine in 1426, with Martin V's approval, and transferred (as the Sapienza nuova) to the university. Suppressed by the French in 1798, it was reopened in 1807 by Pius VII as the Collegio Pio. In the Constitution of August 27, 1824, Leo XII made this the chief college of the university.

With the unification of Italy in 1860 the University of Perugia was established under the jurisdiction of the rector and the Town Council, who issued statutes subject to approval by the government. From 1944 to the present, the University of Perugia has achieved an outstanding reputation as one of the leading universities in Italy.

Since the time of Napoleon I, the university has occupied the old Olivetan convent of Monte Morcino. There was a faculty of mathematics down to 1884. The statutes are modelled upon those of Bologna. The number of students at different dates was 142 in 1339, 79 in 1881, 350 in 1911.

== Organization ==
The University of Perugia has 16 faculties and offers first-cycle, second-cycle and single-cycle degree programmes. It offers its main courses in Perugia and Terni, and additional programs throughout the Umbria region in the cities of Assisi, Foligno, and Narni.

The faculties into which the university is divided are:

- Department of Agricultural, Food and Environmental Science
- Department of Chemistry, Biology and Biotechnology
- Department of Civil and Environmental Engineering
- Department of Economics
- Department of Engineering
- Department of Humanities, Ancient and Modern Languages, Literature and Cultures
- Department of Law
- Department of Mathematics and Computer Science
- Department of Medicine and Surgery
- Department of Pharmaceutical Sciences
- Department of Philosophy, Social Sciences and Education
- Department of Physics and Geology
- Department of Political Science
- Department of Veterinary Medicine

Its research programs are conducted by 14 departments with a total of 1,200 full-time staff.

The university's activities also include 25 service organizations and research centers as well as 11 libraries with rich collections and equipment. It had a total enrolment of over 27,000 students for the 2021–2022 academic year.

== Academic authorities ==
- Rector Prof. Maurizio Oliviero Università degli Studi di Perugia
- Prorector Prof. Fausto Elisei Università degli Studi di Perugia
- Deputy Rectors Università degli Studi di Perugia
  - Prof. Luca Bartocci
  - Prof. Paolo Belardi
  - Prof. Stefano Brancorsini
  - Prof. Gabriele Cruciani
  - Prof. Fausto Elisei
  - Prof.ssa Carla Emiliani
  - Prof. Daniele Parbuono
  - Prof. Daniele Porena
  - Prof. Roberto Rettori
  - Prof.ssa Stefania Stefanelli
  - Prof. Mario Tosti
  - Prof. Helios Vocca

== Eminent faculty and alumni ==
Among its eminent teachers were:

- Luca Pacioli (c. 1447–1517), father of accounting
- Jacobus de Belviso (c. 1270–1335), jurist
- Johannes Andreas, canonist
- Cino da Pistoia, (1270–1336), poet and jurist
- Bartolus de Saxoferrato, (1314–1357), famous civil jurist
- Baldus de Ubaldis (1327–1400), jurist, (its figure is represented on all diploma certificates)
- Gentile da Foligno (d. 1348), physician
- Albericus Gentilis, founder of the science of international law
- Francesco della Rovere Pope (Sixtus IV)
- Annibale Mariotti, physician
- Annibale Vecchi, pharmacist
- Domenico Bruschi, botanist
- Bernardo Dessau, physicist
- Giuseppe Antinori, arcadian and classicist
- Francesco Coppola, politician
- Anita Seppilli, cultural anthropologist

Among its students have been:

- Nicholas IV
- Gregory XI (c. 1329–1378, r. 1370–1378)
- Cesare Borgia (c. 1490-1491)
- Innocent VII
- Martin V
- Pius III
- Julius II
- Julius III
- Urban VII
- Gregory XIV
- Clement VIII
- Paul V
- Ruggero Oddi, physician
- Michaëlle Jean, former governor general of Canada and current secretary-general of La Francophonie
- Monica Bellucci, actress
- Suze Rotolo
- Pier Paolo Pandolfi
- The former UK Conservative Party leader Iain Duncan Smith infamously claimed in his CV to be a graduate of the university but, in fact, spent a short period studying at the University for Foreigners in Perugia, where he did not complete his studies and did not gain any qualifications.

== Points of interest ==
- Orto Botanico dell'Università di Perugia, the university's botanical garden

== In popular culture ==
The 1973 film Torso, a giallo directed by Sergio Martino, retrospectively recognized as one of the first "proto-slasher films", is set at the University of Perugia and surrounding locales.

== See also ==
- List of Italian universities
- List of medieval universities
- Perugia
