= Jacobus de Belviso =

Jacobus de Belviso (c. 1270 – 1335) was an Italian jurist from Bologna. His later reputation was based on the text Practica criminalis on criminal law printed under his name in 1515. This is, however, no longer believed to be his work.

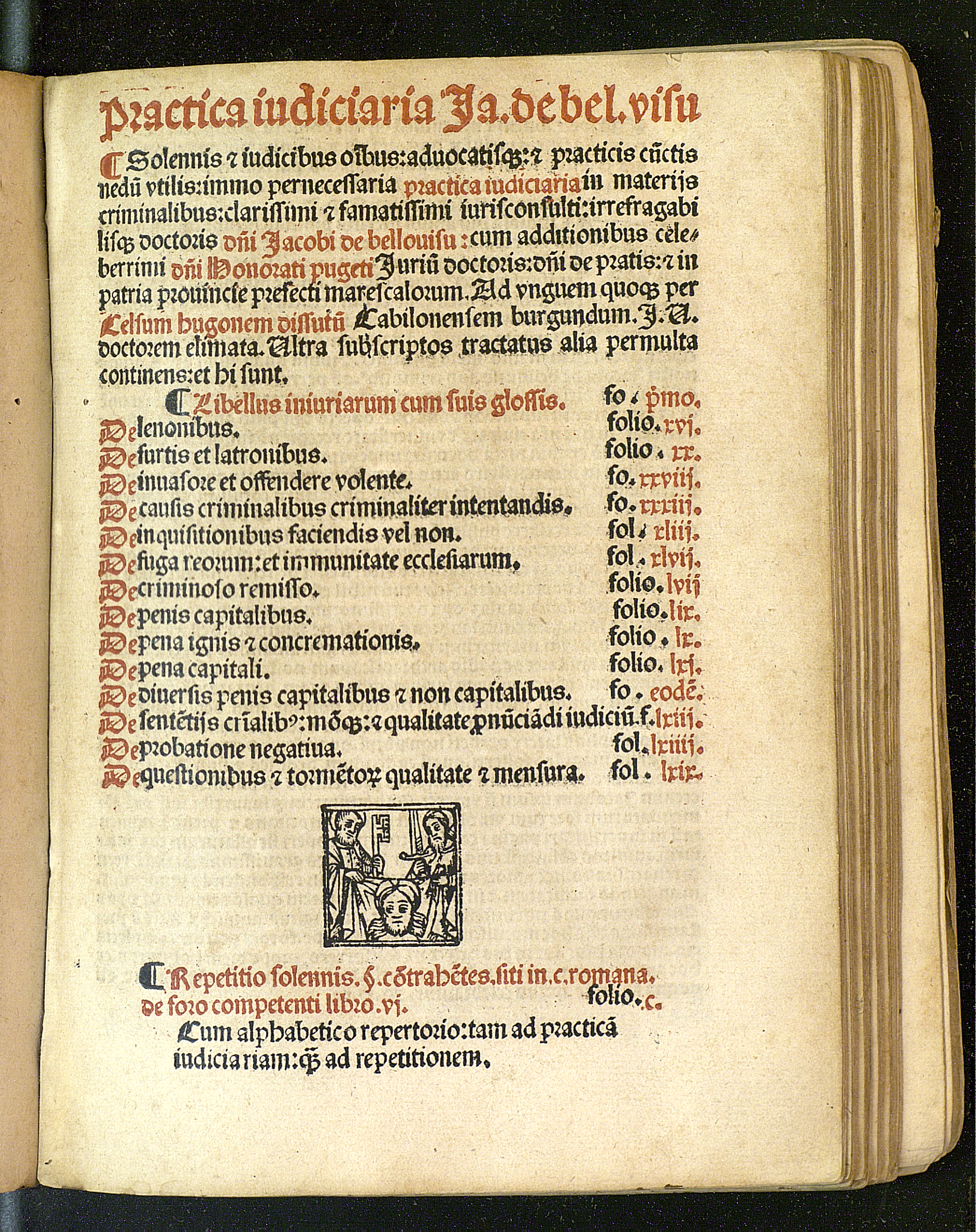
Practica iudiciaria, 1521

== Biography ==
Born about 1270 in Bologna (although the place is not certain), he studied in his native city with Franciscus Accursius and Dinus de Rossonis. He was a professor of Canon law at the University of Bologna, where he began teaching with only a Bachelor's degree. In late 1297 and early 1298, he became politically close to Charles II of Naples, king of Sicily and Naples and count of Provence, a supporter of the Guelphs and Ghibellines. He obtained his doctorate in Aix-en-Provence (where he resided for some time) from the hands of the chancellor of the University of Naples Federico II and in the presence of Charles II, according to what Belvisi himself wrote in the proem of his most important work, Practica criminalis.

Banished from Bologna for political reasons, he taught in Naples (1298 to 1302-1303),University of Padua (1306-1307), University of Siena (around 1307-1308), University of Perugia (1316 to 1324), finally returning to Bologna in 1321 to remain there as a lecturer.He died in his hometown in January 1335.

His fame is linked to the Criminal law treatise Practica criminalis, published in Lyon in 1515, although in the past, some have questioned the authorship of this work.

== Works ==
- Lectura Authenticorum, Lyon 1511.
- Practica criminalis, Lyon 1515.
- Practica iudiciaria (in Latin). Lyon: Jean Remy. 1521.
