= L'Italiano (newspaper) =

Italian daily newspaper published in Argentina

- Type: Daily newspaper
- Format: Tabloid
- Owner: SEI S.A.
- Founder: Gian Luigi Ferretti
- Editor: Salvatore Santangelo
- Managing editor: Tullio Zembo
- News editor: Stefano Pelaggi
- Headquarters: Avda. Córdoba 1237 Piso 5, (1055) C.A. Buenos Aires, Argentina
- Circulation: 20,000 Daily
- ISSN: 1971-7776
- Website: www.litaliano.it

L'Italiano is an Italian daily newspaper published in Argentina.

== History ==
Founded in Rome in 2006, by a group of journalists interested in question related to Italians abroad from a center-right perspective, according to a project devised by Cav. Gian Luigi Ferretti, who was its first director. In 2010 L’Italiano is launched in Argentina using content edited and transmitted from Rome. Right afterwards, L’Italiano transforms itself in a truly Argentinean daily newspaper in Italian language and at the same time abandons its political center-right orientation to become an independent newspaper not only with a strong Italian news section but also with ample space to news from the Argentine-Italian community and Italians abroad.the new director Tullio Zembo from 2016

== Distribution and Contents ==
L'Italiano is published from Tuesday to Saturdays in Argentina, with 12 pages in tabloid format. It is distributed in the metropolitan area of Buenos Aires, where more than 400.000 currently live. L’Italiano can also be read on PC, tablets and smartphones and in 2013 became the first Italian newspaper abroad to have an own app at the iOS App Store.

L'Italiano sponsored the creation of “Italia nel mondo”, a collection of historical and social research about global Italian emigration with the aim of giving ample space to these types of studies. The first publications of these collection are: "L'Altra Italia" by Stefano Pelaggi (historical emigration and juvenile mobility compared) - "Il divario" by Luca Marfé, Emanuele Schibotto (Globalization, Emigration and South). - "Italiani in movimento. Ripensare l’emigrazione italiana in Argentina" di Elena Ambrosetti e Donatella Strangio. - "Il colonialismo popolare, L'emigrazione e la tentazione espansionistica italiana in America latina" di Stefano Pelaggi.

== L'Italiano Awards to Italian Excellence Abroad ==
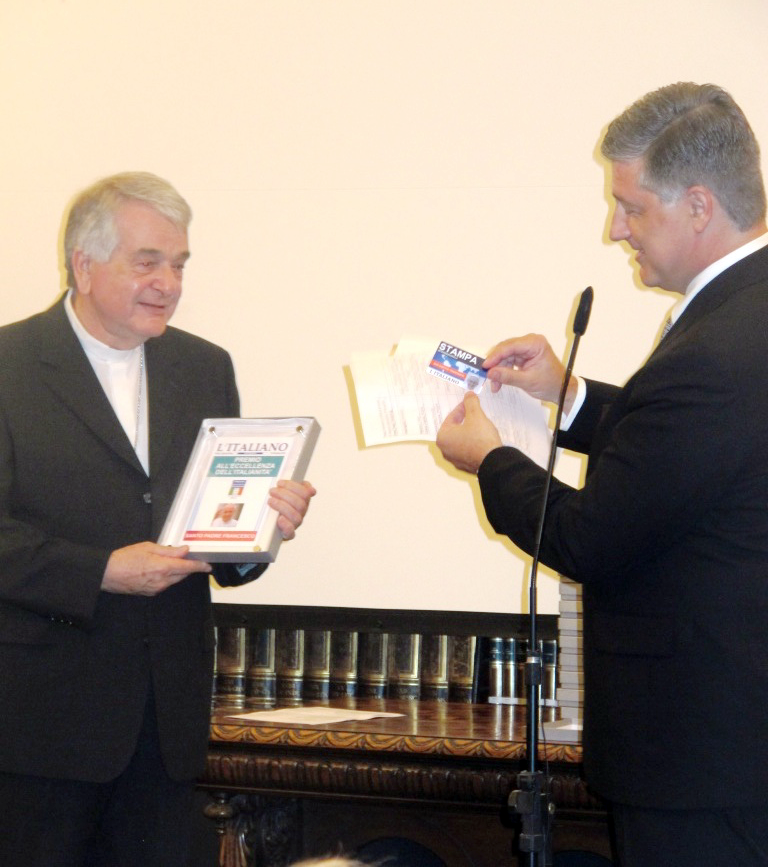
Marcelo Bomrad Casanova, editorial director of L’Italiano giving the prize awarded to Pope Francis to his Ambassador to Argentina Mons. Emil Paul Tscherrig

On December 18, 2013 the first edition of the "L'Italiano Awards to Italian Excellence Abroad" took place at the Italian Institute of Culture in Buenos Aires, Argentina. The prize is awarded to all those Italian descendants with extraordinary achievements on their respective fields. The selection committee for the first edition or the awards was composed by: Gian Luigi Ferretti, founder and global director of the newspaper, Tullio Zembo and Marcelo Bomrad-Casanova, Director and Editorial Director respectively and Arturo Curatola, VP of the Italian Chamber of Commerce of Buenos Aires. The first prize was awarded to Pope Francis, Argentine of piedmonts’ descendant and the prize was received by the Vatican’s Ambassador to Argentina Mons. Emil Paul Tscherrig. Other celebrities awarded were in alphabetical order: Francesca Ambrogetti, author of the book The Jesuit a biography of Pope Francis; Fabio Bartucci, a highly celebrated ophthalmologist in Argentina; Nicolás Catena Zapata, founder and CEO of Catena Zapata one of the most important wineries worldwide; Eduardo Costantini, important businessman and philanthropist; Mariano Cúneo Libarona, the best penal lawyer in Argentina; Carlota D'Adamo, executive with Emirates Airlines Argentina; Ricardo Echegaray, head of AFIP (local IRS); Pedro Ferraina, best gastric surgeon and university professor; Gustavo Marangoni, CEO of the Banco Provincia de Buenos Aires; Oscar Marvasio, president and CEO of Radio Catena Eco, Luigi Pallaro, businessman and president of the Camera di Commercio Italiana; Eduardo Serenellini, famous TV journalist; Cristiano Rattazzi, president and CEO Fiat Argentina; Eduardo Santarelli and Juan Santarelli, CEO and COO of Arcano Pharmaceuticals; Pietro Sorba, celebrated gourmet journalist and writer; Marcelo Tinelli, TV showman and VP of soccer team San Lorenzo. BairesUno a local signal related to RAI has transmitted the entire ceremony.
