= Aaron the Bookseller =

Aaron the Bookseller was an Italian dealer in Hebrew and other ancient manuscripts, who flourished at the beginning of the fourteenth century. He spent seven years in Toledo, searching successfully for Arabic and Hebrew books, and was able to circulate among the young students of the city of Perugia a catalog of eighty Hebrew and Arabic manuscripts. Immanuel de Romi and his friends, on one occasion, took advantage of Aaron's absence from home, broke open his book-cases, and hastily copied some manuscripts. De Romi then added insult to injury by writing, in the form of a letter, a bitter satire on Aaron.
